= 1979 Kansas City Royals season =

1979 Kansas City Royals
- League: American League
- Division: West
- Ballpark: Royals Stadium
- City: Kansas City, Missouri
- Record: 85–77 (.525)
- Divisional place: 2nd
- Owners: Ewing Kauffman
- General managers: Joe Burke
- Managers: Whitey Herzog (fourth full season)
- Television: KBMA (Steve Shannon, Dave Nelson)
- Radio: WIBW (AM) (Denny Matthews, Fred White)

The 1979 Kansas City Royals season was their 11th season in Major League Baseball. The Royals finished second in the American League West at 85–77, three games behind the California Angels and ending Kansas City's run of three consecutive division titles. Darrell Porter tied a single-season franchise record with 112 runs batted in. George Brett led the American League in hits (212) and triples (20). Manager Whitey Herzog was fired following the season.

== Offseason ==
- January 9, 1979: Mike Bielecki was drafted by the Royals in the 6th round of the 1979 Major League Baseball draft, but did not sign.
- February 26, 1979: Eduardo Rodríguez was purchased by the Royals from the Milwaukee Brewers.

== Regular season ==
=== Season standings ===
AL West
Team	W	L	Pct.	GB	Home	Road
California Angels	88	74	.543	—	49‍–‍32	39‍–‍42
Kansas City Royals	85	77	.525	3	46‍–‍35	39‍–‍42
Texas Rangers	83	79	.512	5	44‍–‍37	39‍–‍42
Minnesota Twins	82	80	.506	6	39‍–‍42	43‍–‍38
Chicago White Sox	73	87	.456	14	33‍–‍46	40‍–‍41
Seattle Mariners	67	95	.414	21	36‍–‍45	31‍–‍50
Oakland Athletics	54	108	.333	34	31‍–‍50	23‍–‍58

=== Record vs. opponents ===
1979 American League record Sources:
Team	BAL	BOS	CAL	CWS	CLE	DET	KC	MIL	MIN	NYY	OAK	SEA	TEX	TOR
Baltimore	—	8–5	9–3	8–3	8–5	7–6	6–6	8–5	8–4	5–6	8–4	10–2	6–6	11–2
Boston	5–8	—	5–7	5–6	6–7	8–5	8–4	8–4	9–3	5–8	9–3	8–4	6–6	9–4
California	3–9	7–5	—	9–4	6–6	4–8	7–6	7–5	9–4	7–5	10–3	7–6	5–8	7–5
Chicago	3–8	6–5	4–9	—	6–6	3–9	5–8	5–7	5–8	4–8	9–4	5–8	11–2	7–5
Cleveland	5–8	7–6	6–6	6–6	—	6–6	6–6	4–9	8–4	5–8	8–4	7–5	5–7	8–5
Detroit	6–7	5–8	8–4	9–3	6–6	—	5–7	6–7	4–8	7–6	7–5	7–5	6–6	9–4
Kansas City	6–6	4–8	6–7	8–5	6–6	7–5	—	5–7	7–6	5–7	9–4	7–6	6–7	9–3
Milwaukee	5–8	4–8	5–7	7–5	9–4	7–6	7–5	—	8–4	9–4	6–6	9–3	9–3	10–3
Minnesota	4–8	3–9	4–9	8–5	4–8	8–4	6–7	4–8	—	7–5	9–4	10–3	4–9	11–1
New York	6–5	8–5	5–7	8–4	8–5	6–7	7–5	4–9	5–7	—	9–3	6–6	8–4	9–4
Oakland	4–8	3–9	3–10	4–9	4–8	5–7	4–9	6–6	4–9	3–9	—	8–5	2–11	4–8
Seattle	2–10	4–8	6–7	8–5	5–7	5–7	6–7	3–9	3–10	6–6	5–8	—	6–7	8–4
Texas	6–6	6–6	8–5	2–11	7–5	6–6	7–6	3–9	9–4	4–8	11–2	7–6	—	7–5
Toronto	2–11	4–9	5–7	5–7	5–8	4–9	3–9	3–10	1–11	4–9	8–4	4–8	5–7	—

=== Notable transactions ===
- April 3, 1979: Doug Bird was traded by the Royals to the Philadelphia Phillies for Todd Cruz.
- April 27, 1979: George Throop was traded by the Royals to the Houston Astros for a player to be named later. The Astros completed the deal by sending Keith Drumright to the Royals on October 26.
- June 5, 1979: 1979 Major League Baseball draft
  - Atlee Hammaker was drafted by the Royals in the 1st round (21st pick).
  - Dan Marino was drafted by the Royals in the 4th round (99th pick overall).
  - John Elway was drafted by the Royals in the 18th round (463rd pick overall).

=== Roster ===
1979 Kansas City Royals
Roster
Pitchers: 40 Steve Busby; 25 Craig Chamberlain; 31 Gary Christenson; 35 Craig Eaton; 38 Rich Gale; 32 Larry Gura; 39 Al Hrabosky; 22 Dennis Leonard; 27 Renie Martin; 23 Steve Mingori; 42 Bill Paschall; 33 Marty Pattin; 29 Dan Quisenberry; 21 Eduardo Rodríguez; 34 Paul Splittorff; 35 George Throop	Catchers: 13 Jim Gaudet; 15 Darrell Porter; 9,10 Jamie Quirk; Infielders: 43 Germán Barranca; 5 George Brett; 7 Todd Cruz; 8 Pete LaCock; 2 Freddie Patek; 0 George Scott; 1 Jerry Terrell; 30 U L Washington; 12 John Wathan; 20 Frank White	Outfielders: 3 Steve Braun; 18 Al Cowens; 9,10 Clint Hurdle; 28 Jim Nettles; 26 Amos Otis; 25 Tom Poquette; 6 Willie Wilson; 19 Joe Zdeb; Other batters: 11 Hal McRae	Manager: 24 Whitey Herzog; Coaches: 14 Steve Boros; 36 Galen Cisco; 4 Chuck Hiller; 16 John Sullivan

== Player stats ==
= Indicates team leader

= Indicates league leader

=== Batting ===
==== Starters by position ====
Note: Pos = Position; G = Games played; AB = At bats; H = Hits; Avg. = Batting average; HR = Home runs; RBI = Runs batted in; SB = Stolen bases

Pos	Player	G	AB	H	Avg.	HR	RBI	SB
C	Darrell Porter	157	533	155	.291	20	112	3
1B	Pete LaCock	132	408	113	.277	3	56	2
2B	Frank White	127	467	124	.266	10	48	28
3B	George Brett	154	645	212	.329	23	107	17
SS	Freddie Patek	106	306	77	.252	1	37	11
LF	Willie Wilson	154	588	185	.315	6	49	83
CF	Al Cowens	136	516	152	.295	9	73	10
RF	Hal McRae	101	393	113	.288	10	74	5

==== Other batters ====
Note: G = Games played; AB = At bats; H = Hits; Avg. = Batting average; HR = Home runs; RBI = Runs batted in

Player	G	AB	H	Avg.	HR	RBI
U L Washington	101	268	68	.254	2	25
John Wathan	90	199	41	.206	2	28
Clint Hurdle	59	171	41	.240	3	30
George Scott	44	146	39	.267	1	20
Todd Cruz	55	118	24	.203	2	15
Steve Braun	58	116	31	.267	4	10
Jamie Quirk	51	79	24	.304	1	11
Jerry Terrell	31	40	12	.300	1	2
Tom Poquette	21	26	5	.192	0	3
Jim Nettles	11	23	2	.087	0	1
Joe Zdeb	15	23	4	.174	0	0
Jim Gaudet	3	6	1	.167	0	0
Germán Barranca	5	5	3	.600	0	0

=== Pitching ===
==== Starting pitchers ====
Note: G = Games pitched; IP = Innings pitched; W = Wins; L = Losses; ERA = Earned run average; SO = Strikeouts

Player	G	IP	W	L	ERA	SO
Paul Splittorff	36	240.0	15	17	4.24	77
Dennis Leonard	32	236.0	14	12	4.08	126
Larry Gura	39	233.2	13	12	4.47	85
Rich Gale	34	181.2	9	10	5.65	103
Craig Chamberlain	10	69.2	4	4	3.75	30

==== Other pitchers ====
Note: G = Games pitched; IP = Innings pitched; W = Wins; L = Losses; ERA = Earned run average; SO = Strikeouts

Player	G	IP	W	L	ERA	SO
Steve Busby	22	94.1	6	6	3.63	45
Marty Pattin	31	94.1	5	2	4.58	41

==== Relief pitchers ====
Note: G = Games pitched; W = Wins; L = Losses; SV = Saves; ERA = Earned run average; SO = Strikeouts

Player	G	W	L	SV	ERA	SO
Al Hrabosky	58	9	4	11	3.74	39
Dan Quisenberry	32	3	2	5	3.15	13
Steve Mingori	30	3	3	1	5.79	18
Eduardo Rodríguez	29	4	1	2	4.84	26
Renie Martin	25	0	3	5	5.19	25
Bill Paschall	7	0	1	0	6.59	3
Gary Christenson	6	0	0	0	3.38	4
Craig Eaton	5	0	0	0	2.70	4
George Throop	4	0	0	0	13.50	1
Jerry Terrell	1	0	0	0	0.00	0

== Awards and honors ==
All-Star Game

- Darrell Porter, Catcher, Starter
- Frank White, Second Base, Starter
- George Brett, Third Base, Starter

== Farm system ==
Level	Team	League	Manager
AAA	Omaha Royals	American Association	Gordon Mackenzie
AA	Jacksonville Suns	Southern League	Joe Jones
A	Fort Myers Royals	Florida State League	Gene Lamont
Rookie	GCL Royals Blue	Gulf Coast League	Brian Murphy
Rookie	GCL Royals Gold	Gulf Coast League	José Martínez
