= 1980 American League Championship Series =

12th edition of Major League Baseball's American League Championship Series

Team (Wins)	Managers	Season
Kansas City Royals (3)	Jim Frey	97–65, .599, GA: 14
New York Yankees (0)	Dick Howser	103–59, .636, GA: 3
- Dates: October 8–10
- MVP: Frank White (Kansas City)
- Umpires: Steve Palermo; Joe Brinkman; Larry McCoy; Bill Haller (crew chief); Ken Kaiser; George Maloney

Broadcast
- Television: ABC; WDAF-TV (KC); WPIX (NYY)
- TV announcers: ABC: Al Michaels, Billy Martin and Jim Palmer; WDAF-TV: Al Wisk and Denny Trease; WPIX: Phil Rizzuto, Frank Messer and Bill White
- Radio: CBS; WIBW (KC); WINS (NYY)
- Radio announcers: CBS: Ernie Harwell and Curt Gowdy; WIBW: Denny Matthews and Fred White; WINS: Phil Rizzuto, Frank Messer, Bill White and Fran Healy

The 1980 American League Championship Series was a best-of-five playoff in Major League Baseball's 1980 postseason that featured the American League West champion Kansas City Royals against the American League East champion New York Yankees. This was the fourth matchup between the two teams in the past five seasons, and Kansas City got a measure of revenge by beating the Yankees in three straight to advance to their first ever World Series.

As of 2026, this is the only time the Royals defeated the Yankees in the postseason.

== Background ==
In 1980, three of the four division races came down to the last week of the season. In the American League East, the Yankees (103-59) outlasted the Baltimore Orioles (100-62) to earn a trip back to the postseason after missing out in 1979. The only division to not come down to the last weekend of the season was the American League West, who the Kansas City Royals won by 14 games over the Oakland Athletics.

This set the stage for the fourth Royals versus Yankees American League Championship Series in five seasons. While the Yankees had won each of the previous three meetings, each postseason series between the two clubs was an instant-classic, with the 1976 and 1977 ALCS' coming down to a winner-take-all (Chris Chambliss hit a walk-off home run in 1976 and the Yankees scored three runs in the ninth against closer Mark Littell to win in Kansas City in 1977). In the 1978 match-up, the Royals failed to get a Amos Otis leadoff double home in the ninth inning to tie the score and potentially force another winner-take-all Game 5, as well.

== Summary ==
=== New York Yankees vs. Kansas City Royals ===
Kansas City won the series, 3–0.

Game	Date	Score	Location	Time	Attendance
1	October 8	New York Yankees – 2, Kansas City Royals – 7	Royals Stadium	3:00	42,598
2	October 9	New York Yankees – 2, Kansas City Royals – 3	Royals Stadium	2:51	42,633
3	October 10	Kansas City Royals – 4, New York Yankees – 2	Yankee Stadium	2:59	56,588

== Game summaries ==
=== Game 1 ===
October 8, 1980 2:00 pm (CT) at Royals Stadium in Kansas City, Missouri 87 °F (31 °C) sunny
Team	1	2	3	4	5	6	7	8	9	R	H	E
New York	0	2	0	0	0	0	0	0	0	2	10	1
Kansas City	0	2	2	0	0	0	1	2	X	7	10	0
WP: Larry Gura (1–0) LP: Ron Guidry (0–1); Home runs: NYY: Rick Cerone (1), Lou Piniella (1); KC: George Brett (1)

The series opener saw the Yankees throw their ace, Ron Guidry, against the Royals' Larry Gura. In the top of the second, the Bronx Bombers jumped out to a 2–0 lead when Rick Cerone and Lou Piniella smacked back-to-back home runs. However, in the bottom of the inning, the Royals struck back. Amos Otis singled to center and stole second, and John Wathan walked. A wild pitch moved Otis to third and Wathan to second, and Frank White doubled both men home to tie the game.

The Royals moved ahead in the third, when George Brett walked and moved to third on a ground-rule double by Otis. A single by Willie Aikens plated both Brett and Otis, chasing Guidry from the game. Brett added a home run off Ron Davis in the seventh, and a Willie Wilson double off Tom Underwood in the eighth scored Darrell Porter and White to give Kansas City a 7–2 lead. The Yankees, meanwhile, could not score against Gura after the back-to-back home runs of the second inning, and the Royals' hurler went the distance as his team drew first blood in the series with a 7–2 victory.

=== Game 2 ===
October 9, 1980 7:15 pm (CT) at Royals Stadium in Kansas City, Missouri 75 °F (24 °C) clear
Team	1	2	3	4	5	6	7	8	9	R	H	E
New York	0	0	0	0	2	0	0	0	0	2	8	0
Kansas City	0	0	3	0	0	0	0	0	X	3	6	0
WP: Dennis Leonard (1–0) LP: Rudy May (0–1) Sv: Dan Quisenberry (1); Home runs: NYY: Graig Nettles (1); KC: None

Game 2 proved to be much more exciting after the Royals blowout of Game 1. For this contest, the Yankees sent Rudy May to the hill to face the Royals' Dennis Leonard.

Kansas City opened the scoring in the bottom of the third, as Darrell Porter and Frank White reached base with consecutive singles. Willie Wilson followed with a triple to right to bring both runners in, and then scored himself on a double to center field by shortstop U L Washington. The Yankees came back with two in the fifth, with Graig Nettles hitting an inside-the-park home run and Willie Randolph lashing a double to right to score Bobby Brown.

The eighth inning, however, proved to be the most memorable inning of the game, with the Royals clinging to their 3–2 lead and the Yankees threatening. Willie Randolph singled, and with two outs Bob Watson ripped a liner to deep left field. Confident in Randolph's speed, Yankee third base coach Mike Ferraro decided to wave Randolph home. Left fielder Willie Wilson overthrew his cutoff man, Washington, but third baseman George Brett made a heads-up play by backing up Washington. He then whirled and threw Randolph out at the plate. Television cameras panned the stands where Yankees owner George Steinbrenner and general manager Gene Michael were sitting. A furious Steinbrenner appeared to shout Ferraro's name as he turned to Michael. The Royals ended up winning that game by a 3–2 margin and Steinbrenner continued to fume over the play.

=== Game 3 ===
October 10, 1980 8:15 pm (ET) at Yankee Stadium in Bronx, New York 55 °F (13 °C) overcast
Team	1	2	3	4	5	6	7	8	9	R	H	E
Kansas City	0	0	0	0	1	0	3	0	0	4	12	1
New York	0	0	0	0	0	2	0	0	0	2	8	0
WP: Dan Quisenberry (1–0) LP: Goose Gossage (0–1); Home runs: KC: Frank White (1), George Brett (2); NYY: None

With a 2–0 series lead, the Royals headed to Yankee Stadium for Game 3. The Royals led 1-0 on Frank White's fifth-inning homer until the bottom of the sixth inning when Oscar Gamble hit a ground ball up the middle with Reggie Jackson on second. Eventual ALCS MVP Frank White ranged far to his right to field the ball, and knowing he could not throw out Gamble at first, attempted an off balance throw to third to hopefully catch Jackson rounding the bag. However, the throw by White, a multiple Gold Glove winner, was too high and Royals third baseman George Brett could not catch it. Jackson scored on the play and Gamble was given third base after the ball rolled into the dugout. Gamble later scored on a single by Rick Cerone and the Yankees gained a 2–1 advantage.

Holding on to a 2–1 lead in the seventh inning, pitcher Tommy John gave up a two-out double to Willie Wilson. Yankee manager Dick Howser brought in hard-throwing Goose Gossage, who gave up a single to U L Washington, bringing up George Brett. Brett had wowed the majors during the year, flirting with a .400 batting average, holding an average above .400 as late as September 19 before finishing the year at .390. Brett blasted a Gossage fastball into the upper deck, a three-run home run which stunned the Yankee Stadium crowd. The Royals had a 4–2 lead with All-Star reliever Dan Quisenberry on the mound.

The Yankees mounted a major threat in the eighth, loading the bases with no one out. Quisenberry then got Rick Cerone to line into a double play and the next batter to ground out to close out the inning. The ninth went one-two-three as the Royals and the long-suffering Kansas City baseball fans finally won the American League Pennant, getting revenge on the team that had eliminated them for three straight years.

== Composite box ==
1980 ALCS (3–0): Kansas City Royals over New York Yankees

Team	1	2	3	4	5	6	7	8	9	R	H	E
Kansas City Royals	0	2	5	0	1	0	4	2	0	14	28	1
New York Yankees	0	2	0	0	2	2	0	0	0	6	26	1
Total attendance: 141,819 Average attendance: 47,273

== Aftermath ==
Dick Howser was fired shortly after the conclusion of the 1980 ALCS. Ironically, Howser would go on to win the 1985 World Series as manager of Kansas City. After losing the 1981 World Series to the Los Angeles Dodgers (whom they had beaten in consecutive World Series in 1977 and 1978 after besting the Royals for the American League crown), the Yankees would not again appear in the Fall Classic until winning in 1996 under veteran manager Joe Torre—in a coincidental twist, their best subsequent opportunity prior to 1996 was also during a strike-shortened season: when the 1994 season prematurely ended, the Yankees had the best record in the American League, which was also the second best in baseball.

This would also be the last time the Yankees would be swept in a postseason series for 32 years.

Four men involved with the 1980 ALCS—Yankees manager Dick Howser, outfielder Bobby Murcer, and catcher Johnny Oates; and Royals pitcher Dan Quisenberry—subsequently died of brain cancer. (Tug McGraw and John Vukovich of the Philadelphia Phillies, who defeated the Royals in that year's World Series, also succumbed to the disease, as did Ken Brett, who pitched for Kansas City in the 1980–81 regular seasons.)

While the postseason rivalry died down after 1980 between the two teams, the controversial Pine Tar Game in 1983 continued the rivalry in the regular season.

After this meeting, the fourth in 5 years, the Yankees and Royals would not meet again in the postseason until the 2024 ALDS, a span of 44 years between playoff matchups. New York won the series in four games.
