= Pine Tar Incident =

1983 baseball dispute about a tarred bat

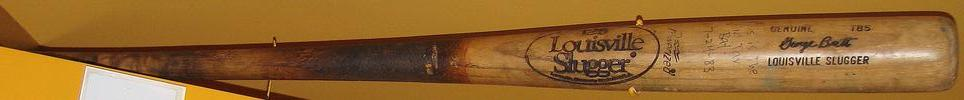
- The baseball bat used by Kansas City Royals third baseman George Brett in the Pine Tar Incident on July 24, 1983
	1	2	3	4	5	6	7	8	9	R	H	E
Kansas City Royals	0	1	0	1	0	1	0	0	2	5	13	0
New York Yankees	0	1	0	0	0	3	0	0	0	4	8	0
- Date: July 24 – August 18, 1983
- Venue: Yankee Stadium
- City: Bronx, New York
- Umpires: HP: Tim McClelland; 1B: Drew Coble; 2B: Joe Brinkman; 3B: Nick Bremigan
- Attendance: 33,944
- Television: WDAF-TV (Royals' broadcast); WPIX (Yankees’ broadcast)
- TV announcers: WDAF-TV: Denny Matthews, Fred White and Denny Trease; WPIX: Phil Rizzuto, Frank Messer, Bill White and Bobby Murcer
- Radio: WIBW (Royals' broadcast); WABC (Yankees’ broadcast)
- Radio announcers: WIBW: Matthews and White; WABC: Rizzuto, Messer, White, and John Gordon

The Pine Tar Incident (also known as the Pine Tar Game) was a controversial incident in 1983 during an American League baseball game played between the Kansas City Royals and New York Yankees at Yankee Stadium in New York City on Sunday, July 24, 1983.

With his team trailing 4–3 in the top half of the ninth inning and two out, the Royals' future Hall of Fame third baseman George Brett hit a two-run home run off future Hall of Fame Yankee closer Rich "Goose" Gossage to give his team the lead; however, Yankee manager Billy Martin, who had noticed a large amount of pine tar on Brett's bat, requested that the umpires inspect his bat. The umpires ruled that the amount on the bat exceeded that allowed by rule, nullified Brett's home run, and called him out. As Brett was the third out in the ninth inning with the home team in the lead, the game ended with a Yankees win.

The Royals protested the game, upheld by American League president Lee MacPhail, who ordered that the game be continued from the point of Brett's home run. The game was resumed 25 days later on August 18 and officially ended with the Royals winning 5–4.

== Overview ==
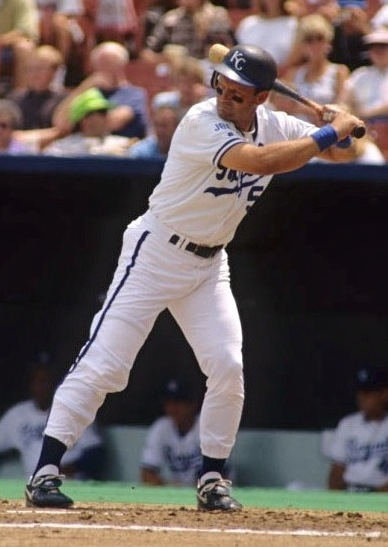
George Brett hit the home run that ultimately won the game for the Kansas City Royals

The visiting Royals were trailing 3–4 with two outs in the top of the ninth in a game being played at New York's Yankee Stadium. With U L Washington on first base George Brett came to the plate and reliever Dale Murray was replaced by closer Rich "Goose" Gossage. After fouling off the first pitch to the left, Brett connected on a high strike and put it well into the right field stands for a two-run home run, giving the Royals a 5–4 lead.

As Brett crossed the plate, Yankees manager Billy Martin approached rookie home plate umpire Tim McClelland and requested Brett's bat to be examined. Before the game, Martin and other members of the Yankees had noticed the excessive pine tar used by Brett, but Martin had chosen not to say anything until it was strategically right to do so. Yankees third baseman and captain Graig Nettles recalled a similar incident involving Thurman Munson in a 1975 game against the Minnesota Twins. In Nettles' autobiography Balls, Nettles claims that he actually informed Martin of the pine tar rule, as Nettles had previously undergone the same scrutiny with his own bat while with the Twins.

With Brett watching from the dugout, McClelland and the rest of the umpiring crew, Drew Coble, Joe Brinkman, and Nick Bremigan, examined the bat. Measuring the extent of the pine tar against the 17 inches or 43 centimetres width of home plate, they determined that the amount, which covered about 24 inches of the bat, exceeded that allowed by Rule 1.10(c) of the Major League Baseball rule book, which read that "a bat may not be covered by such a substance more than 18 inches [46 cm] from the tip of the handle." Because of this, the crew determined that Brett's home run constituted an "illegally batted ball", and under the terms of the then-existing provisions of Rule 6.06, any batter who hit an illegally batted ball was automatically called out. The umpires concluded that Brett's home run was disallowed under this interpretation, and he was out, thus ending the game.

McClelland searched for Brett in the visitors' dugout, pointed at him with the bat, and signaled that he was out, handing the Yankees a 4–3 win. An enraged Brett stormed from the dugout and confronted McClelland before being physically restrained by his manager Dick Howser, several of his teammates, and crew chief Joe Brinkman. Despite the furious protests of Brett and Howser, McClelland's ruling stood.

He's out! Brett is out! Look at this!...He is out, and having to be forcibly restrained from hitting plate umpire Tim McClelland. And the Yankees have won the ball game 4 to 3! Brett is called out for using an...illegal substance on the bat!

— Sportscaster Frank Messer on WPIX.

== Protest and reversal ==
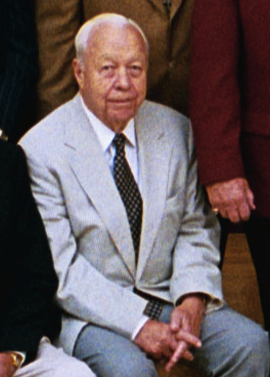
American League president Lee MacPhail ruled that Brett's home run counted

The Royals protested the game. Four days later, American League president Lee MacPhail upheld the Royals' protest. In explaining his decision, MacPhail noted that the "spirit of the restriction" on pine tar on bats was based not on the fear of unfair advantage, but simple economics; any contact with pine tar would discolor the ball, render it unsuitable for play, and require that it be discarded and replaced—thus increasing the home team's cost of supplying balls for a given game. MacPhail ruled that Brett had not violated the spirit of the rules nor deliberately "altered [the bat] to improve the distance factor".

MacPhail's ruling followed his own precedent established after a protest in 1975 of the September 7 game played between the Royals and the California Angels. In that game, the umpiring crew had declined to negate one of John Mayberry's home runs for excessive pine tar use. MacPhail upheld the umpires' decision with the interpretation that the intent of the rule was to prevent baseballs from being discolored during game play and that any discoloration that may have occurred to a ball leaving the ballpark did not affect the game's competitive balance.

MacPhail thus restored Brett's home run and ordered the game resumed with two outs in the top of the ninth inning with the Royals leading 5–4. However, he retroactively ejected Brett for his outburst against McClelland, Howser and Royals coach Rocky Colavito for arguing with the umpires, and Royals pitcher Gaylord Perry for giving the bat to the bat boy so he could hide it in the clubhouse away from officials.

== Conclusion ==
=== Strategic maneuvering ===
After ordering the resumption of play, MacPhail and other league officials held a strategy session to anticipate tricks the Yankees might use to prevent the game from continuing, which included the possibility the Yankees might claim Brett or Washington missed a base, automatically ruling them out, and, depending on which, preventing one or both runs from scoring.

Indeed, the Yankees resisted the resumption of the game, and they hoped to forestall doing so until near the end of the season to see if the game would have an effect on the standings or should be forfeited. Instead, the game was scheduled for 25 days after its suspension, to be resumed on August 18, 1983.

=== Legal battle ===
For the resumption of the game, the Yankees announced that they would charge non-season-ticket holders a $2.50 admission fee to attend. Two lawsuits were filed against the Yankees in Bronx Supreme Court (trial court). Justice Orest Maresca issued an injunction, also requested by the Yankees, preventing the game from being resumed until the lawsuits were litigated. Maresca also cited the Yankees' expressed concerns about security problems resulting from confusion over admission to the game.

That injunction was immediately appealed by the American League and was overturned by Supreme Court Appellate Division Justice Joseph Sullivan, who issued the extremely short and simple decision of "Play ball." The Royals, who were in flight during that day's legal battles, did not know whether the game would be played until they arrived at Newark Airport.

The Yankees finally agreed to allow admission for the game's conclusion to anybody with a ticket stub from the July 24 game at no additional charge.

=== Resumption of play ===
August 18 had been a scheduled off-day for both teams. The ejected Brett did not accompany the team from the airport in New Jersey. Instead, he was to depart directly for Baltimore, where the Royals were scheduled to play the next day, although other sources indicate Brett waited for the rest of the team, passing the time playing hearts. In a 2024 interview, Brett stated he went to an Italian restaurant near the airport while the game was concluded.

The game was resumed from the point of Brett's home run, with about 1,200 fans in attendance. A still-furious Martin made what some initially construed as a mere symbolic protest of continuing the game by putting ace starter Ron Guidry in center field (his second big-league appearance there; he had played an inning in center in 1979) and first baseman Don Mattingly at second base. Mattingly replaced the second baseman from the July 24 game, Bert Campaneris, who was injured, and Guidry replaced original center fielder Jerry Mumphrey, who had been traded on August 10 to the Houston Astros. With Mattingly set to lead off the bottom of the ninth, the move allowed the substitution of another potent batter (Ken Griffey) to play first base, and made the Yankees' top starter available to pitch if needed, all while avoiding "wast[ing] a possible pinch hitter or runner".

Mattingly became a rare Major League left-handed second baseman; no left-hander had played second base or shortstop in a big-league game since Cleveland Indians left-handed pitcher Sam McDowell was switched from pitcher to second base for one batter in a game in 1970 against the Washington Senators in order to avoid facing right-handed Senators slugger Frank Howard.

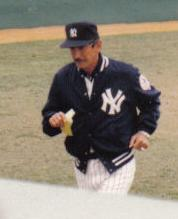
Yankees manager Billy Martin unsuccessfully argued that the Royals baserunners had not touched each base

Before the first pitch to Hal McRae (who followed Brett in the lineup), Yankee pitcher George Frazier threw the first ball to first base to challenge Brett's home run on the grounds that Brett had not touched first base. Umpire Tim Welke (given incorrectly in some sources as Tim McClelland, the original home plate umpire) called safe, even though he had not officiated the July 24 game and seen Brett touch the bases. Frazier then threw to second, claiming that the base was touched by neither Brett nor U L Washington, the other player scoring on the home run, but umpire Dave Phillips, chief of the new crew, signaled safe.

Martin went on the field to argue, and, anticipating just such a gambit, Phillips pulled out a notarized statement produced by MacPhail's administrative assistant Bob Fishel and signed by all four umpires from July 24 indicating that Brett had touched every base. Martin claimed to be surprised by the statement because he had spoken by telephone to the first base umpire from July 24, Drew Coble, who had said that he was not looking at first base when Brett had circled first base. Martin then lodged a protest, announced by the umpires, that the game's outcome was being challenged by the Yankees.

Frazier struck out Hal McRae to end the top of the ninth, 25 days after the inning had begun. Royals' closer Dan Quisenberry retired New York in order—Mattingly flying to center, Roy Smalley flying to left, and Oscar Gamble (pinch hitting for Ron Guidry) grounding to second-for the save preserving the Royals' 5–4 win.

The loss placed the Yankees in fifth place, three and a half games out of first. Neither team advanced to the postseason.

Quisenberry gained his league-leading 33rd save, while Mattingly lost a 25-game hitting streak.

== Aftermath ==
The bat is currently on display in the Baseball Hall of Fame, where it has been since 1987. During a broadcast of Mike & Mike in the Morning, ESPN analyst Tim Kurkjian stated that Brett used the bat for a few games after the incident until being cautioned that the bat would be worthless if broken. Brett sold the bat to famed collector and then-partial owner of the Yankees, Barry Halper, for $25,000 (equivalent to $81,000 in 2025), had second thoughts, repurchased the bat for the same amount, and then donated it to the Hall of Fame.

The home-run ball was caught by journalist Ephraim Schwartz, who sold it and his game ticket stub to Halper for $500 (equivalent to $1,600 in 2025) plus 12 Yankees tickets. Halper also acquired the signed business card of Justice Orest V. Maresca, who had issued the injunction, and the can of Oriole Pine Tar Brett had used on the bat. Gossage later signed the pine-tar ball, "Barry, I threw the fucking thing". The winning pitcher for the Royals was reliever Mike Armstrong. Armstrong said in a 2006 interview that, as the Royals were leaving for the airport after the resumed game, an angry Yankees fan threw a brick from an overpass at Kansas City's bus, cracking its windshield.

"It was wild to go back to New York and play these four outs in a totally empty stadium," Armstrong said in 2006. "I'm dressed in the uniform, and nobody's there."

Before a game against the Yankees at Kauffman Stadium on May 5, 2012, the Royals gave each fan who attended the game a replica baseball bat designed to look like the one Brett used with the pine tar.

As part of the Royals' fiftieth season in 2018, before a game against the Yankees at Kauffman Stadium on May 19, the Royals gave 18,000 fans who attended the game a George Brett Pine Tar bobblehead to celebrate the incident and Royals victory. It depicts Brett, after his home run was nullified, rushing at the umpires in anger.

In 2010, Major League Baseball amended the official rules with a comment on rule 1.10(c) clarifying the consequences of using excessive pine tar on a bat. The comment codifies the interpretation of the rule issued by American League president Lee MacPhail in his reversal:

If no objections are raised prior to a bat’s use, then a violation of Rule 1.10(c) on that play does not nullify any action or play on the field and no protests of such play shall be allowed.

== Scoring ==
Summary – top of the 9th inning
Pitcher New York Yankees	Batter Kansas City Royals	Result (outs in bold)	Score Royals – Yankees	Date played
Dale Murray (R)	Don Slaught (R)	**Ground out to shortstop**	3–4	July 24
Dale Murray (R)	Pat Sheridan (L)	**Line out to first baseman**	3–4	July 24
Dale Murray (R)	U L Washington (S)	Single up the middle	3–4	July 24
Rich Gossage (R)	George Brett (L)	Home run to right	5–4	July 24
George Frazier (R)	Hal McRae (R)	**Strikeout**	5–4	August 18

== Game results ==
July 24, 1983 2:06 pm (EDT) at Yankee Stadium in Bronx, New York
Team	1	2	3	4	5	6	7	8	9	R	H	E
**Kansas City Royals**	0	1	0	1	0	1	0	0	2	**5**	**13**	**0**
New York Yankees	0	1	0	0	0	3	0	0	0	**4**	**8**	**0**
WP: Mike Armstrong (5–5) LP: Goose Gossage (7–4) Sv: Dan Quisenberry (24); Home runs: KCR: George Brett (20); NYY: Dave Winfield (16); Attendance: 33,944

=== Box score ===
Kansas City	AB	R	H	RBI	BB	SO	AVG
Willie Wilson, CF	3	0	0	0	0	1	.278
Pat Sheridan, PH-CF	2	0	0	0	0	1	.262
U L Washington, SS	5	1	1	0	0	1	.233
George Brett, 3B	5	1	3	2	0	0	.357
Greg Pryor, 3B	0	0	0	0	0	0	.257
Hal McRae, DH	4	0	0	0	1	1	.324
Amos Otis, RF	4	0	1	0	0	1	.269
John Wathan, 1B-LF-1B	3	2	1	0	1	0	.269
Leon Roberts, LF	3	0	2	0	0	0	.272
Willie Aikens, PH-1B	1	0	0	0	0	0	.322
Joe Simpson, LF	0	0	0	0	0	0	.175
Frank White, 2B	4	1	2	2	0	0	.249
Don Slaught, C	4	0	3	1	0	0	.256
**Team totals**	38	5	13	5	2	4	.342

Kansas City	IP	H	R	ER	BB	SO	HR	ERA
Bud Black	6	7	4	4	0	2	1	3.59
Mike Armstrong (W, 5–5)	2	1	0	0	0	0	0	3.58
Dan Quisenberry (S, 24)	1	0	0	0	0	0	0	1.88
**Team totals**	9	8	4	4	2	2	1	4.00

New York	AB	R	H	RBI	BB	SO	AVG
Bert Campaneris, 2B	4	1	2	0	0	0	.354
Ken Griffey, Sr., 1B	0	0	0	0	0	0	.333
Graig Nettles, 3B	3	0	0	0	1	1	.267
Lou Piniella, RF	4	1	1	0	0	0	.304
Jerry Mumphrey, CF	0	0	0	0	0	0	.238
Butch Wynegar, C	0	0	0	0	0	0	.320
Don Baylor, DH	4	1	1	2	0	0	.301
Dave Winfield, CF-LF	4	1	3	2	0	0	.258
Steve Kemp, LF-RF	4	0	0	0	0	0	.261
Steve Balboni, 1B	2	0	0	0	0	1	.220
Don Mattingly, PH-1B-2B	2	0	0	0	0	0	.286
Roy Smalley, SS	4	0	1	0	0	0	.269
Rick Cerone, C	2	0	0	0	1	0	.183
Ron Guidry, CF	0	0	0	0	0	0	. —
Oscar Gamble, PH	1	0	0	0	0	1	.307
**Team totals**	31	4	8	4	2	5	.258

New York	IP	H	R	ER	BB	SO	HR	ERA
Shane Rawley	5 1/3	10	3	3	2	2	0	4.03
Dale Murray	3 1/3	2	1	1	0	2	0	4.58
Goose Gossage (BS, 7) (L, 7–4)	0	1	1	1	0	0	1	2.23
George Frazier	0 1/3	0	0	0	0	0	0	3.52
**Team totals**	9	13	5	5	2	5	1	5.00

Goose Gossage faced one batter in the top of the 9th inning.

== In popular culture ==
In 1983, folk and "hillbilly" artist Red River Dave McEnery released "The Pine-Tarred Bat (The Ballad of George Brett)" on Longhorn Records.

Country music artist C. W. McCall dedicated the 1985 song "Pine Tar Wars" to the event, composing a lyric that features an accurate telling of the relevant facts of the story. The lyric is strongly critical of Billy Martin, referring to him as "Tar Baby Billy".

== See also ==
- Pine tar § Baseball
- List of nicknamed MLB games and plays
- Louisville Slugger – the bat brand used in the incident
