= 1980 World Series =

1980 Major League Baseball championship series

Team (Wins)	Managers	Season
Philadelphia Phillies (4)	Dallas Green	91–71 (.562), GA: 1
Kansas City Royals (2)	Jim Frey	97–65 (.599), GA: 14
- Dates: October 14–21
- Venue(s): Veterans Stadium (Philadelphia); Royals Stadium (Kansas City)
- MVP: Mike Schmidt (Philadelphia)
- Umpires: Harry Wendelstedt (NL), Bill Kunkel (AL), Paul Pryor (NL), Don Denkinger (AL), Dutch Rennert (NL), Nick Bremigan (AL)
- Hall of Famers: Phillies: Steve Carlton; Mike Schmidt; Royals: George Brett

Broadcast
- Television: NBC
- TV announcers: Joe Garagiola, Tony Kubek, and Tom Seaver
- Radio: CBS
- Radio announcers: Vin Scully and Sparky Anderson
- ALCS: Kansas City Royals over New York Yankees (3–0)
- NLCS: Philadelphia Phillies over Houston Astros (3–2)

The 1980 World Series was the championship series of Major League Baseball's (MLB) 1980 season. The 77th edition of the World Series, it was a best-of-seven playoff played between the National League (NL) champion Philadelphia Phillies and the American League (AL) champion Kansas City Royals. The Phillies defeated the Royals in six games to secure the team's first World Series championship in franchise history. Third baseman Mike Schmidt was named the World Series MVP.

The series concluded with Game 6 in Philadelphia, which ended with closer Tug McGraw striking out Willie Wilson at 11:29 pm EDT on Tuesday, October 21. Wilson set a World Series record by striking out 12 times in the six-game set (after 230 hits (and 81 strikeouts) in the regular season). Game 6 is also significant because it stands as the most-watched game in World Series history, with a television audience of 54.9 million viewers.

The Kansas City Royals became the second expansion team, and the first from the American League, to appear in the World Series. The AL had to wait until 1985 before one of their expansion teams—the Royals—won a World Series.

This was the first of six World Series played entirely on artificial turf (1985, 1987, 1993, 2020, 2023). This was also the first World Series since 1920, and the last until 2026, in which neither team had a previous World Series title. With their victory, the Phillies became the final team out of the original 16 MLB teams to win a World Series.

Overall, it was the 6th time a Philadelphia team won the World Series (the Athletics won 5 in their original home city, most recently in 1930, before leaving for Kansas City in 1955). In professional sports, it was the only postseason meeting between a Philadelphia team and a Kansas City team until the Kansas City Chiefs and Philadelphia Eagles met in Super Bowl LVII 43 years later.

== Background ==
The Philadelphia Phillies won the National League East division by one game over the Montreal Expos, then defeated the Houston Astros three games to two to win the National League Championship Series. The Kansas City Royals won the American League West division by 14 games over the Oakland Athletics, then swept the New York Yankees for the American League pennant

Two first-year managers, Dallas Green of the Phillies and Jim Frey of the Royals, fought to win a first World Championship for their respective clubs. This was the first appearance for the Phillies since losing to the New York Yankees in 1950 and just their third overall, having lost also to the Boston Red Sox in 1915.

The Royals entered the league as an expansion team in 1969. They had early success under the leadership of Whitey Herzog, winning their division from 1976 to 1978, but lost each year to the New York Yankees in the American League Championship Series (ALCS), finally exacting revenge with a sweep of the Yankees in 1980. The Phillies had a strikingly similar run entering this Series, as they were also divisional winners from 1976 to 1978, but lost three straight NLCS: to the Cincinnati Reds in 1976, and the Los Angeles Dodgers in 1977 and 1978. In 1980, they finally triumphed, rallying on the road to eliminate the Houston Astros.

=== Philadelphia Phillies ===
The Philadelphia Phillies entered the 1980 season as the only original National League team not to have won a World Series. Established in 1883, the franchise had gone 97 years without a championship. They reached the postseason five times in those 97 years, winning pennants in 1915 and 1950, along with three straight NL East titles in 1976, 1977 and 1978.

The Phillies' 1980 squad included the NL Most Valuable Player, third-baseman Mike Schmidt (48 HR, 121 RBI, .286 BA), and Cy Young Award winner, lefty Steve Carlton (24–9, 2.34 ERA). This mostly veteran club finished between first and third in almost all offensive categories in the National League. Thirty-nine-year-old Pete Rose led the club in hits (185) and doubles (42), while center fielder Garry Maddox and utility outfielder Lonnie Smith combined for 68 steals. The pitching staff was led by Carlton and 17-game-winner Dick Ruthven. In the bullpen was the screwballer Tug McGraw, in his third Series.

=== Kansas City Royals ===
The Kansas City Royals were one of four expansion teams that began play in 1969. (The other American League entry was the Seattle Pilots; the National League teams were the San Diego Padres and Montreal Expos.) They quickly became competitive, achieving a winning record in their third season with an 85–76 win–loss record. By 1976, the young team was becoming the dominant force in the American League West, winning 90 or more games in four consecutive seasons from 1975 to 1978. Unfortunately for the Royals, they could not get over the hump of the New York Yankees, losing three straight ALCS to New York from 1976 to 1978.

The 1980 Royals had a Most Valuable Player of their own with their third-baseman George Brett, who flirted with the sacred .400 mark all summer with an average above .400 as late as September 19, before settling for a .390 batting average, with 24 homers and 118 RBI in 117 games. The heart and soul of the Royals was surrounded by a corps of veterans: Amos Otis, super-designated-hitter Hal McRae, solid second-baseman Frank White, and switch-hitting leadoff man Willie Wilson, who finished the season with 230 hits and 79 stolen bases. Six KC pitchers had ten or more wins, led by 20-game-winner Dennis Leonard (20–11, 3.79) and left-hander Larry Gura (18–10, 2.95). Submariner closer Dan Quisenberry won 12 games out of the bullpen and accumulated 33 saves, tied for best in the American League with Rich Gossage. On their way to the World Series in 1980, the Royals would finally beat the New York Yankees in the ALCS.

== Summary ==
NL Philadelphia Phillies (4) vs. AL Kansas City Royals (2)

Game	Date	Score	Location	Time	Attendance
1	October 14	Kansas City Royals – 6, Philadelphia Phillies – 7	Veterans Stadium	3:01	65,791
2	October 15	Kansas City Royals – 4, Philadelphia Phillies – 6	Veterans Stadium	3:01	65,775
3	October 17	Philadelphia Phillies – 3, Kansas City Royals – 4 (10)	Royals Stadium	3:19	42,380
4	October 18	Philadelphia Phillies – 3, Kansas City Royals – 5	Royals Stadium	2:37	42,363
5	October 19	Philadelphia Phillies – 4, Kansas City Royals – 3	Royals Stadium	2:51	42,369
6	October 21	Kansas City Royals – 1, Philadelphia Phillies – 4	Veterans Stadium	3:00	65,838

== Matchups ==
=== Game 1 ===
October 14, 1980 8:30 pm (ET) at Veterans Stadium in Philadelphia, Pennsylvania 47 °F (8 °C), clear
Team	1	2	3	4	5	6	7	8	9	R	H	E
Kansas City	0	2	2	0	0	0	0	2	0	6	9	1
Philadelphia	0	0	5	1	1	0	0	0	X	7	11	0
WP: Bob Walk (1–0) LP: Dennis Leonard (0–1) Sv: Tug McGraw (1); Home runs: KC: Amos Otis (1), Willie Aikens 2 (2); PHI: Bake McBride (1)

Phillies' starter Bob Walk became the third rookie to start the first game of a World Series, the first since Joe Black of the Brooklyn Dodgers in 1952. The Royals jumped on him early with a pair of two-run home runs: in the second, Amos Otis lifted one to left after a leadoff walk of Darrell Porter, and Willie Aikens went over right-center with two outs in the third, following Hal McRae's single up the middle and a called strikeout of George Brett. The K.C. threat continued until Porter was thrown out at home. In their half of the third, the Phils rallied off Dennis Leonard. Shortstop Larry Bowa singled with one out, stole second and scored on catcher Bob Boone's double. Lonnie Smith's RBI single then cut the Royals' lead to 4–2, but Smith was caught in a rundown heading back to first, which allowed Boone to score. With the bases clear and two outs, Pete Rose was hit on the calf and Mike Schmidt walked on five pitches. Bake McBride launched a 1-1 pitch to right-center for a three-run home run and the Phillies led 5–4; designated hitter Greg Luzinski fanned for the third out.

In the fourth inning, Manny Trillo chopped a high bouncer over Leonard for an infield single, advanced to second on an errant pickoff throw, and to third as Bowa bounced to second for the second out. Ninth in the order and with a 3-1 count, Boone doubled again to score Trillo and knock Leonard out of the game. Reliever Renie Martin retired Smith on a fly out to right.

After loading the bases in the fifth with one out on a single, hit-by-pitch, and walk off Martin, Garry Maddox's sacrifice fly to left on full count scored Schmidt for a 7–4 lead. Trillo popped out to first to end the threat. Hitless Brett opened the eighth with a double to left-center off of Walk, and went to third on a wild pitch to Aikens, who hit another two-run home run to right-center to cut the lead to one. Closer Tug McGraw entered with the bases clear and no outs, faced the minimum in the final two innings for a 7–6 Phillies victory.

Prior to this victory, the Phillies had not won a World Series game since Game 1 in 1915 against the Boston Red Sox, when Grover Cleveland Alexander had pitched a shutout.

=== Game 2 ===
October 15, 1980 8:20 pm (ET) at Veterans Stadium in Philadelphia, Pennsylvania 55 °F (13 °C), mostly cloudy
Team	1	2	3	4	5	6	7	8	9	R	H	E
Kansas City	0	0	0	0	0	1	3	0	0	4	11	0
Philadelphia	0	0	0	0	2	0	0	4	X	6	8	1
WP: Steve Carlton (1–0) LP: Dan Quisenberry (0–1) Sv: Ron Reed (1)

Game 2 was a pitchers' duel between left-handers Larry Gura and Steve Carlton. After a one-out single and subsequent double in the fifth, Manny Trillo's sacrifice fly and Larry Bowa's RBI single put the Phillies up 2–0. The Royals cut it to 2–1 when Amos Otis scored from second on Trillo's error on Willie Aikens's ground ball in the sixth. Carlton looked in control until, acting on a complaint from Kansas City manager Jim Frey that he was using a foreign substance on the ball; the umpires made Carlton wash his hands.

In the seventh, Carlton loaded the bases on three walks, the last intentional, and Otis ripped a double into the left-field corner to drive in two, then John Wathan's sacrifice fly to center extended the Royals' lead to 4–2; questionably, Otis was caught in a rundown after also tagging up from second; Rose cut the ball and threw to Schmidt, who tagged him halfway back to second to end the inning.

The Phillies rallied in the eighth inning off closer Dan Quisenberry; after a leadoff walk to Bob Boone, pinch hitter Del Unser's RBI double to left-center cut the Royals' lead to 4–3. A groundout to first by Pete Rose advanced Unser to third, and a high-chopper single by Bake McBride over the drawn-in infield tied the score. Mike Schmidt drove in McBride to take the lead with a double off the wall in right-center, then scored on Keith Moreland's single up the middle to lead by two. Pinch hitter Greg Gross grounded into a 6-4-3 double play.

Ron Reed took over for Carlton in the ninth, struck out two, and held the Royals scoreless for the save as Philadelphia went up 2–0 heading to Kansas City.

=== Game 3 ===
October 17, 1980 7:30 pm (CT) at Royals Stadium in Kansas City, Missouri 51 °F (11 °C), clear
Team	1	2	3	4	5	6	7	8	9	10	R	H	E
Philadelphia	0	1	0	0	1	0	0	1	0	0	3	14	0
Kansas City	1	0	0	1	0	0	1	0	0	1	4	11	0
WP: Dan Quisenberry (1–1) LP: Tug McGraw (0–1); Home runs: PHI: Mike Schmidt (1); KC: George Brett (1), Amos Otis (2)

K.C. got back in the series with an extra inning victory at home in Game 3 on Friday night. Having returned from minor surgery after Game 2, George Brett began the scoring with a first-inning solo home run into the right-field stands off Philadelphia starter Dick Ruthven. The Phillies loaded the bases in the second off the Royals' Rich Gale with one out on two singles and a walk, but only scored once on Lonnie Smith's groundout. In the fourth, K.C.'s Willie Aikens tripled with one out and scored on Hal McRae's single, but Mike Schmidt's home run in the fifth again tied the game and knocked Gale out of the game. Amos Otis gave the Royals a 3–2 lead in the seventh with a home run, but Pete Rose's RBI single with two on in the eighth off Renie Martin (who had relieved Gale) again tied the game. Ruthven pitched nine innings and was relieved in the tenth. The game headed into extra innings and in the bottom of the tenth, Willie Aikens drove in Willie Wilson with a single to left-center off Tug McGraw to give Kansas City a 4–3 win.

=== Game 4 ===
October 18, 1980 12:45 pm (CT) at Royals Stadium in Kansas City, Missouri 54 °F (12 °C), partly cloudy
Team	1	2	3	4	5	6	7	8	9	R	H	E
Philadelphia	0	1	0	0	0	0	1	1	0	3	10	1
Kansas City	4	1	0	0	0	0	0	0	X	5	10	2
WP: Dennis Leonard (1–1) LP: Larry Christenson (0–1) Sv: Dan Quisenberry (1); Home runs: PHI: None; KC: Willie Aikens 2 (4)

A beautiful Saturday afternoon was the setting for Game 4. The Royals jumped all over Phillies starter Larry Christenson in the bottom of the first. Willie Wilson singled and advanced to third base on an errant pickoff attempt, George Brett tripled him in, and Willie Aikens smashed his third home run of the series. The onslaught continued when Amos Otis doubled in Hal McRae, who had also doubled, to give the Royals a 4–0 lead right out of the gate. Christenson would only last 1/3 of an inning before being relieved. After the Phillies scored a run in the second on Larry Bowa's RBI single off Dennis Leonard, Aikens hit his second home run of the game in the bottom half and became the first player in World Series history to have a pair of two-home run games. The Phillies cut away at the Royals' lead on sacrifice flies by Bob Boone off Leonard in the seventh and Mike Schmidt off Dan Quisenberry in the eighth (the run charged to Leonard), but fell short as Leonard held them in check and Dan Quisenberry finished the game to help Leonard atone for his Game 1 loss. The Royals won 5–3 to tie the series. Despite the Royals victory, Game 4 is best remembered for Dickie Noles' fourth-inning brushback pitch under Brett's chin that ultimately prompted the umpires to issue warnings to each team. Brett told Baseball Digest in March 1998 that he had "no idea if that [brushback pitch by Noles] turned the Series around. All I know is we lost." Mike Schmidt, in his book Clearing The Bases, called it "the greatest brushback in World Series history." Aikens later said that he had been expecting it to happen to him, in retaliation for his two home runs.

=== Game 5 ===
October 19, 1980 3:30 pm (CT) at Royals Stadium in Kansas City, Missouri 61 °F (16 °C), sunny
Team	1	2	3	4	5	6	7	8	9	R	H	E
Philadelphia	0	0	0	2	0	0	0	0	2	4	7	0
Kansas City	0	0	0	0	1	2	0	0	0	3	12	2
WP: Tug McGraw (1–1) LP: Dan Quisenberry (1–2); Home runs: PHI: Mike Schmidt (2); KC: Amos Otis (3)

Played in the sun and shadows on Sunday afternoon, pivotal Game Five was scoreless through three innings. In the top of the fourth, Pete Rose laced a line drive off starter Larry Gura, but was thrown out by second baseman Frank White. Bake McBride dragged a bunt to Gura, but first baseman Willie Aikens' foot was not on the base. On a 2–2 count, Mike Schmidt homered to center to put the Phillies up 2–0. Greg Luzinski grounded out to third and Keith Moreland popped out to third.

In the bottom of the fifth, U L Washington singled to center, and Willie Wilson hit a grounder between shortstop and third that was an infield single. After a sacrifice bunt from White that nearly went for a hit, George Brett's RBI groundout to second off Marty Bystrom cut the Phillies' lead to 2–1. Aikens walked, but Hal McRae flew out to the base of the right field foul pole to strand Wilson at third.

In the Kansas City sixth, red-hot Amos Otis tied the game with a leadoff home run to left. After solid singles by Clint Hurdle and Darrell Porter put runners on the corners with no outs, Bystrom was relieved by Ron Reed, who allowed a sacrifice fly to left by Washington which put the Royals up 3–2. Wilson doubled to right, but Porter was thrown out at home by Manny Trillo's relay, and White fouled out to third.

In the top of the seventh, Schmidt flew out to right, and Luzinski walked. Smith came in to run and Moreland singled, ending Gura's day. Closer Dan Quisenberry induced fielder's choice groundouts by Maddox and Trillo to end the threat. In the bottom half against closer Tug McGraw, Brett and Aikens struck out swinging, then McRae doubled to left. Otis was intentionally walked, and José Cardenal batted for Hurdle, but flew out to center on the first pitch.

In the Phillies' eighth, Bowa nearly beat out a grounder out to second, then Bob Boone reached on a low throw by Brett and continued to second. Rose grounded out to second and Boone went to third but was stranded when McBride also grounded to second. In the bottom half, Porter grounded out to second, Washington fanned, and Wilson chopped a slow grounder towards third, but was thrown out by McGraw.

Down by a run, Schmidt led off the ninth inning with an infield single off of drawn-in third baseman Brett's glove. Pinch hitter Del Unser drove him home from first with a double that bounced over Aikens' glove and into the right-field corner. After a bunt down the first baseline by Moreland moved Unser to third, Garry Maddox grounded to third for the second out. On an 0–2 count, Trillo drove in the go-ahead run with a line shot that ricocheted off Quisenberry for an infield hit, almost thrown out by Brett. Bowa grounded to shortstop on a high hopper to end the inning.

In the bottom of the ninth, White led off with a walk, Brett was caught looking, Aikens walked on four pitches, and was lifted for pinch-runner Onix Concepción. McRae hit a fly well down the line that was just foul, then grounded to shortstop for a fielder's choice. Otis walked on four pitches to load the bases, but McGraw silenced the crowd by striking out Cardenal with an inside fastball on a 1–2 count to end the game.

Coinciding with the Phillies' victory, the Philadelphia Eagles and Philadelphia Flyers also won on the same day.

=== Game 6 ===
October 21, 1980 8:20 pm (ET) at Veterans Stadium in Philadelphia, Pennsylvania 61 °F (16 °C), mostly cloudy
Team	1	2	3	4	5	6	7	8	9	R	H	E
Kansas City	0	0	0	0	0	0	0	1	0	1	7	2
Philadelphia	0	0	2	0	1	1	0	0	X	4	9	0
WP: Steve Carlton (2–0) LP: Rich Gale (0–1) Sv: Tug McGraw (2)

With a chance to close out the series at home in Game 6, Steve Carlton was the starter for Philadelphia. In the bottom of the third, Bob Boone walked, then was safe at second on Lonnie Smith's ground ball, as shortstop U L Washington was past the base when he caught the ball from the second baseman Frank White. Pete Rose then bunted for a single down the third-base line to load the bases. Mike Schmidt's single to right-center scored two, which ended Royals' starter Rich Gale's night and gave Carlton all the runs he needed. Renie Martin entered with runners at the corners and no outs and retired the side: Bake McBride fouled out, Greg Luzinski hit a soft liner to third, and Garry Maddox flew to right.

In the fifth, Smith hustled to turn a routine single to left-center into a double, advanced to third on Rose's fly to left-center, and Schmidt walked on a full count. Lefthander Paul Splittorff relieved Martin, and McBride's slow groundout to shortstop moved up both runners to put the Phillies up 3–0. Luzinski also grounded out to shortstop. Next inning, Maddox singled to left, but Manny Trillo grounded back to Splittorff for 1-6-3 double play. On a 2–2 count, Larry Bowa doubled to left and scored on Boone's single to center, making it 4–0 Phillies. Smith flew out to right-center.

John Wathan walked on eight pitches to lead off the eighth and José Cardenal singled to left to end Carlton's night, relieved by closer Tug McGraw. White fouled out to first, Willie Wilson walked on five pitches to load the bases. Washington flew to left-center for a sacrifice fly, George Brett got an infield hit to reload the bases, but Hal McRae grounded out to second. In the bottom half, closer Dan Quisenberry set the Phillies down in order (Maddox, Trillo, Bowa).

In the top of the ninth, the City of Philadelphia deployed a police force ready to take the field with some officers mounted on horses and some armed with K-9 dogs. This action proved effective preventing fans from storming onto the field when the game ended. Royals leadoff batter Amos Otis was caught looking on a breaker, Willie Aikens drew a walk on a full count, and Onix Concepción came in to run. Wathan singled to right, and Cardenal singled to center to load the bases. White fouled out on the first pitch, bobbled by Boone, and caught by Rose in front of the Phillies' dugout. Wilson fell behind on an 0–2 count, took a pitch slightly high, then fanned on a fastball to end the Series.

It was the 12th time Wilson struck out in this Series, setting a new World Series record. The previous mark of 11 had been held jointly by Eddie Mathews and Wayne Garrett in 1958 and 1973, respectively. It stood until 2009, when Ryan Howard struck out 13 times, ironically on a Phillies team which lost to the New York Yankees. Boone's knees were so sore by the end of the World Series that he could barely make it to the mound after the final out was recorded.

When the World Series began in 1903, the National and American Leagues each had eight teams. With their victory in 1980, the Phillies became the last of the "Original Sixteen" franchises to win a Series (although the St. Louis Browns never won a Series in St. Louis, waiting until 1966, twelve years after becoming the Baltimore Orioles).

While third baseman Schmidt was the official MVP of the 1980 World Series, the Babe Ruth Award (another World Series MVP) was given to closer McGraw.

Despite the loss, Royals first baseman Willie Aikens had a phenomenal World Series, batting .400 with 8 hits (out of 20 times at bat), 8 RBIs and 4 home runs.

== Composite box ==
1980 World Series (4–2): Philadelphia Phillies (N.L.) over Kansas City Royals (A.L.)

Team	1	2	3	4	5	6	7	8	9	10	R	H	E
Philadelphia Phillies	0	2	7	3	5	1	1	6	2	0	27	59	2
Kansas City Royals	5	3	2	1	1	3	4	3	0	1	23	60	7
Total attendance: 324,516 Average attendance: 54,086; Winning player's share: $34,693 Losing player's share: $32,212

== Broadcasting ==
NBC broadcast the World Series on television, with play-by-play announcer Joe Garagiola, color commentators Tony Kubek and Tom Seaver, and field reporter Merle Harmon. Bryant Gumbel anchored the pre- and post-game shows, while former pitching great Bob Gibson and umpire Ron Luciano also contributed to NBC's coverage. This would be the final World Series where Garagiola was the sole play-by-play announcer on television. The next time NBC broadcast a World Series, Garagiola split play-by-play duties with Dick Enberg. After that series, he was moved to color commentator to make room for Vin Scully.

Independent station WPHL-TV in Philadelphia, the Phillies' television rights holder, simulcast NBC's broadcast to its local viewers. Phillies broadcasters Richie Ashburn, Harry Kalas, Tim McCarver, and Andy Musser hosted a locally produced pregame show prior to each of the six games. During WPHL's coverage of Game 6, the station lost power for a whole hour when a Philadelphia Electric transmitter that carried its local broadcast of the game stopped working.

CBS Radio also carried the World Series nationally, with Vin Scully handling the play-by-play and Sparky Anderson the color commentary. Win Elliot anchored the pre-and post-game shows for the network.

At this time, CBS Radio held total broadcast exclusivity for the World Series, including in each team's market. Thousands of Phillies fans, outraged that they couldn't hear their local announcers call the games, deluged the team, the networks, and the Commissioner's office with angry letters and petitions. The following year, Major League Baseball changed its broadcast contract to allow the flagship radio stations for participating World Series teams to produce and air their own local World Series broadcasts, beginning in 1982. (The CBS Radio feed could potentially be heard in those markets on another station which held the network's rights.) WPHL-TV produced a "re-creation" of the game for Phillies fans with Harry Kalas, Richie Ashburn, and Andy Musser commentating over the NBC video, which aired in November along with the team's NL East-clinching game in Montreal and three games of the NLCS against Houston. When the Phillies next won a World Series, in 2008, Kalas was able to make the live call of the final out on local radio.

This World Series is tied with the 1978 World Series for the highest overall television ratings to date, with the six games averaging a Nielsen rating of 32.8 and a share of 56.

== Aftermath ==
Minutes after the final out, Pennsylvania Governor Dick Thornburgh issued a proclamation declaring the next day "Philadelphia Phillies Day" in the state. That day, a parade down Broad Street celebrated the Phillies win. About half a million attended the parade, the first ticker-tape parade down Broad Street since the Flyers won the Stanley Cup in 1975, as it made its way to John F. Kennedy Stadium. Another 800,000 gathered around the stadium. The parade was part of a day of statewide celebrations throughout Pennsylvania, per Thornburgh's proclamation.

In 1980, all four of Philadelphia's major professional sports teams played for the championship of their respective sports, but only the Phillies were victorious. The 76ers lost in the NBA Finals to the Los Angeles Lakers in mid-May, eight days later the Flyers lost in the Stanley Cup Final to the New York Islanders, and the Eagles would lose to the Oakland Raiders in Super Bowl XV in January 1981. In conjunction with championships won by two teams from Pittsburgh (the Pirates won the World Series a year before, and the Steelers won Super Bowls XIII and XIV), the commonwealth of Pennsylvania as a whole had three title teams in a span of two years.

Soon after the World Series, members of both teams played for a week on Family Feud with host Richard Dawson. The week of shows was billed as a World Series Rematch Week. The Royals won three out of the five games played, with all the money going to charity.

The 1980 World Series was the first of numerous World Series that journeyman outfielder Lonnie Smith (then with the Phillies) participated in. He was also a part of the 1982 World Series (as a member of the St. Louis Cardinals), 1985 World Series (as a member of the Kansas City Royals), and the 1991 and 1992 World Series as a member of the Atlanta Braves. The two Braves seasons were the only years in which he played for the losing team in the Series.

The 1980 series was the first of three postseason meetings between a Philadelphia team and a Kansas City team in professional sports. The next occurring was in the National Football League between the Kansas City Chiefs and the Philadelphia Eagles in Super Bowl LVII 43 years later, where the Chiefs defeated the Eagles 38-35. The latest was in Super Bowl LIX in 2025, where the Eagles would defeat the Chiefs in a blowout victory, 40-22.

== See also ==
- 1980 Japan Series
