= Jim Gaudet =

American baseball player (born 1955)

- Catcher
- Born: June 3, 1955 (age 71); New Orleans, Louisiana, U.S.
- Batted: Right Threw: Right

MLB debut
- September 10, 1978, for the Kansas City Royals

Last MLB appearance
- September 30, 1979, for the Kansas City Royals

MLB statistics
- Batting average: .071
- Hits: 1
- Games played: 6
- Stats at Baseball Reference

Teams
- Kansas City Royals (1978–1979)

James Jennings Gaudet (born June 3, 1955) is an American former Major League Baseball catcher who played for two seasons. He played for the Kansas City Royals in three games during the 1978 Kansas City Royals season and 1979 Kansas City Royals seasons.

Raised Catholic, Gaudet converted to Judaism during his career.
