= Willie Aikens =

American baseball player (born 1954)

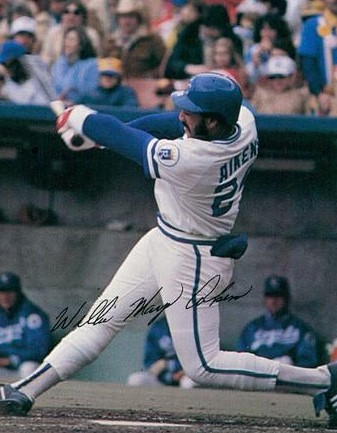
- First baseman
- Born: October 14, 1954 (age 72); Seneca, South Carolina, U.S.
- Batted: Left Threw: Right

MLB debut
- May 17, 1977, for the California Angels

Last MLB appearance
- April 27, 1985, for the Toronto Blue Jays

MLB statistics
- Batting average: .271
- Home runs: 110
- Runs batted in: 415
- Stats at Baseball Reference

Teams
- California Angels (1977, 1979); Kansas City Royals (1980–1983); Toronto Blue Jays (1984–1985)

Willie Mays Aikens (born October 14, 1954) is an American former professional baseball first baseman who played in Major League Baseball for the California Angels, Kansas City Royals, and Toronto Blue Jays between 1977 and 1985. He had established himself as one of the top sluggers in the game before drugs derailed his career. In 1994, Aikens was sentenced to 20 years in prison on four counts of crack cocaine distribution and one count of use of a firearm during drug trafficking. He was released on June 4, 2008, after changes in federal drug laws, and is sometimes cited as an example of the results of mandatory maximum sentencing in drug-related crimes.

== Early life ==
Aikens grew up in poverty in the Bruce Hill community of Seneca, South Carolina. He was a standout athlete in baseball, football and basketball at Seneca High School, and attended historically black South Carolina State University on a baseball and football scholarship. When S.C. State dropped baseball after Aikens' freshman year, Willie McNeil, Aikens' high school baseball coach, helped him catch on with a semi-professional summer baseball league in Baltimore, Maryland. While playing in Baltimore, he caught the attention of California Angels scout Walter Youse and was selected by the Angels with the number two overall pick in the January 1975 MLB draft.

== MLB career ==
=== California Angels ===
Aikens soon emerged as one of the top sluggers in California's farm system, hitting a league-leading thirty home runs and driving in 117 runs for the El Paso Diablos in 1976.

He began the 1977 season at the Angels Triple-A affiliate in Salt Lake City where he hit 14 home runs and with a strong .336. batting average. He was called up to the Angels major league roster at the end of the Minor League season in September where in 91 at-bats in 42 games he hit an unimpressive .198, without any home runs.

Aikens returned to his slugging ways in 1978, batting .326 with 29 home runs and 110 runs batted in (RBIs) for the Pacific Coast League's Salt Lake City Gulls. He returned to the majors in 1979, assuming DH duties and replacing Rod Carew at first base in June and July while Carew was out with a thumb injury and was very productive. He batted .280 with 21 home runs and 81 RBIs his rookie season.

=== Kansas City Royals ===
The Angels traded Aikens and Rance Mulliniks to the Kansas City Royals for Al Cowens and Todd Cruz at the Winter Meetings on December 6, 1979, with Craig Eaton being sent to California to complete the transaction four months later on April 1, 1980. Aikens inherited the first base job upon his arrival in Kansas City despite not being a very good fielder (he committed a league-leading 12 errors in 1980). Recovering from knee surgery, he got off to a slow start but hit well in the second half of the season. He finished second to George Brett on his team in both home runs and RBIs with 20 and 98, respectively. The Royals won their division by 14 games to face the New York Yankees in the American League Championship Series for the fourth time in five years. After having come up short in 1976, 1977 and 1978, the Royals swept the Yankees in three games in the 1980 American League Championship Series to face the Philadelphia Phillies in the World Series.

Aikens hit two home runs in Game 1 (his 26th birthday) and Game 4 of the 1980 World Series. He was, until Chase Utley accomplished the same feat in 2009, the only player in World Series history to hit two home runs in the same game twice during the same World Series. He also collected the game-winning RBI in the tenth inning of Game 3, the Royals' first-ever win of a World Series game. Aikens batted .400, but the Royals lost the World Series in six games.

Aikens led the Royals in both home runs and RBIs in the strike shortened 1981 season. His Royals returned to the postseason, but were swept by the Oakland Athletics in the 1981 American League Division Series. For his part, Aikens batted .333 (three for nine) and also reached base three times via base on balls. However, he failed to score or drive in any runs.

Aikens batted over .300 for the first time in his career in 1983, only to see his career rapidly begin to decline afterwards. Toward the end of the 1983 season, Aikens and several of his Royals teammates were questioned by U.S. attorney Jim Marquez in connection with a federal cocaine probe. Following the season, Aikens, Jerry Martin and Willie Wilson pleaded guilty to attempting to purchase cocaine, while former teammate Vida Blue pleaded guilty to possession of three grams of cocaine. Aikens, Blue, Martin and Wilson were all sentenced to three months in prison.

=== Toronto Blue Jays ===
Shortly after Aikens' November 17 sentencing, the Royals traded him to the Toronto Blue Jays for designated hitter Jorge Orta. Aikens was originally suspended by Baseball Commissioner Bowie Kuhn for a year. Following a May 15, 1984 review, he was reinstated. In 93 games, Aikens hit 11 home runs and drove in 26.

The Blue Jays released Aikens a month into the 1985 season, and re-signed him to a minor league contract. In his final major league at bat, on April 27, Aikens hit a pinch-hit two-run home run in the ninth inning to tie the ballgame—the Blue Jays won the game in the tenth inning. Nevertheless, Aikens was let go and despite a healthy .311 batting average and 16 home runs with the Syracuse Chiefs, he never returned to the majors. He played four games for the New York Mets' AAA affiliate, the Tidewater Tides in 1986 before heading to Mexico to join the Mexican Pacific League's Yaquis de Obregón.

=== Mexican baseball ===
Aikens played for six years in the Mexican League, where he was regularly among the league's top hitters; he batted .454 in 1986, one of the highest single-season averages in professional baseball history. Aikens played for the Pericos de Puebla from 1986 to 1987, Charros de Jalisco in 1988, Bravos de León from 1989 to 1990 and Industriales de Monterrey in 1991.

Aikens also played winter baseball in the Mexican Pacific League, doing so with the Yaquis and the Venados de Mazatlán from 1986 to 1989. In 2012, Venados de Mazatlán retired his number.

== Arrest ==
Aikens had developed a heavy cocaine habit and, by his own admission, was constantly using the drug from 1991 to 1994. Supposedly, a former lover tipped off the Kansas City, Missouri Police Department that Aikens was selling narcotics at his home.

Aikens was arrested on March 2, 1994, and after a March 17 mistrial, a grand jury indicted Aikens on four charges of crack cocaine distribution in violation of 21 U.S.C on March 25.

Because of the tougher federal guidelines for crack, he was sentenced as if he had sold 15 pounds (6.8 kg) of powder cocaine. He received the maximum sentence of 15 years and eight months, and received an additional five years because he had a loaded gun in the room where the drugs were sold.

== Life after prison ==
Aikens served his prison sentence in United States Penitentiary, Atlanta, and was scheduled to be released in 2012. He was released on June 4, 2008, three months after Congress approved new guidelines in the federal drug laws and made them retroactive. Hal McRae, the only former Royals teammate with whom Aikens corresponded while in prison, set Aikens up with a job in road construction, working in manholes.

Since his release, Aikens has spoken at schools about his experiences and to the Royals' young players, always hoping to return to baseball. In November 2008, he apologized to Royals fans and the people of Kansas City in the Kansas City Star.

On February 1, 2011, the Royals announced that they had hired Aikens as a minor league coach who will be based at the franchise's complex at Surprise, Arizona. The employment was delayed when his wife, Sara, suffered a stroke, believed to have been a complication of lupus.

Aikens has three daughters: Nicole and Sarita with Sara, and Lucia from a previous relationship.

His life after prison is chronicled in the 2022 film The Royal.
