= Rance Mulliniks =

American baseball player (born 1956)

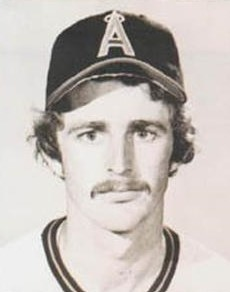
- Third baseman / Designated hitter / Shortstop
- Born: January 15, 1956 (age 70); Tulare, California, U.S.
- Batted: Left Threw: Right

MLB debut
- June 18, 1977, for the California Angels

Last MLB appearance
- September 18, 1992, for the Toronto Blue Jays

MLB statistics
- Batting average: .272
- Home runs: 73
- Runs batted in: 435
- Stats at Baseball Reference

Teams
- California Angels (1977–1979); Kansas City Royals (1980–1981); Toronto Blue Jays (1982–1992)

Career highlights and awards
- World Series champion (1992)

Steven Rance Mulliniks (born January 15, 1956) is an American former Major League Baseball player.

== Playing career ==
Drafted as a shortstop, Mulliniks made his major league debut in 1977 for the California Angels, batting .269 in 78 games. He saw limited playing time over the following years with the California Angels until 1979 and with the Kansas City Royals in 1980 and 1981. He had been traded along with Willie Aikens from the Angels to the Royals for Al Cowens and Todd Cruz at the Winter Meetings in Toronto on December 6, 1979, with Craig Eaton being sent to California to complete the transaction four months later on April 1, 1980.

Mulliniks' luck changed when he was traded to the Toronto Blue Jays, just before the start of the 1982 season. He was converted to third base and platooned at that position as the left handed hitting half with Garth Iorg until Iorg's retirement after the 1987 season. He appeared in over 100 games each year through 1989. He batted over .300 three times (1984, 1987 and 1988) and demonstrated great patience at the plate, regularly posting on-base percentages near .400. In 1984, Sports Illustrated named him to their "Dream Team" as a utility infielder.

In 1992, Mulliniks played only three regular season games for the Blue Jays, and none in the Blue Jays' postseason run to their first World Series, as he struggled with injuries.

Mulliniks retired after the 1992 season having compiled a .272 career batting average, 73 home runs, 435 RBI, and 445 runs. He holds the Blue Jays franchise single season fielding percentage record for third basemen (.975) and the franchise record for most pinch hits (59).

== Post-playing career ==
Mulliniks has been a colour commentator for Blue Jays coverage on Rogers Sportsnet, and alongside Jim Hughson and Jesse Barfield on CBC Sports in 2007 and 2008. In 2009, Mulliniks filled in for Jerry Remy for Boston Red Sox coverage on NESN, for the Red Sox May 29–31 road trip to Toronto.

Mulliniks is now a real estate agent in Visalia, California. He coached at College of the Sequoias and operated Mulliniks Baseball School.
