= Todd Cruz =

American baseball player (1955–2008)

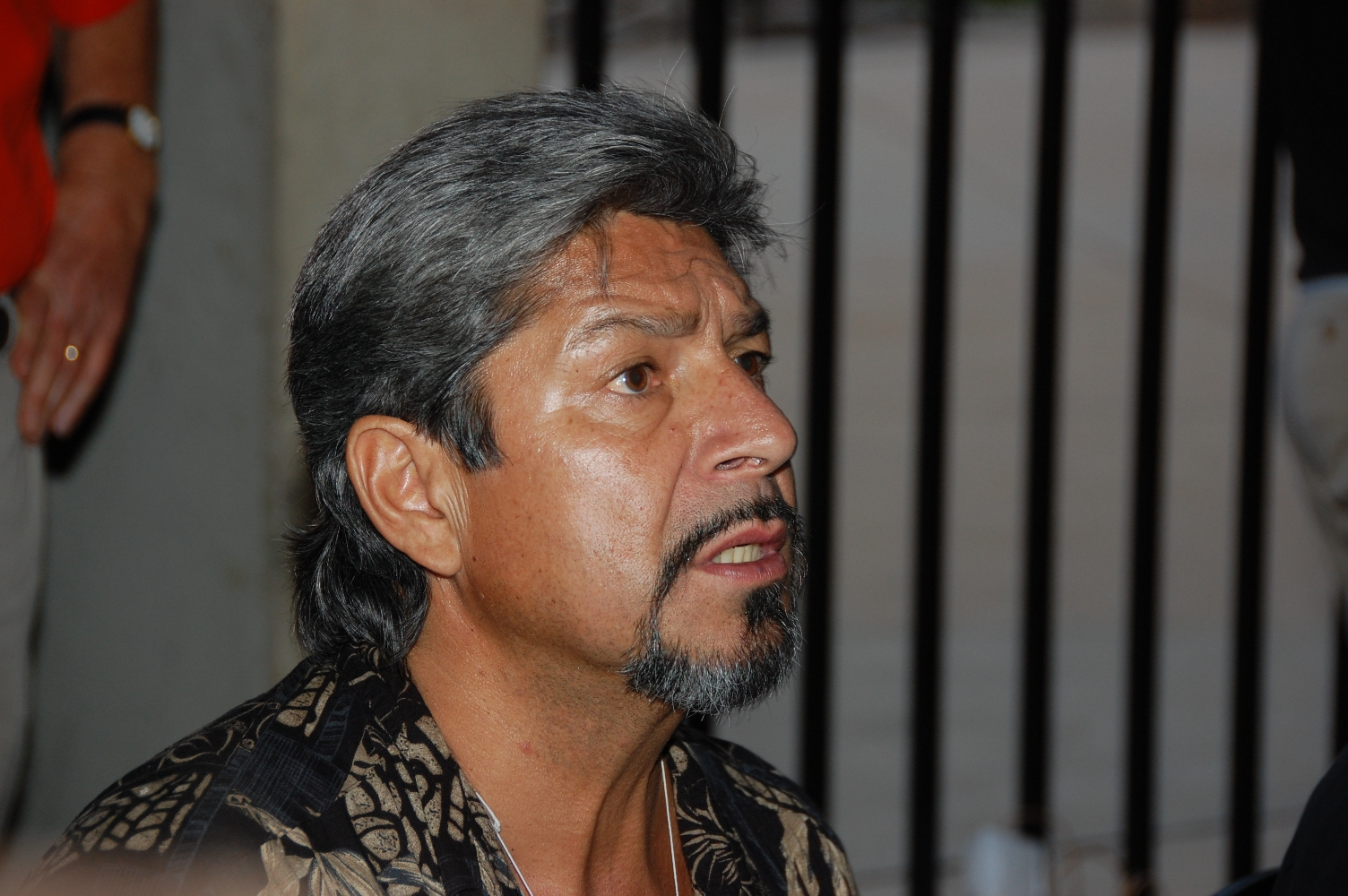
- Cruz in 2008
- Shortstop / Third baseman
- Born: November 23, 1955; Highland Park, Michigan
- Died: September 2, 2008 (aged 52); Bullhead City, Arizona
- Batted: Right Threw: Right

MLB debut
- September 4, 1978, for the Philadelphia Phillies

Last MLB appearance
- September 30, 1984, for the Baltimore Orioles

MLB statistics
- Batting average: .220
- Home runs: 34
- Runs batted in: 154
- Stats at Baseball Reference

Teams
- Philadelphia Phillies (1978); Kansas City Royals (1979); California Angels (1980); Chicago White Sox (1980); Seattle Mariners (1982–1983); Baltimore Orioles (1983–1984)

Career highlights and awards
- World Series champion (1983)

Todd Ruben Cruz (November 23, 1955 – September 2, 2008), was an American professional baseball shortstop and third baseman, who played in Major League Baseball (MLB) between 1978 and 1984 with the Philadelphia Phillies, Kansas City Royals, California Angels, Chicago White Sox, Seattle Mariners, and Baltimore Orioles. He batted and threw right-handed.

== Early years ==
Of Mexican-American descent, Cruz was born in Highland Park, Michigan, in Metro Detroit and was raised in Mexicantown in Detroit. He attended Western High School in Detroit.

== Early baseball career ==
Cruz was selected by the Philadelphia Phillies out of high school in the second round (26th overall) of the MLB amateur entry draft in June 1973, signing a contract later that month. He finally made his major league debut five years later, playing only three games in September 1978 with the Phillies. With Larry Bowa established as the everyday shortstop, Cruz was traded to the Royals for Doug Bird on April 3, 1979, three days before the start of a new season.

The Royals, with a glut of outfielders, a need for a starting first baseman and having decided on U.L. Washington as its regular shortstop, dealt Cruz along with Al Cowens to the Angels for Willie Aikens and Rance Mulliniks at the Winter Meetings in Toronto on December 6, 1979, with Craig Eaton being sent to California to complete the transaction four months later on April 1, 1980. A midseason swap for right-handed pitcher Randy Scarbery on June 12, 1980 sent Cruz to the Chicago White Sox, where he became the starting shortstop. Unfortunately, a back injury sidelined him for the entire 1981 season.

In May 1981, Cruz was arrested in Edmonton, Alberta, where he had been sent to play on a 20-day loan to the White Sox's Triple-A farm team, and charged with breaking and entering an Edmonton department store and stealing $2,500 worth of watches. He told the Chicago Tribune's Robert Markus that he was drunk when he made his way into the Hudson's Bay department store. "I guess I didn't know what I was doing or I never would have done it," Cruz told Markus. "I didn't need anything they had in that store." Cruz, who prosecutors later said had broken a plate glass window to gain entry and then used a hammer he found in the store to break into a watch display case, in July 1981 pleaded guilty to a reduced charge of attempted breaking and entering and theft and was given a conditional discharge and nine months probation.

The White Sox's search for a reliable batter capable of hitting for average resulted in Cruz being shipped, along with Jim Essian and Rod Allen, to the Seattle Mariners for Tom Paciorek on December 11, 1981. The 1982 campaign was Cruz's most productive offensively, as he established career highs with 57 runs batted in (RBI), 44 runs scored, 113 hits, and 16 home runs. He was supplanted as the regular shortstop by rookie Spike Owen the following year.

== Success with the Orioles ==
The Baltimore Orioles purchased Cruz's contract on June 30, 1983. In his first Orioles game on July 1, against the Detroit Tigers, he drove in six runs with a three-run homer and a bases-loaded double, leading the Orioles to a victory in Detroit, where he grew up. His biggest contribution was on defense. Manager Joe Altobelli explained Cruz's importance to the ballclub:

The biggest move we made was when we got Todd Cruz from Seattle. General manager Hank Peters made a great move there. Leo Hernández, he was a little late in getting the ball to second base, and his range was a little shallow. Todd Cruz was playing shortstop for Seattle when we got him. We moved him over to third base. He had real good range and got rid of the ball real quick. He solidified our infield for the second half.

Shortstop Cal Ripken Jr. praised him even further:

In the first part of the year, we were going back and forth at third base. It was an issue for us. But when Todd Cruz came over and was put at third base, he went from a shortstop with real good range to a third baseman with great range. Defensively, with the type of pitching staff we had, he was very instrumental in taking hits away from the hole and turning double plays. And offensively, he contributed a lot in certain games. He allowed me to play further up the middle. I didn't have to shade toward the hole a little bit. As a matter of fact, it became the exact opposite. If there was a pull hitter up, I felt that with his range to the left, he could cover so much ground there, so I only needed to cover to that ground, and then I could position myself further up the middle. I think both of us were able to cover more of the left side of the infield because he had some great range.

Cruz, along with teammates at the bottom of the batting order Rick Dempsey and Rich Dauer, were famously nicknamed "The Three Stooges." Cruz was "Curly," while Dempsey and Dauer were "Moe" and "Larry," respectively. After winning the American League pennant three games to one over the White Sox, Cruz's former team, the Orioles won the World Series in five games over Cruz's original ballclub, the Phillies.

Cruz's MLB career came to an end on March 29, 1985, when he was released by the Orioles in spring training. Orioles teammate Gary Roenicke said of Cruz's two seasons in Baltimore, "Even though he'd played for many other teams, he always thought of himself as an Oriole. He had an outgoing personality ... and he kept everybody loose."

In 1995, Cruz was a replacement player in spring training for the Phillies during the ongoing strike.

== Death ==
Cruz died on September 2, 2008, at age 52, while swimming in the pool at the apartment complex where he lived in Bullhead City, Arizona. The efforts of bystanders and responding paramedics to revive him were unsuccessful. The cause of death was a heart attack.
