= Craig Eaton =

American baseball player (1954–2025)

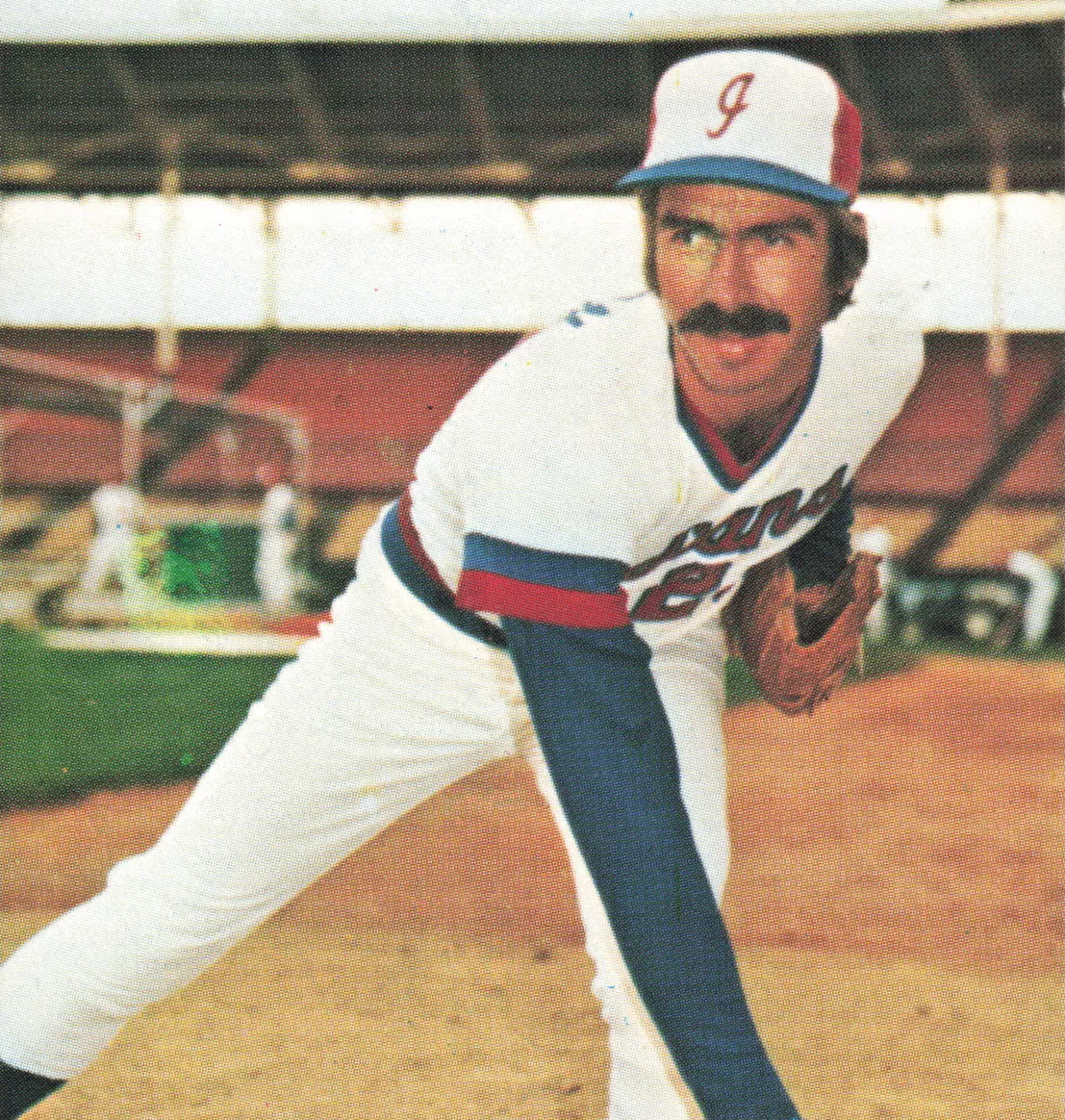
- Eaton with the Indianapolis Indians c. 1984
- Pitcher
- Born: September 7, 1954; Glendale, Ohio, U.S.
- Died: October 14, 2025 (aged 71); Jupiter, Florida, U.S.
- Batted: Right Threw: Right

MLB debut
- September 5, 1979, for the Kansas City Royals

Last MLB appearance
- September 28, 1979, for the Kansas City Royals

MLB statistics
- Win–loss record: 0–0
- Earned run average: 2.70
- Strikeouts: 4
- Stats at Baseball Reference

Teams
- Kansas City Royals (1979)

Craig Eaton (September 7, 1954 – October 14, 2025) was an American Major League Baseball pitcher who played for one season. He was a pitcher who pitched in five games for the Kansas City Royals during the 1979 season. Eaton played college baseball at Florida State University.

== Biography ==
Eaton attended Lake Worth Community High School (Lake Worth Beach, Florida) and graduated in the class of 1972 at the age of 17. He went to Miami-Dade College (Miami, FL) for 2 years and was drafted by the Kansas City Royals in the 6th round of the 1974 MLB June Amateur Draft. He declined the draft to complete his B.S. in Marine Biology at Florida State University. After graduating, he signed with the Kansas City Royals on June 25 as a free agent, and was called up to the major leagues toward the end of the 1979 season.

He was sent to the California Angels on April 1, 1980, to complete a transaction from four months prior on December 6, 1979, when the Royals acquired Willie Aikens and Rance Mulliniks for Al Cowens and Todd Cruz. At Angel's organization he played in the Triple-A Pacific Coast League (PCL), followed by Triple-A for the Detroit Tigers in 1983 and finished his career with the Montreal Expos in 1984. In the 1983 off-season, Craig sustained knee injuries on a golf course and had the first of three knee surgeries after completing the 1984 season.

Eaton married his high school sweetheart, Suzanne Sullivan, in 1977 and they had four daughters. He later lived in Lake Worth Beach, Florida. Eaton died in Jupiter, Florida, on October 14, 2025, at the age of 71.
