= Al Cowens =

American baseball player (1951–2002)

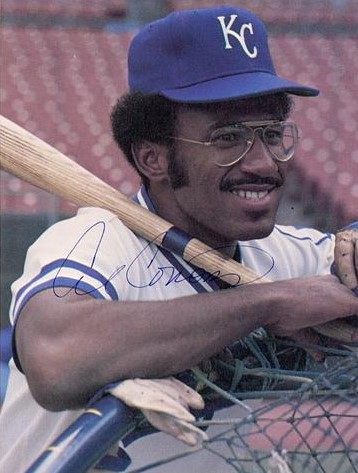
- Right fielder
- Born: October 25, 1951; Los Angeles, California, U.S.
- Died: March 11, 2002 (aged 50); Downey, California, U.S.
- Batted: Right Threw: Right

MLB debut
- April 6, 1974, for the Kansas City Royals

Last MLB appearance
- June 8, 1986, for the Seattle Mariners

MLB statistics
- Batting average: .270
- Home runs: 108
- Runs batted in: 717
- Stats at Baseball Reference

Teams
- Kansas City Royals (1974–1979); California Angels (1980); Detroit Tigers (1980–1981); Seattle Mariners (1982–1986)

Career highlights and awards
- Gold Glove Award (1977)

Alfred Edward Cowens, Jr. (October 25, 1951 – March 11, 2002) was an American right fielder in Major League Baseball. From 1974 through 1986, Cowens played for the Kansas City Royals (1974–79), California Angels (1980), Detroit Tigers (1980–81) and Seattle Mariners (1982–86). He batted and threw right-handed.

== Baseball career ==
A native of Los Angeles, California, Cowens was a product of the Kansas City Royals farm system, having been selected by the team in the 1969 MLB draft. He made his major league debut with the Royals in 1974 and played for them through 1979. His most productive season came in 1977, when he batted .312 with 23 home runs and 112 RBI, earned a Gold Glove, and finished second to Rod Carew in balloting for the American League MVP Award.

Cowens was traded along with Todd Cruz from the Royals to the California Angels for Willie Aikens and Rance Mulliniks at the Winter Meetings in Toronto on December 6, 1979, with Craig Eaton being sent to the Angels to complete the transaction four months later on April 1, 1980. The need for Cowens was the result of injuries to Joe Rudi and Dan Ford which hurt the Angels' chances of winning the American League pennant. A shortage of power hitters due to injuries to Don Baylor and Brian Downing by the second month of the 1980 season led to Cowens being dealt from the Angels to the Detroit Tigers for Jason Thompson on May 27, 1980. He played with the Tigers through the end of the 1981 season. In March 1982, the Tigers sold his contract the Seattle Mariners, where he played until the team released him on June 12, 1986.

Overall in 13 MLB seasons, Cowens appeared in 1584 MLB games, batting .270 with 108 home runs and 717 RBIs. He played in three postseason series, appearing in 14 total games with the Royals in the American League Championship Series of 1976 through 1978, each of which the team lost to the New York Yankees.

=== Farmer incidents ===
Early in the 1979 season, a notable feud started between Cowens, then with the Royals, and pitcher Ed Farmer, then with the Texas Rangers. On May 8, a Farmer pitch thrown in the top of the fifth inning fractured Cowens' jaw and broke several teeth, causing him to miss 21 games. Farmer later said that Cowens had attempted to steal signs from the catcher and thought the pitch would be a breaking ball away, but it was actually an inside fastball. At the start of the same game, Farmer had also hit Royals second baseman Frank White and broke his wrist, which kept him sidelined for a month.

The next season, on June 20‚ 1980, Farmer and Cowens faced each other again; Farmer now with the Chicago White Sox and Cowens now with the Tigers. In a game at Comiskey Park, with Farmer pitching, Cowens hit a ground ball to shortstop. While Farmer watched his infielders make the play, Cowens ran to the mound rather than first base, and tackled the pitcher from behind, landing several punches before the benches cleared and the two were separated. American League president Lee MacPhail suspended Cowens for seven games, and Farmer filed a criminal complaint, resulting in a warrant being issued for Cowens in Illinois. Later, Farmer agreed to drop the charges in exchange for a handshake‚ and the two players brought out the lineup cards before a game in Detroit on September 1, and shook hands. A later appearance by Cowens at Comiskey Park was greeted by fans with a "Coward Cowens" banner.

== Death ==
Cowens died in Downey, California, on March 11, 2002, at the age of 50 from a heart attack. At the time of his death, Cowens had been scouting players for the Kansas City Royals. He is buried at Inglewood Park Cemetery in Inglewood, California.

== See also ==
- List of Major League Baseball career putouts as a right fielder leaders
