= Mike Armstrong (baseball) =

American baseball player (born 1954)

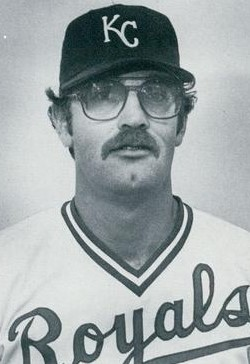
- Pitcher
- Born: March 7, 1954 (age 72); Glen Cove, New York, U.S.
- Batted: Right Threw: Right

MLB debut
- August 12, 1980, for the San Diego Padres

Last MLB appearance
- July 5, 1987, for the Cleveland Indians

MLB statistics
- Win–loss record: 19–17
- Earned run average: 4.10
- Strikeouts: 221
- Stats at Baseball Reference

Teams
- San Diego Padres (1980–1981); Kansas City Royals (1982–1983); New York Yankees (1984–1986); Cleveland Indians (1987)

Michael Dennis Armstrong (born March 7, 1954) is an American former Major League Baseball pitcher who played from 1980 to 1987, mainly as a relief pitcher. He played college baseball for the University of Miami.

== Career ==
Armstrong originally was drafted by the Cleveland Indians in the ninth round of the 1972 draft, but did not sign. He was then drafted by the Cincinnati Reds in the first round (24th overall) of the 1974 amateur draft. While still in the minors, Armstrong was traded to the San Diego Padres in 1979. He made appearances in the majors with the Padres in 1980 and 1981, but mainly played in the minor leagues. Prior to the start of the 1982 season, Armstrong was purchased by the Kansas City Royals. There, Armstrong pitched regularly, with over 100 innings in his two years with the team and had an earned run average under 4.00.

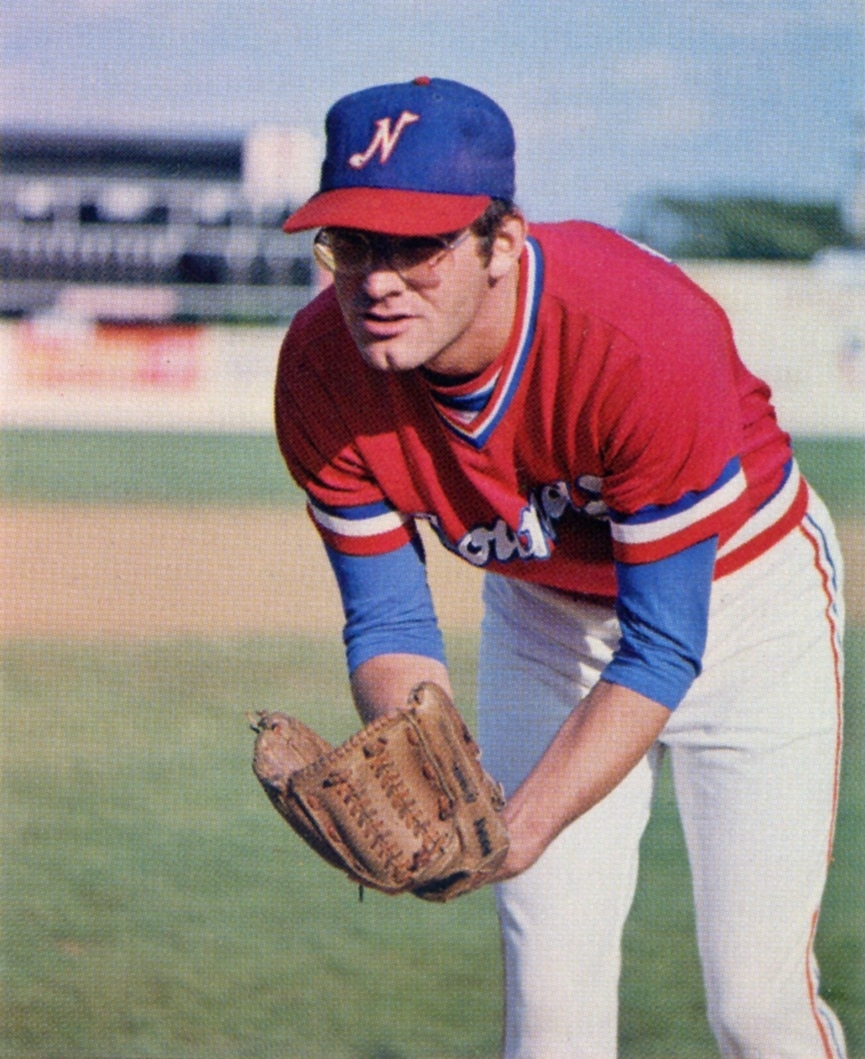
Armstrong with the Nashville Sounds in 1979

Armstrong played in the pine tar game between the Royals and the Yankees on July 24, 1983, earning the victory; a victory it took him almost a month to pick up. "It was wild to go back to New York and play these four outs in a totally empty stadium," Armstrong said. "I'm dressed in the uniform, and nobody's there." He went 10-7 that season in 58 appearances, notching career highs in wins and games.

The 6-foot-3 right-hander was traded to the Yankees after the 1983 season in a deal that brought Steve Balboni to the Royals. While Balboni went on to slug over 100 home runs and contributed to the Royals 1985 World Series triumph, Armstrong reported to spring training in 1984 with a sore arm, limiting him to two Grapefruit League appearances. As a result, Yankees owner George Steinbrenner filed a grievance with Baseball Commissioner Bowie Kuhn. Despite efforts to get another pitcher other than him from the Royals, Armstrong remained with the Yankees, though he spent most of his time with their AAA Columbus farm club from 1984 to 1986. Armstrong finished his Major League career with the Cleveland Indians in 1987.

In parts of 8 seasons he had a 19–17 win–loss record, pitching in 197 games with 1 start, 11 saves, 94 games finished, 338 innings pitched, 300 hits allowed, 170 runs allowed of which 154 were earned, 42 home runs allowed, 155 walks allowed, 221 strikeouts, 6 hit batsmen, 16 wild pitches, 1,439 batters faced, 20 intentional walks, 2 balks and a 4.10 ERA. His career WHIP was 1.346.

Following his playing career, Armstrong remained involved in baseball. He moved to South Boston, Virginia, where he helped found an adult baseball league and ran a local sporting goods store for five years. Then he worked in the construction business and as a painter until he turned 45, when his major league pension kicked in. He moved to Oconee County, Georgia, close to where his second wife Monica was from. A severe car accident left him with a rod in his right leg, but as of 2006, he was still pitching in a wooden bat league.
