= Bill Paschall =

American baseball player (born 1954)

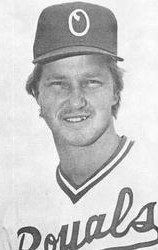
- Paschall in 1980
- Pitcher
- Born: April 22, 1954 (age 72); Norfolk, Virginia, U.S.
- Batted: Right Threw: Right

MLB debut
- September 20, 1978, for the Kansas City Royals

Last MLB appearance
- September 25, 1981, for the Kansas City Royals

MLB statistics
- Win–loss record: 0–2
- Earned run average: 5.32
- Strikeouts: 9
- Stats at Baseball Reference

Teams
- Kansas City Royals (1978–1979, 1981)

William Herbert Paschall (born April 22, 1954) is a former Major League Baseball pitcher. Paschall pitched in 11 games over three seasons for the Kansas City Royals between 1978 and 1981, all as a relief pitcher. On the final day of the 1978 regular season (October 1, 1978), Paschall recorded his only MLB save in a 1-0 Royals victory over the Twins.

Paschal was a two-sport standout at the University of North Carolina. He was a starting quarterback in football, leading the Tar Heels in passing in 1973 and 1975, and was an All-Atlantic Coast Conference selection as a starting pitcher in baseball. While playing for the Tar Heels from 1973 to 1976 he compiled a career 1.95 earned run average, which ranks fourth on the all-time list. He is tied for second on the UNC all-time list in complete games with 19, including 8 in 1976.

Paschall is an accomplished amateur golfer and set the competitive senior course record at Greensboro National Golf Club in 2016 with a 10-under-par 62.
