= Germán Barranca =

Mexican baseball player (born 1956)

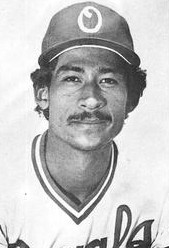
- Barranca in 1980
- Second baseman
- Born: October 19, 1956 (age 69); Veracruz, Veracruz, Mexico
- Batted: Left Threw: Right

MLB debut
- September 2, 1979, for the Kansas City Royals

Last MLB appearance
- July 11, 1982, for the Cincinnati Reds

MLB statistics
- Batting average: .290
- Home runs: 0
- Runs batted in: 3
- Stats at Baseball Reference

Teams
- Kansas City Royals (1979–1980); Cincinnati Reds (1981–1982)

Germán Barranca Costales (born October 19, 1956) is a Mexican former Major League Baseball second baseman.

On August 26, 1974 he was purchased by the Kansas City Royals from the Mexico City Reds. He was listed at 6 feet tall and 160 pounds. German made his major league debut on September 2, 1979 at the age of 22 with the Kansas City Royals vs the New York Yankees. German played 5 games that year and also played 7 games with the Royals in 1980 with a batting average of .600 in five at bats. On January 21, he was traded by the Kansas City Royals to the Cincinnati Reds for Cesar Geronimo. He played for the Cincinnati Reds in 1981 with a batting average of .333 in six at bats and in 1982 recorded a .255 batting average in 51 at bats. German last game in MLB was on July 11, 1982 vs. the Chicago Cubs at age 25. German was batting .250 and leading the National League in triples before the All Star break, was sent to Indianapolis, the Triple AAA affiliate of the Cincinnati Reds. On September 7, 1982, he was sent to the Detroit Tigers by the Cincinnati Reds as part of a conditional deal. German played 4 years in Major League Baseball (2 years in the American League played 12 games) and (2 years in the National League played 55 games) with a total of 67 games, 62 AB, 19 Runs, 18 hits, 2 doubles, 3 triples, 5 stolen bases, a fielding % of .893, and a batting average of .290

In 1979 playing for the Omaha Royals. German broke the stolen base record in the AAA American Association with 75 bases and was named the most valuable player in the Kansas City Royals Organization.

Barranca also played in the Mexican Pacific League, Mexico's winter baseball league for the Venados de Mazatlán, Naranjeros de Hermosillo, Potros de Tijuana and Algodoneros de Guasave. He set a record of 6 stolen bases in one game and held for years the most triples in the league's history.
