= Dan Quisenberry =

American baseball player (1953–1998)

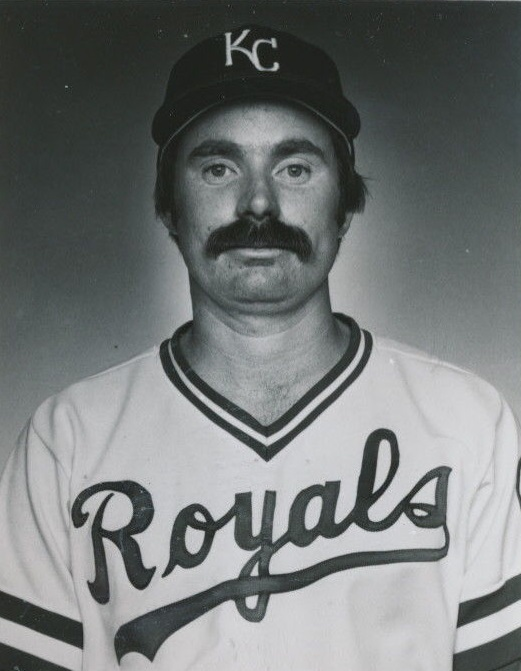
- Quisenberry in 1986
- Pitcher
- Born: February 7, 1953; Santa Monica, California, U.S.
- Died: September 30, 1998 (aged 45); Leawood, Kansas, U.S.
- Batted: Right Threw: Right

MLB debut
- July 8, 1979, for the Kansas City Royals

Last MLB appearance
- April 23, 1990, for the San Francisco Giants

MLB statistics
- Win–loss record: 56–46
- Earned run average: 2.76
- Strikeouts: 379
- Saves: 244
- Stats at Baseball Reference

Teams
- Kansas City Royals (1979–1988); St. Louis Cardinals (1988–1989); San Francisco Giants (1990)

Career highlights and awards
- 3× All-Star (1982–1984); World Series champion (1985); 5× AL Rolaids Relief Man Award (1980, 1982–1985); 5× AL saves leader (1980, 1982–1985); Kansas City Royals Hall of Fame

Daniel Raymond Quisenberry (/ˈkwɪzənbɛri/; February 7, 1953 – September 30, 1998), nicknamed "Quiz", was an American right-handed relief pitcher in Major League Baseball who played primarily for the Kansas City Royals. Notable for his submarine-style pitching delivery and his humorous quotes, he led the American League (AL) in saves a record five times (1980, 1982–85). In each season he led the league in saves, Quisenberry finished in the top five of the AL Cy Young Award voting, including runner-up finishes in 1983 and 1984 to LaMarr Hoyt and Willie Hernández, respectively. He retired in 1990 with 244 saves, the fifth-highest total in major league history at the time.

In addition to playing for the Royals, Quisenberry spent parts of two seasons with the St. Louis Cardinals and his final season with the San Francisco Giants.

== Early life ==
Quisenberry was born in Santa Monica, California. His name is the English mutation of the German surname Questenberg, a village in Saxony-Anhalt. His parents divorced when he was 7 years old, and his mother remarried Art Meola, a Rockwell International engineer who encouraged him and his older brother to play baseball. Quisenberry played baseball at Costa Mesa High School/Middle School. In 1973, while attending Orange Coast College, he was named team MVP. He was then recruited by the University of La Verne, a Church of the Brethren college, where he met his future wife, Janie Howard, while attending a class in square dancing.

== Career ==
=== Kansas City Royals ===
Quisenberry signed with the Royals as an amateur free agent in 1975 for a Class A team in Waterloo, Iowa, and pitched a complete game in his first start. At the end of the season, he was promoted to the Double-A team in Jacksonville, Florida. At the time, he worked for a sporting goods store during the day and a mortuary at night. In the winter of 1978, he attended Fresno Pacific University, affiliated with the Mennonite Brethren Church, to get a teaching degree in case his baseball career was not successful.

On July 8, 1979, at the age of 26, he made his major league debut with the Kansas City Royals against the Chicago White Sox, pitching 2 2/3 scoreless innings, and surrendering just two hits and no walks. Quisenberry appeared in 32 games and posted a 3–2 record with a 3.15 earned run average and five saves.

During spring training in 1980, manager Jim Frey suggested that Quisenberry learn the submarine-style delivery from Pittsburgh Pirates reliever Kent Tekulve to confuse hitters, because he could not overpower them with a fastball. From 1980 to 1985, Quisenberry was the American League's dominant closer leading the American League in saves every season except the strike-shortened 1981 season. During that time, he posted an ERA of 2.45 and won the Rolaids Relief Man Award each season. He also finished in the top five in voting for the Cy Young Award during this span. He won the Sporting News Reliever of the Year Award every year from 1982 to 1985.

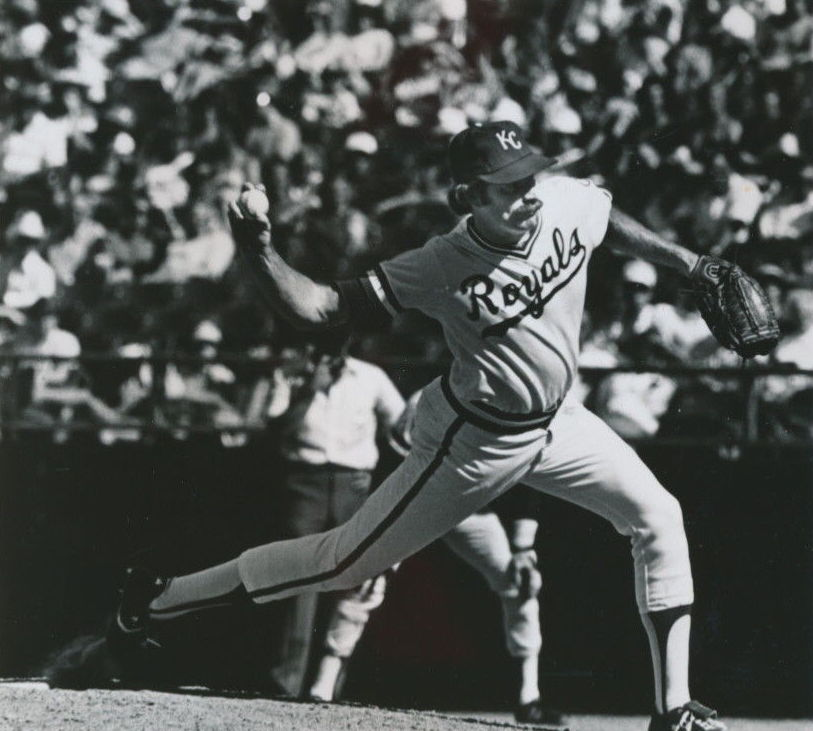
Quisenberry pitching for the Kansas City Royals

Unlike many closers, Quisenberry did not possess a hard fastball, and thus had to rely on pinpoint control, guile, and deception, which was augmented by the submarine delivery he first used in 1980. His primary pitch was a sinking fastball, which causes hitters to hit the ball on the ground rather than in the air. He also threw a curveball, a changeup he developed in 1984, and an occasional knuckleball. Although Quisenberry was not a strikeout pitcher (averaging only 3.3 strikeouts per nine innings during his career), he offset this deficiency by seldom walking batters or throwing wild pitches. His 45 saves in 1983 set a single-season MLB record, later tied in 1984 by Bruce Sutter and broken in 1986 by Dave Righetti, and set a team record that was tied in 1993 by Jeff Montgomery and surpassed in 2013 by Greg Holland. Quisenberry was the first pitcher in major league history to save more than 40 games in a season twice in his career. He won a World Series with the Royals in 1985 and was the winning pitcher of Game 6, notorious for Don Denkinger's blown call at first base.

In 1983, the Royals signed Quisenberry to a lifetime contract, similar to the contract of teammate George Brett. However, a rocky start in 1988 led to Quisenberry's relegation to middle relief and mop-up duty. Shortly before the All-Star break, he was released by the Royals.

=== St. Louis Cardinals and San Francisco Giants ===
Ten days later, the St. Louis Cardinals, managed by ex-Royals manager Whitey Herzog, signed Quisenberry as a free agent. After pitching for a year and a half in St. Louis, Quisenberry signed to play with the San Francisco Giants in 1990. He tore his rotator cuff just five appearances into the 1990 season; this was the first serious injury of his career. Quisenberry retired from baseball in 1990 with 244 saves, then the fifth-highest total in major league history.

=== Career legacy ===
In the 1996 Baseball Hall of Fame balloting by the Baseball Writers' Association of America, Quisenberry received 18 votes, just under the 24 vote (5%) cut-off to remain on the ballot. In the same election, Bruce Sutter, a pitcher with remarkably similar overall statistics, received 137 votes; Sutter went on to be elected to the National Baseball Hall of Fame and Museum in 2006. In 2013, Quisenberry's Hall of Fame candidacy was given a second look by the Expansion Era Committee, which re-examines the credentials of overlooked players from 1973–present, but he fell short of the 12 votes needed from the 16-member panel.

Along with Sutter and Rich Gossage, Quisenberry was part of the transition from "fire men" to the ninth inning closer popularized by manager Tony La Russa.

== Personal life ==
Quisenberry and his wife lived in Kansas City. They had two children, Alysia and David. The family supported the Harvesters Food Bank.

Quisenberry was religious. Originally considered a hothead, Quisenberry credited his wife as well as Christianity for calming him.

After his baseball career ended, Quisenberry published book of poetry, On Days Like This, in 1998. He was also one of baseball's most quotable characters, with bon mots like "I found a delivery in my flaw" and "I've seen the future and it's much like the present, only longer." The latter quote, however, had been published verbatim nearly two decades prior.

=== Death ===
In January 1998, Quisenberry cut short a snowboarding vacation in Colorado because of headaches, dizzy spells, and blurred vision. Quisenberry was diagnosed with grade IV astrocytoma, a highly malignant form of brain cancer. He died at age 45 on September 30, 1998, in Leawood, Kansas.

== See also ==
- List of Major League Baseball annual saves leaders
- List of notable brain tumor patients
- Major League Baseball titles leaders
