= George Brett =

American baseball player (born 1953)

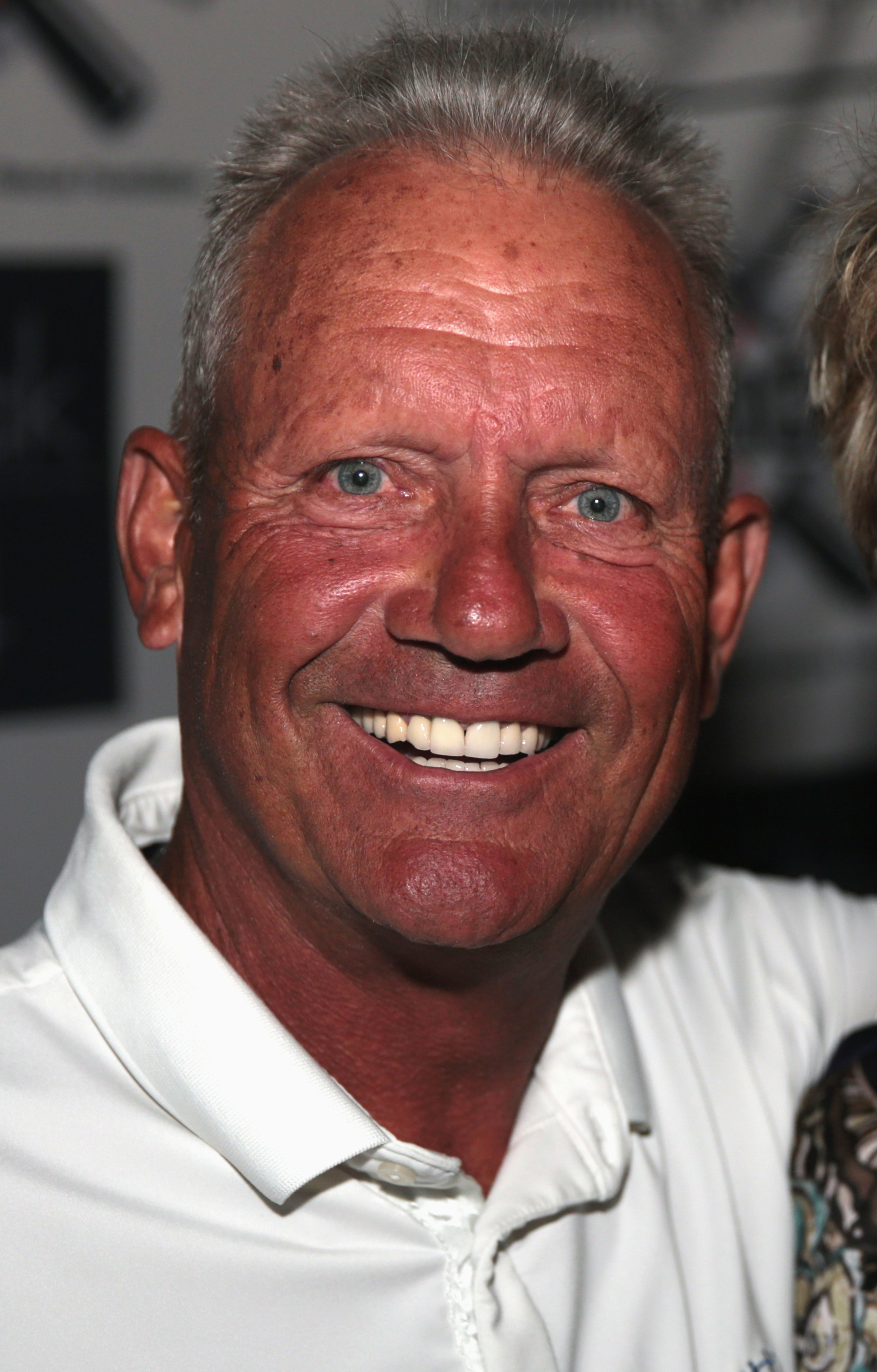
- Brett in 2017
- Third baseman / Designated hitter / First baseman
- Born: May 15, 1953 (age 73); Glen Dale, West Virginia, U.S.
- Batted: Left Threw: Right

MLB debut
- August 2, 1973, for the Kansas City Royals

Last MLB appearance
- October 3, 1993, for the Kansas City Royals

MLB statistics
- Batting average: .305
- Hits: 3,154
- Home runs: 317
- Runs batted in: 1,596
- Stats at Baseball Reference

Teams
- Kansas City Royals (1973–1993)

Career highlights and awards
- 13× All-Star (1976–1988); World Series champion (1985); AL MVP (1980); ALCS MVP (1985); Gold Glove Award (1985); 3× Silver Slugger Award (1980, 1985, 1988); 3× AL batting champion (1976, 1980, 1990); Kansas City Royals No. 5 retired; Kansas City Royals Hall of Fame

Member of the National

Baseball Hall of Fame
- Induction: 1999
- Vote: 98.2% (first ballot)

George Howard Brett (born May 15, 1953) is an American former professional baseball third baseman, designated hitter, and first baseman who played 21 seasons in Major League Baseball (MLB) for the Kansas City Royals.

Brett's 3,154 career hits are second most by any third baseman in major league history (after only Adrian Beltré's 3,166) and rank 18th all-time. He is one of five players in MLB history to accumulate 3,000 hits, 300 home runs, and a career .300 batting average (the others being Hank Aaron, Willie Mays, Miguel Cabrera, and Stan Musial). He was inducted into the Baseball Hall of Fame in 1999 in his first year of eligibility, and is the only player in MLB history to win a batting title in three different decades. He was also a member of the Royals' 1985 World Series victory over the St. Louis Cardinals.

Brett was named the Royals' interim hitting coach in 2013 on May 30, but he stepped down from the position on July 25 to resume his position of vice president of baseball operations. In 2015, he won his second World Series ring when the Royals won the series in five games over the New York Mets.

== Early life ==
Brett was born in Glen Dale, West Virginia, the youngest of four sons of a sports-minded family. Ken, the second oldest, became a major league pitcher who pitched in the 1967 World Series at age 19. Brothers John (eldest) and Bobby had brief careers in the minor leagues. All of George's brothers were born in Brooklyn.

Jack and Ethel Brett then moved the family from the Northern Panhandle of West Virginia to the Midwest, and three years later to El Segundo, California, a suburb of Los Angeles, just south of Los Angeles International Airport. George grew up hoping to follow in the footsteps of his older brothers. He graduated from El Segundo High School in 1971 and was selected by the Kansas City Royals in the second round (29th overall) of the 1971 Major League Baseball draft. He was high school teammates with pitcher Scott McGregor.

== Playing career ==
=== Minor leagues ===
Brett began his professional baseball career as a shortstop, but had trouble going to his right defensively and was soon shifted to third base. As a third baseman, his powerful arm remained an asset, and he remained at that spot for more than 15 years. Brett's minor league stops were with the Billings Mustangs for the Rookie-level Pioneer League in 1971, the San Jose Bees of the Class A California League in 1972, and the Omaha Royals of the Class AAA American Association in 1973, batting .291, .274, and .284, respectively.

=== Kansas City Royals (1973–1993) ===
==== 1973 ====
The Royals promoted Brett to the major leagues on August 2, 1973. He made his major league debut that day against the Chicago White Sox, going 1-for-4 as the starting third baseman. He played in 13 games, and hit .125 (5-for-40).

==== 1974 ====
Brett won the starting third base job in 1974 (replacing Paul Schaal), but struggled at the plate until he asked for help from Charley Lau, the Royals' batting coach. Spending the All-Star break working together, Lau taught Brett how to protect the entire plate and cover up some holes in his swing that experienced big-league pitchers were exploiting. Armed with this knowledge, Brett developed rapidly as a hitter, and finished the year with a .282 batting average, two home runs and 47 RBI in 113 games.

==== 1975–1979 ====
Brett topped the .300 mark for the first time in 1975, hitting .308 with 11 home runs and 90 RBI in 159 games. He finished the season leading the league in hits (195) and triples (13). He then won his first batting title in 1976 with a .333 average, seven home runs and 67 RBI in 159 games. The four contenders for the batting title that year were Brett and Royals teammate Hal McRae, and Minnesota Twins teammates Rod Carew and Lyman Bostock. In dramatic fashion, Brett went 2-for-4 in the final game of the season against the Twins, beating out his three rivals, all playing in the same game. His lead over second-place McRae was less than .001. Brett won the title when a fly ball dropped in front of Twins left fielder Steve Brye, bounced on the Royals Stadium AstroTurf and over Brye's head to the wall; Brett circled the bases for an inside-the-park home run. McRae, batting just behind Brett in the line up, grounded out and Brett won his first batting title.

From May 8 through May 13, 1976, Brett had three or more hits in six consecutive games, a major league record. A month later, he was on the cover of Sports Illustrated for a feature article, and made his first of 13 All-Star teams. The Royals won the first of three straight American League West Division titles, beginning a great rivalry with the New York Yankees—whom they faced in the American League Championship Series each of those three years. In the fifth and final game of the 1976 ALCS, Brett hit a three-run homer in the top of the eighth inning to tie the score at six—only to see the Yankees' Chris Chambliss launch a solo shot in the bottom of the ninth to give the Yankees a 7–6 win. Brett finished second in American League MVP voting to Thurman Munson.

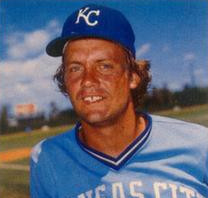
Brett with Kansas City, c. 1977

A year later, Brett emerged as a power hitter, batting .312 while clubbing 22 home runs and recording 88 RBI in 139 games, as the Royals headed to another ALCS. In Game 5 of the 1977 ALCS, following an RBI triple, Brett slid into third and was called safe then was kicked in the head by Graig Nettles, after which Brett stood and threw a punch at Nettles, igniting a bench-clearing brawl.

In 1978, Brett batted .294 (the only time between 1976 and 1983 in which he did not bat at least .300) with nine home runs and 62 RBI in 128 games, helping the Royals win a third consecutive AL West title. However, Kansas City once again lost to the Yankees in the ALCS, but not before Brett hit three home runs off Catfish Hunter in Game 3, becoming the second player to hit three home runs in an LCS game (Bob Robertson was the first, having done so in Game 2 of the 1971 NLCS).

Brett followed with a successful 1979 season, in which he finished third in AL MVP voting. He became the sixth player in league history to have at least 20 doubles, triples and homers all in one season (42–20–23) and led the league in hits (212) and triples (20) while batting .329, with an on-base percentage of .376 and a slugging percentage of .563.

==== 1980 ====
All these impressive statistics were just a prelude to 1980, when Brett won the American League MVP and batted .390, a modern record for a third baseman. He was also named The Sporting News Sportsman of the Year. Brett's batting average was at or above .400 as late in the season as September 19, and the country closely followed his quest to bat .400 for an entire season, a feat which has not been accomplished since Ted Williams in 1941.

Brett's 1980 batting average of .390 is second only to Tony Gwynn's 1994 average of .394 (Gwynn played in 110 games and had 419 at-bats in the strike-shortened season, compared to Brett's 449 at bats in 1980) for the highest single season batting average since 1941. Brett also recorded 118 runs batted in, while appearing in just 117 games; it was the first instance of a player averaging one RBI per game (in more than 100 games) since Walt Dropo thirty seasons prior. He led the American League in both slugging and on-base percentage.

Brett started out slowly, hitting only .259 in April. In May, he hit .329 to get his season average to .301. In June, the 27-year-old third baseman hit .472 (17-for-36) to raise his season average to .337, but played his last game for a month on June 10, not returning to the lineup until after the All-Star Break on July 10 due to him tearing a ligament in his foot while trying to steal second.

In July, after being off for a month, he played in 21 games and hit .494 (42-for-85), raising his season average to .390. Brett started a 30-game hitting streak on July 18, which lasted until he went 0-for-3 on August 19 (the following night he went 3-for-3). During those 30 games, Brett hit .467 (57-for-122). His high mark for the season came a week later, when Brett's batting average was at .407 on August 26, after he went 5-for-5 on a Tuesday night in Milwaukee. He batted .430 for the month of August (30 games), and his season average was at .403 with five weeks to go. For the three hot months of June, July, and August 1980, Brett played in 60 American League games and hit .459 (111-for-242), most of it after a return from a monthlong injury. For these 60 games, he had 14 home runs and 69 RBI.

Brett missed another 10 days in early September and hit just .290 for the month. His average was at .400 as late as September 19, but he then had a 4-for-27 slump, and the average dipped to .384 on September 27, with a week to play. For the final week, Brett went 10-for-19, which included going 2-for-4 in the final regular season game on October 4. His season average ended up at .390 (175 hits in 449 at-bats = .389755), and he averaged more than one RBI per game. Brett led the league in both on-base percentage (.454) and slugging percentage (.664) on his way to capturing 17 of 28 possible first-place votes in the MVP race. Since Al Simmons also batted .390 in 1931 for the Philadelphia Athletics, the only higher averages subsequent to 1931 were by Ted Williams of the Red Sox (.406 in 1941) and Tony Gwynn of the San Diego Padres (.394 in the strike-shortened 1994 season).

More importantly, the Royals won the American League West, and would face the AL East champion New York Yankees in the ALCS.

==== 1980 postseason ====
During the 1980 post-season, Brett led the Royals to their first American League pennant, sweeping the playoffs in three games from the rival Yankees who had beaten K.C. in the 1976, 1977 and 1978 playoffs. During Game 2 of the 1980 ALCS, Willie Randolph was on first base in the top of the eighth with two outs and the Royals up by just one run. Bob Watson hit a ball to the left field corner of Royals Stadium. The ball bounced right to Willie Wilson, but Wilson was not known for having a great arm, and third base coach Mike Ferraro waved Randolph home. Wilson overthrew U L Washington, the cut-off man, but Brett was in position behind him to catch the ball, then throw to Darrell Porter, who tagged out Randolph in a slide. TV cameras captured a furious George Steinbrenner fuming immediately after the play. The Royals won 3–2. Brett claimed after the game that he had deliberately positioned himself to cut off the throw in case Washington missed it, but Tommy John of the Yankees disagreed, thinking that if Brett had been backing up Washington, he would have been between shortstop and home plate, not over behind third base. Either way, he was in the perfect position to throw out Randolph. In Game 3, Brett hit a ball well into the third deck of Yankee Stadium off Yankees closer Goose Gossage. Gossage's previous pitch had been timed at 97 mph, leading ABC broadcaster Jim Palmer to say, "I doubt if he threw that ball 97 miles an hour." A moment later Palmer was given the actual reading of 98. "Well, I said it wasn't 97", Palmer replied. Brett then hit .375 in the 1980 World Series, but the Royals lost in six games to the Philadelphia Phillies. During the Series, Brett made headlines after leaving Game 2 in the sixth inning due to hemorrhoid pain. Brett had minor surgery the next day, and in Game 3 returned to hit a home run as the Royals won in 10 innings 4–3. After the game, Brett was famously quoted "...my problems are all behind me". In 1981, he missed two weeks of spring training to have his hemorrhoids removed.

==== 1981 ====
On May 14, 1981, Brett hit UPI photographer Tom Gralish in the head with a crutch while Gralish was photographing him after a loss at Royals Stadium. Brett apologized the following day. Roughly two weeks later, in a fit of anger, he destroyed two toilets and a sink at Metropolitan Stadium as reported by sportswriter Mike Fish. On September 15 at a hotel in Anaheim, Brett confronted Fish about his reporting. Brett pushed reporter Janis Carr and had to be restrained by teammates Willie Wilson and Greg Keatley. Police were called but no arrests were made.

==== Pine Tar Incident ====
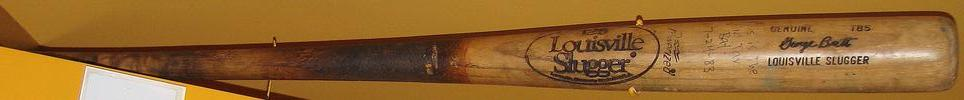
Baseball bat used by George Brett in the Pine Tar Incident on July 24, 1983

On July 24, 1983, in a game against the Yankees at Yankee Stadium, Brett hit a two-run homer off Goose Gossage in the top of the ninth inning with two out to put the Royals up 5–4. After the home run, Yankees manager Billy Martin cited to the umpires a rule stating that any foreign substance on a bat could extend no further than 18 inches from the knob. The umpires measured the amount of pine tar, a legal substance used by hitters to improve their grip, on Brett's bat. The pine tar extended about 24 inches, leading home plate umpire Tim McClelland to signal Brett out and end the game as a Yankees win. An enraged Brett charged out of the dugout directly toward McClelland, forcing the two umpires and Royals manager Dick Howser to physically restrain him.

The Royals quickly issued a challenge to the outcome. It was upheld by American League president Lee MacPhail, who ruled that while the bat should have been excluded from future use, the home run should not have been nullified. Amid much controversy, the game was resumed on August 18, 1983, from the point of Brett's home run and ended with a Royals win.

==== 1985 ====
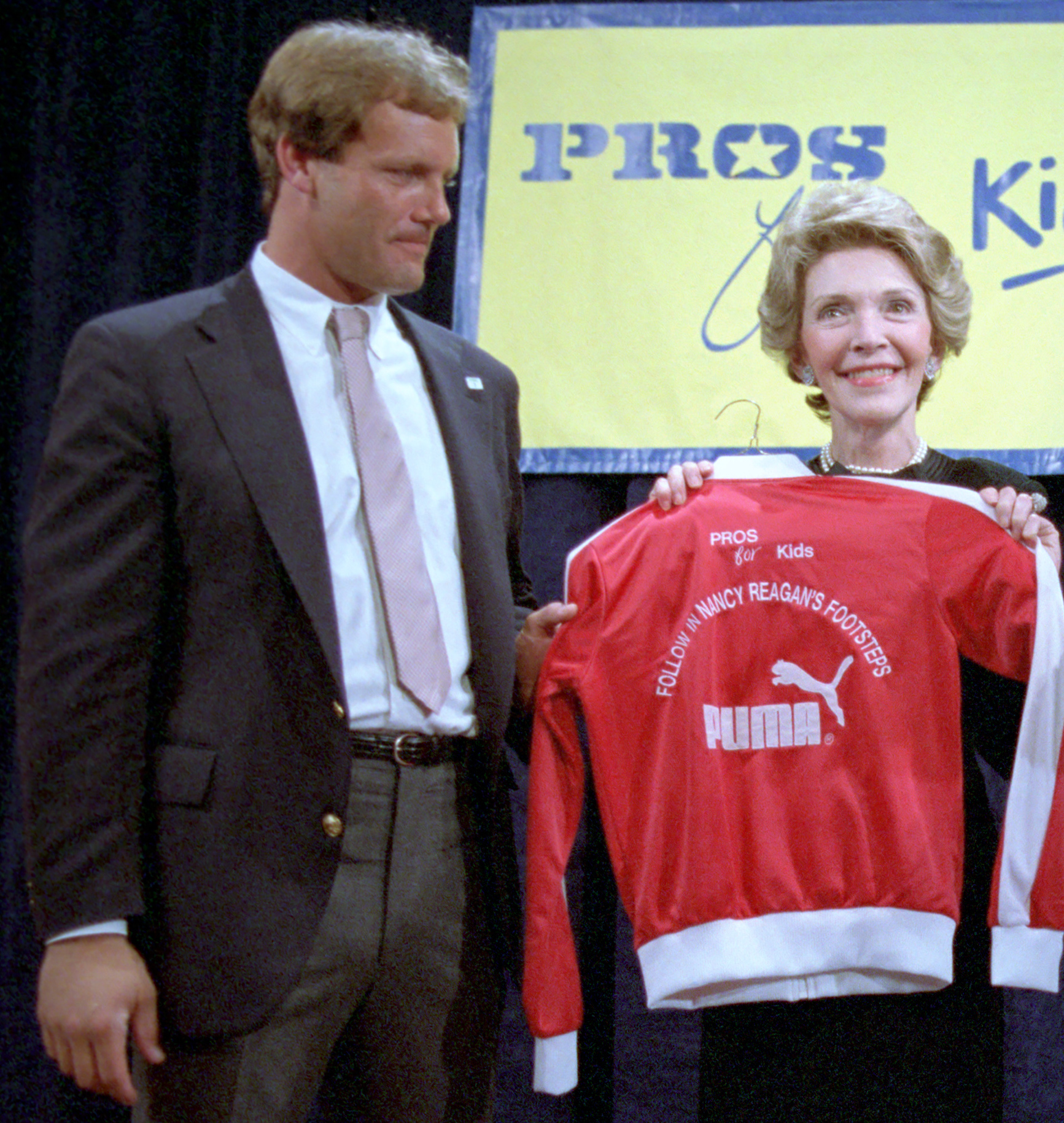
Brett with Nancy Reagan in 1985

In 1985, Brett had another brilliant season in which he helped propel the Royals to their second American League Championship. He batted .335 with 30 home runs and 112 RBI in 155 games, finishing in the top 10 of the league in 10 different offensive categories. Defensively, he won his only Gold Glove, which broke Buddy Bell's six-year run of the award, and finished second in American League MVP voting to Don Mattingly. In the final week of the regular season, he went 9-for-20 at the plate with seven runs, five homers, and 9 RBI in six crucial games, five of them victories, as the Royals closed the gap and won the division title at the end. He was MVP of the 1985 playoffs against the Toronto Blue Jays, with an incredible Game 3. With KC down in the series two games to none, Brett went 4-for-4, homering in his first two at bats against Doyle Alexander, and doubled to the same spot in right field in his third at bat, leading the Royals' comeback. Brett then batted .370 in the World Series against the St. Louis Cardinals, including a four-hit performance in Game 7. The Royals again rallied from a 3–1 deficit to become World Series champions for the first time in their history.

==== 1986–1993 ====
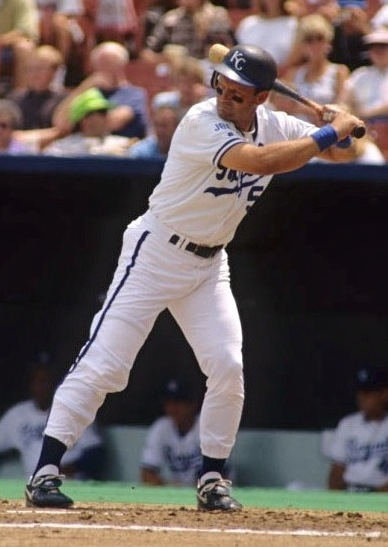
Brett batting in 1990

In 1988, Brett moved across the diamond to first base in an effort to reduce his chances of injury and had another top-notch season with a .306 average, 24 home runs and 103 RBI in 157 games. But after batting just .282 with 12 homers and 80 RBI in 124 games the next year, it looked like his career might be slowing down. He got off to a terrible start in 1990 and at one point even considered retirement. But his manager, former teammate John Wathan, encouraged him to stick it out. Finally, in July, the slump ended and Brett batted .386 for the rest of the season. In September, he caught Rickey Henderson for the league lead, and in a battle down to the last day of the season, captured his third batting title with a .329 mark. This feat made Brett the only major league player to win batting titles in three different decades.

Brett played three more seasons for the Royals, mostly as their designated hitter, but occasionally filling in for injured teammates at first base. He passed the 3,000-hit mark in 1992, though he was picked off by Angels pitcher Tim Fortugno while talking with first baseman Gary Gaetti. Brett retired after the 1993 season; in his final at-bat, he hit a single up the middle against Rangers closer Tom Henke and scored on a home run by now teammate Gaetti. His last game was also notable as being the final game ever played at Arlington Stadium.

== Hall of Fame ==
Brett was elected to the Hall of Fame in 1999, with what was then the fourth-highest voting percentage in baseball history (98.2%), trailing only Tom Seaver, Nolan Ryan, and Ty Cobb. His voting percentage was higher than all-time greats Babe Ruth, Hank Aaron, Willie Mays, Stan Musial, Ted Williams, and Joe DiMaggio. In 2007, Cal Ripken Jr. passed Brett with 98.5% of the vote.

Brett's No. 5 was retired by the Royals on May 14, 1994, only the second in Royals history, after former Royals manager, Dick Howser's No. 10 in 1987.

Brett was selected the Hometown Hero for the Royals in a two-month fan vote revealed in an hour-long telecast on ESPN on September 27, 2006. He was one of the few players to receive more than 400,000 votes.

== Legacy ==
George Brett's number 5 was retired by the Kansas City Royals in 1994.

Brett's 3,154 career hits are the second most by a third baseman in major league history, surpassed only by Adrián Beltré (3,166 hits), and 18th among all players. Baseball historian Bill James regards him as the second-best third baseman of all time, trailing only his contemporary, Mike Schmidt. In 1999, he ranked Number 55 on The Sporting News' list of the 100 Greatest Baseball Players, and was nominated as a finalist for the Major League Baseball All-Century Team. Brett is one of only five players in MLB history—the other four being Stan Musial, Willie Mays, Miguel Cabrera, and Hank Aaron—to accumulate 3,000 hits, 300 home runs, and a career .300 batting average. Most indicative of his hitting style, Brett is seventh on the career doubles list with 665, trailing only Tris Speaker, Pete Rose, Stan Musial, Ty Cobb, Albert Pujols and Craig Biggio).

Such pitchers as Dennis Eckersley and Ron Guidry have described Brett as the single toughest hitter they ever faced in their careers.

Brett was a highly effective hitter in the postseason. In 43 postseason games, including 2 World Series (1980, 1985), he batted .337 (56-for-166) with 10 home runs and 23 RBI.

A photo in the July 1976 edition of National Geographic showing Brett signing baseballs for fans with his team's name emblazoned across his shirt was the inspiration for New Zealand singer-songwriter Lorde's 2013 song "Royals," which won the 2014 Grammy Award for Song of the Year. Brett was inducted into the Missouri Sports Hall of Fame in 1994. Brett was inducted into the Kansas Sports Hall of Fame in 2017.

=== The Mendoza Line ===
Brett is credited with popularizing the phrase the Mendoza Line, which is used to represent a sub-.200 batting average, historically regarded as unacceptable at the Major League level. It derives from shortstop Mario Mendoza, a career .215 hitter who finished below .200 five times in his nine seasons in the big leagues—including .198 the year the term is claimed to have been coined by a pair of his teammates, Tom Paciorek and Bruce Bochte, in 1979.

Brett referred to the Mendoza Line in an interview, which was picked up by ESPN baseball anchor Chris Berman and then expanded into the world of SportsCenter.

== Post-baseball activities ==
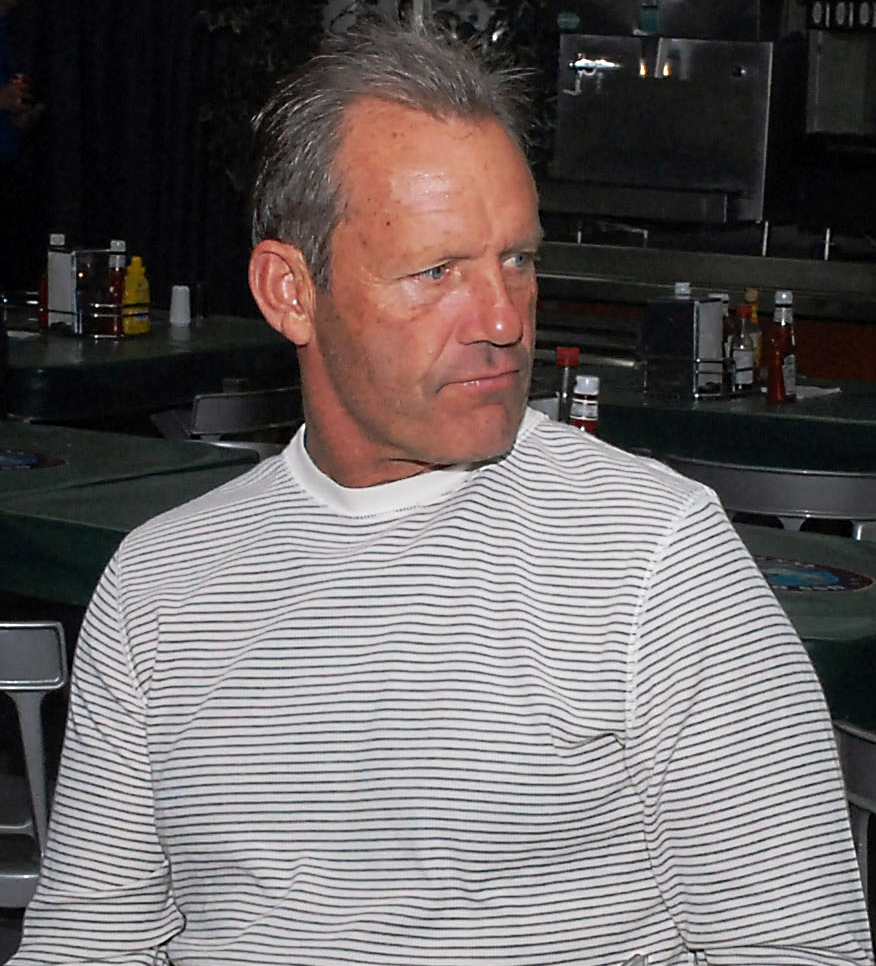
Brett in February 2009

Following his playing career Brett became a vice president of the Royals, and has worked as a part-time coach, as a special instructor in spring training, as an interim batting coach, and as a roving instructor helping minor league prospects develop. He also runs a baseball equipment and glove company named Brett Bros. with brothers Bobby, and, until his death in 2003, Ken. He has also lent his name to a restaurant on the Country Club Plaza in Kansas City, Missouri.

In 1998, Brett worked as a color analyst on regional Fox Saturday Baseball telecasts.

Brett has continued to raise money for amyotrophic lateral sclerosis (ALS), commonly known as Lou Gehrig's disease. Brett started to raise money for the Keith Worthington Chapter during his playing career in the mid-1980s.

Brett and his dog Charlie appeared in a PETA ad campaign, encouraging people not to leave their canine companions in the car during hot weather. He also threw out the ceremonial first pitch to Mike Napoli at the 2012 Major League Baseball All-Star Game.

On May 30, 2013, the Royals announced that Brett and Pedro Grifol would serve as batting coaches for the organization. On July 25, 2013 (the day following the 30th anniversary of the pine tar incident), the Royals announced that Brett would serve as vice president of baseball operations.

In 2015, Brett was the National Baseball Hall of Fame recipient of the Bob Feller Act of Valor Award for his support of current and former service members of the United States Military.

Brett appeared as himself in the ABC sitcom Modern Family on March 28, 2018, alongside main cast member Eric Stonestreet, a Kansas City native and Royals fan, whose character on the show is also an avid fan.

Brett appeared as himself in the Brockmire episode "Player to Be Named Later", in which he is dating Jules (Amanda Peet), much to Brockmire's despair; in the episode "Low and Away", Jules informs Brockmire that she and her now-husband Brett are getting a divorce. Series creator Joel Church-Cooper said, "When I created a show about a fake Kansas City legend, Jim Brockmire, I thought it only appropriate to have him worship the biggest Kansas City legend of them all—George Brett."

He was a recurring guest on the podcast Pardon My Take which is presented by Barstool Sports and hosted by Dan "Big Cat" Katz and PFT Commenter.

=== Team ownership ===
In 1998, an investor group headed by Brett and his older brother, Bobby, made an unsuccessful bid to purchase the Kansas City Royals. Brett is the principal owner of the Tri-City Dust Devils, the Single-A affiliate of the Los Angeles Angels. He and his brother Bobby also co-own the Rancho Cucamonga Quakes, a Los Angeles Dodgers Single-A partner, and lead ownership groups that control the Spokane Chiefs of the Western Hockey League, and the West Coast League's Bellingham Bells.

== Personal life ==
In 1992, Brett married the former Leslie Davenport, and they reside in the Kansas City suburb of Mission Hills, Kansas. The couple has three sons: Jackson, Dylan, and Robin.

== See also ==
- List of Major League Baseball players to hit for the cycle
- List of Major League Baseball annual doubles leaders
- List of Major League Baseball annual triples leaders
- List of Major League Baseball batting champions
- List of Major League Baseball career doubles leaders
- List of Major League Baseball career hits leaders
- List of Major League Baseball career home run leaders
- List of Major League Baseball career triples leaders
- List of Major League Baseball career runs batted in leaders
- List of Major League Baseball career runs scored leaders
- List of Major League Baseball career stolen bases leaders
- List of Major League Baseball career total bases leaders
- List of Major League Baseball doubles records
- List of Major League Baseball hit records
- List of Major League Baseball players who spent their entire career with one franchise

Preceded by Mike Cubbage; Gary Redus	Hitting for the cycle May 28, 1979; July 25, 1990	Succeeded by Dan Ford; Robby Thompson
