= U. L. Washington =

American baseball player (1953–2024)

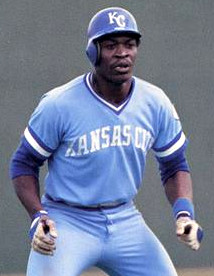
- Washington in 1980
- Shortstop
- Born: October 27, 1953; Stringtown, Oklahoma, U.S.
- Died: March 3, 2024 (aged 70); Atoka, Oklahoma, U.S.
- Batted: Switch Threw: Right

MLB debut
- September 6, 1977, for the Kansas City Royals

Last MLB appearance
- October 4, 1987, for the Pittsburgh Pirates

MLB statistics
- Batting average: .251
- Home runs: 27
- Runs batted in: 255
- Stats at Baseball Reference

Teams
- Kansas City Royals (1977–1984); Montreal Expos (1985); Pittsburgh Pirates (1986–1987)

U. L. Washington (October 27, 1953 – March 3, 2024) was an American professional baseball player and coach. He played in Major League Baseball (MLB) from 1977 to 1987 for the Kansas City Royals, Montreal Expos, and Pittsburgh Pirates. Washington played mostly as a shortstop during his career and was well known for having a toothpick in the corner of his mouth while on the field and at the plate.

== Early life ==
Washington was born in Stringtown, Oklahoma, one of 11 children born to Ora Lee and George Washington Jr. The U and L are Washington's legal given name and were not initials of other names.

Washington attended Stringtown High School, graduating in 1971. He attended nearby Murray State College and played college baseball for the Aggies for one season.

== Playing career ==
=== Kansas City Royals ===
After one year at Murray State, Washington joined the Kansas City Royals Baseball Academy after his older brother, James, convinced Royals general manager Lou Gorman to give him a tryout. Washington is one of only three MLB players, along with Ron Washington (no relation) and Frank White who are products of the Royals Academy.

Washington played for the Royals from 1977 through 1984. His best offensive season was 1982, when he batted .286 with 10 home runs and 60 RBIs – all career highs. Washington was on first base and scored on George Brett's "pine tar" home run in 1983. In eight seasons with the Royals, Washington hit .254 with 26 home runs and 228 RBIs. He was in four postseason series with the Royals — the 1980 American League Championship Series (ALCS) and World Series, 1981 American League Division Series, and 1984 ALCS — batting 12-for-43 (.279) in the playoffs.

=== Montreal Expos ===
In January 1985, the Royals traded Washington to the Montreal Expos for Mike Kinnunen and minor leaguer Ken Baker. Washington played in 68 games for the Expos as a utility infielder, batting .249 with one home run and 17 RBIs. In November 1985, he became a free agent.

=== Pittsburgh Pirates ===
Washington signed with the Pittsburgh Pirates in April 1986. During his two seasons with the Pirates, he appeared in a total of 82 games, batting .207 with no home runs and ten RBIs, again in a utility infielder role. He was released by the Pirates in October 1987. "I won't go back to the minors, but I haven't said I've officially retired. If someone called and said they wanted me to play in the majors I'd go. I spent nine straight years in the majors, so going back to the minors was the toughest thing for me the past two years. At my age it got to where every time out, I was fighting pain off here or there anyway. I really admire the guys who play until they're 40," Washington said early in the 1988 season.

=== Senior League ===
Washington played for the Orlando Juice of the Senior Professional Baseball Association in 1989.

== Post-playing career ==
In 1989, the Pittsburgh Pirates hired Washington as the manager of the Welland Pirates in the New York–Penn League. Washington also coached and managed in the minor league organizations of the Royals (1991–98), Los Angeles Dodgers (1999), Minnesota Twins (2001–02), and Boston Red Sox (2003–14). While coaching the Greenville Drive in 2013, Washington helped Mookie Betts change his swing to become more of a power hitter.

In 1992, while coaching the Memphis Chicks, Washington appeared in one game as a shortstop, going hitless in two at bats.

== Personal life ==
Washington and his wife, Sandra, had two children. He died on March 3, 2024, at age 70, after a battle with cancer, in Atoka, Oklahoma.

Washington regularly kept a toothpick in his mouth during games, a habit he developed in his youth as an alternative to chewing tobacco, which he disliked, and also in partial emulation of his father.“My father did the same thing. It’s just a habit,” he said. “But without it, I feel naked. People act like all this is strange, but I don’t think it’s strange at all.”
