= Dennis Leonard =

American baseball player (born 1951)

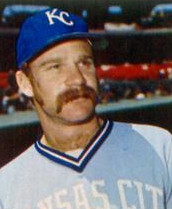
- Leonard, c. 1977
- Pitcher
- Born: May 8, 1951 (age 75); Brooklyn, New York, U.S.
- Batted: Right Threw: Right

MLB debut
- September 4, 1974, for the Kansas City Royals

Last MLB appearance
- September 27, 1986, for the Kansas City Royals

MLB statistics
- Win–loss record: 144–106
- Earned run average: 3.70
- Strikeouts: 1,323
- Stats at Baseball Reference

Teams
- Kansas City Royals (1974–1983, 1985–1986)

Career highlights and awards
- AL wins leader (1977); Kansas City Royals Hall of Fame

Dennis Patrick Leonard (born May 8, 1951) is an American former professional baseball pitcher who played for the Kansas City Royals of Major League Baseball from 1974 to 1986. He retired in 1986 due to injuries.

Born in Brooklyn, New York, Leonard attended Oceanside High School on Long Island, then played college baseball for and graduated from Iona College. He was drafted by the Royals in the second round of the 1972 draft and made his major league debut on September 4, 1974. In 1975, his first full year with the Royals, he achieved a 15–7 record.

Leonard later recorded three 20-win seasons, to become the only pitcher in Royals history to do so. He started nine post-season games for the Royals between 1976 and 1981, ending with a record of 3–5, including a 1–1 record in the 1980 World Series against the Philadelphia Phillies.

From 1975 to 1981, Leonard won 130 games, the most by any right-handed pitcher in Major League Baseball.

Leonard missed two months of the 1982 season, the majority of the 1983 season, and all of the 1984 and 1985 seasons due to hand and knee injuries. His final season was in 1986, where he ended up with an 8–13 record. Besides his rookie season of 1974, 1986 was his only season with a losing record.

Leonard finished his career as the Royals’ all-time leader in complete games (103) and shutouts (23), and was second in wins (144). He also held the club's single-season bests in starts (40), complete games (21), innings pitched (294.2) and strikeouts (244).

In 1989, Leonard was inducted into the Kansas City Royals Hall of Fame. After his playing career ended, he settled in the Kansas City area.

== See also ==
- List of Major League Baseball annual wins leaders
- List of Major League Baseball players who spent their entire career with one franchise
