= List of Chicago Cubs owners and executives =

This is a list of owners and executives of the Chicago Cubs.

== Owners ==
- Albert Spalding
- Jim Hart
- Charles Murphy
- Charles Phelps Taft
- Charles Weeghman
- Albert Lasker
- William Wrigley Jr.
- Philip K. Wrigley
- William Wrigley III
- Tribune Company
- The Ricketts Family

== General Managers ==
The Cubs have had 13 general managers. The general manager controls player transactions, hiring and firing of the coaching staff, and negotiates with players and agents regarding contracts. The first person to officially hold the title of general manager for the Cubs was Charles Weber, who assumed the title in 1934.

| # | Name | Seasons | Ref |
|---|---|---|---|
| 1 | Charles Weber | 1934–1940 | |
| 2 | James Gallagher | 1940–1949 | |
| 3 | Wid Matthews | February 1950 – October 1956 | |
| 4 | John Holland | October 1956 – September 1975 | |
| 5 | Salty Saltwell | September 1975 – November 1976 | |
| 6 | Bob Kennedy | November 1976 – May 1981 | |
| 7 | Herman Franks | May 1981 – October 1981 | |
| 8 | Dallas Green | October 1981 – October 1987 | |
| 9 | Jim Frey | November 1987 – October 1991 | |
| 10 | Larry Himes | November 1991 – October 1994 | |
| 11 | Ed Lynch | October 1994 – July 2000 | |
| 12 | Andy MacPhail | July 2000 – July 2002 | |
| 13 | Jim Hendry | July 2002 – August 2011 | |
| 14 | Randy Bush (interim) | August 2011 – October 2011 | |
| 15 | Jed Hoyer | November 2011 – October 2021 | |
| 16 | Carter Hawkins | October 2021 – present | |

== Presidents ==
- David Allen Gage
- Norman T. Gassette
- George W. Gage
- William Hulbert
- Albert Spalding
- Jim Hart
- Charles Murphy
- Charles H. Thomas
- Charles Weeghman
- Fred Mitchell
- William Veeck, Sr.
- Philip K. Wrigley
- William Wrigley III
- Bob Kennedy
- Bill Hagenah
- Andrew J. McKenna
- Jim Finks
- Dallas Green
- Donald Grenesko
- Andy MacPhail
- John McDonough
- Crane Kenney
- Theo Epstein
- Jed Hoyer
