= 1869 Chicago mayoral election =

- November 2, 1869
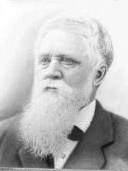

Nominee	Roswell B. Mason	George W. Gage
Party	Citizens Party	Republican
Popular vote	19,826	11,410
Percentage	63.47%	36.53%
Mayor before election
John B. Rice
Republican
Elected mayor
Roswell B. Mason
Citizens Party

In the Chicago mayoral election of 1869, Citizens Party nominee Roswell B. Mason defeated Republican nominee George W. Gage by a landslide 27-point margin.

This was the last mayoral election before the Great Chicago Fire took place.

Citizens Party candidate Mason was an executive in the Illinois Central Railroad. Republican Party candidate Gage was a businessman who operated the Tremont House and Sherman House hotels.

The Citizens Reform ticket was a nonpartisan reform slate which aimed to challenge the power of German Republican political boss Anton C. Hesing.

== Results ==
1869 Chicago mayoral election
Party	Candidate	Votes	%
Citizens Party	Roswell B. Mason	19,826	63.47
Republican	George W. Gage	11,410	36.53
Turnout		31,236	

== Aftermath ==
Mason would only serve a single term as mayor. Gage would go on to serve as the president of the Chicago White Stockings baseball team (today's Chicago Cubs) and serve as Chicago's South Parks Commissioner (during which time he commissioned a park which would subsequently bear his name).
