= Ira Couch =

American businessman (1806–1857)

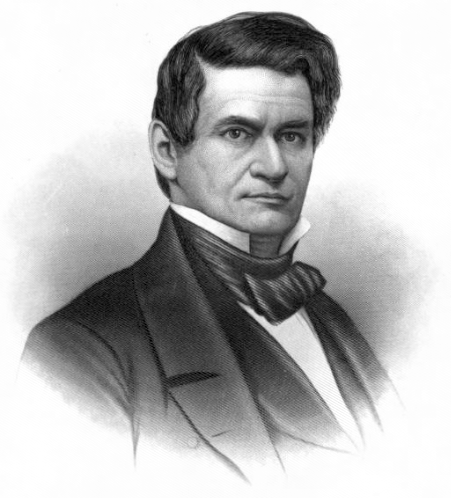
- Born: November 22, 1806; Saratoga County, New York
- Died: January 28, 1857 (aged 50) (Note: According to the "Ira's Daughter, Caroline" tab of the Hidden Truths page, his daughter gives his death date as January 28, 1857. Several unretracted newspaper articles from early-to-mid February report his death as having occurred "about two weeks ago", or with no date given. This casts doubt on the date of February 28, given on the family marker at Rosehill Cemetery.); Cuba
- Resting place: Lincoln Park in Chicago (formerly the location of City Cemetery)
- Occupation: Businessman

Signature
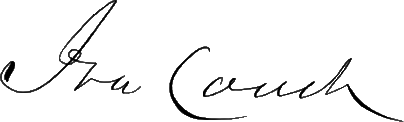

Ira Couch (November 22, 1806 – January 28, 1857) was an American businessman known for his real estate holdings in Chicago, as well as for establishing and running the city's Tremont House hotel.

Couch posthumously obtained two further claims to notability. The first is that a legal dispute over the remaining portions of his estate was the subject of an 1891 United States Supreme Court case. The second is that he is buried in what is now the last remaining marked grave in Chicago's Lincoln Park. The land occupied by Lincoln Park had been occupied by the City Cemetery at the time of Couch's interment, but had seen corpses from the other marked graves relocated elsewhere beginning in the 1860s.

== Life ==
Couch was born November 22, 1806, in Saratoga County, New York.

In 1836, Couch and his elder brother James settled in Chicago.

Couch worked as a tailor and haberdasher. He ran a shop with his brother on Lake Street where they sold furnishing and tailoring supplies, but they sold the business less than a year after starting it. They soon leased the rooming house where they had been staying, transforming it into the Tremont House hotel. It was located next door to their former business at the corner of Lake and Dearborn Streets. It became one of the earliest hotels in the city, and one of the city's most famous hotels of its day. The brothers would operate the hotel together. After the hotel was lost in a fire four years later, he opened a new building at the opposite side of the intersection. This new building was also lost to fire in 1849. After that, they reconstructed the hotel again, building what was the city's first grand hotel.

Couch became a millionaire through acquisitions of land and real estate he and his brother made across the city's core.

In 1853, Couch transferred the lease of the Tremont House to David Allen Gage and George W. Gage.

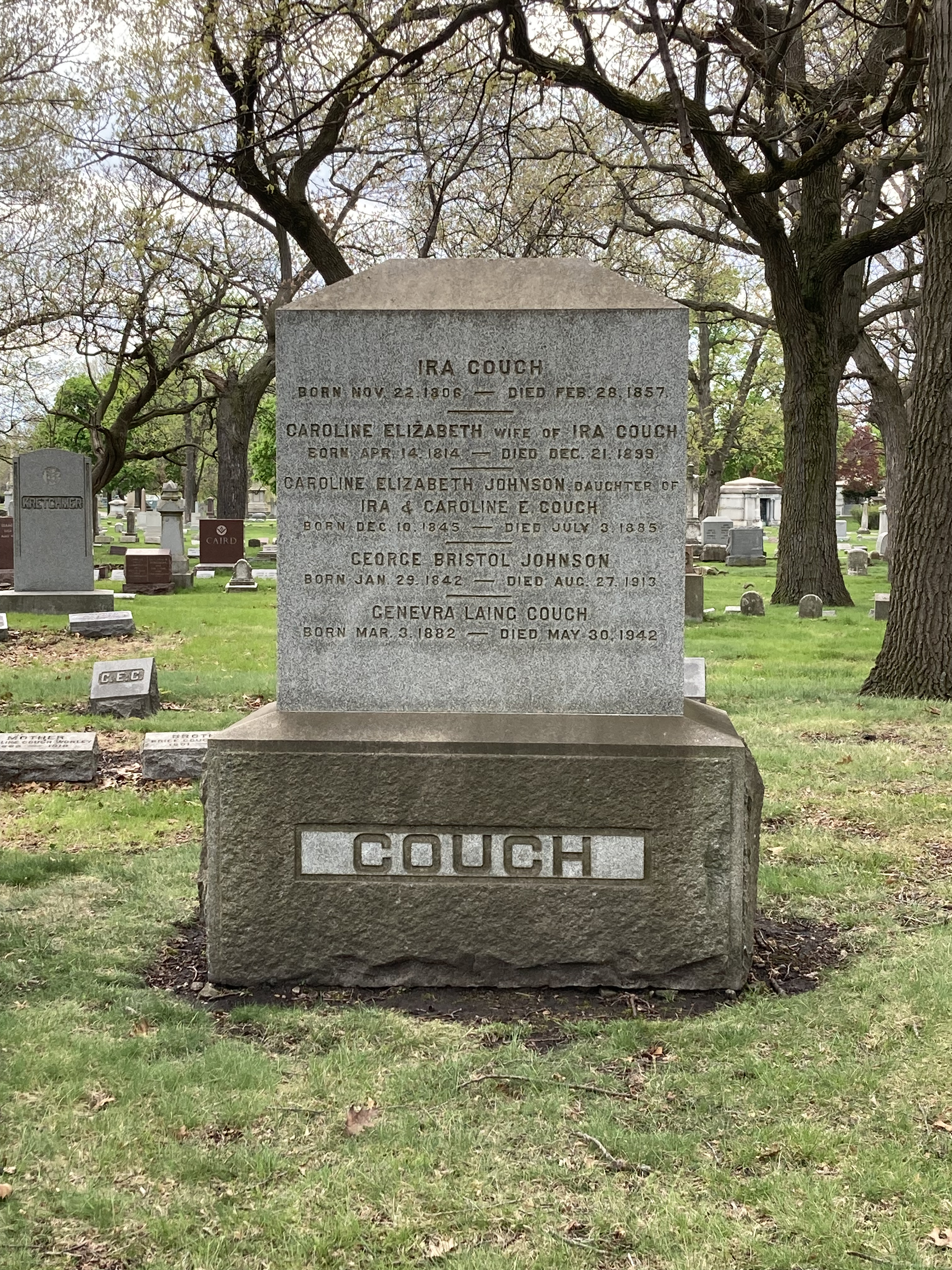
Family stone at Rosehill Cemetery, which bears Ira Couch's name but may be a cenotaph

Couch died at the age of 50 on January 28, 1857, during a winter stay with his family in Cuba. Couch had fallen suddenly ill shortly before his death. His corpse was shipped back to Chicago, arriving on March 4. His funeral was held on March 6.

At the time of his death, he was believed to be Chicago's third-wealthiest resident, after only William B. Ogden and John Wentworth.

== Legacy ==
The 1891 United States Supreme Court decision of Potter v. Couch pertained to his last will and testament, which was being litigated by family and other claimants seeking shares of the remainder of Couch's estate. Couch's brother James Couch named his son born in 1848 Ira. There is a street called Couch Place in the Chicago Loop, which divides the exact city block that the Tremont House once stood on. The Nederlander Theatre is on the south side of the alley.

=== Tomb ===
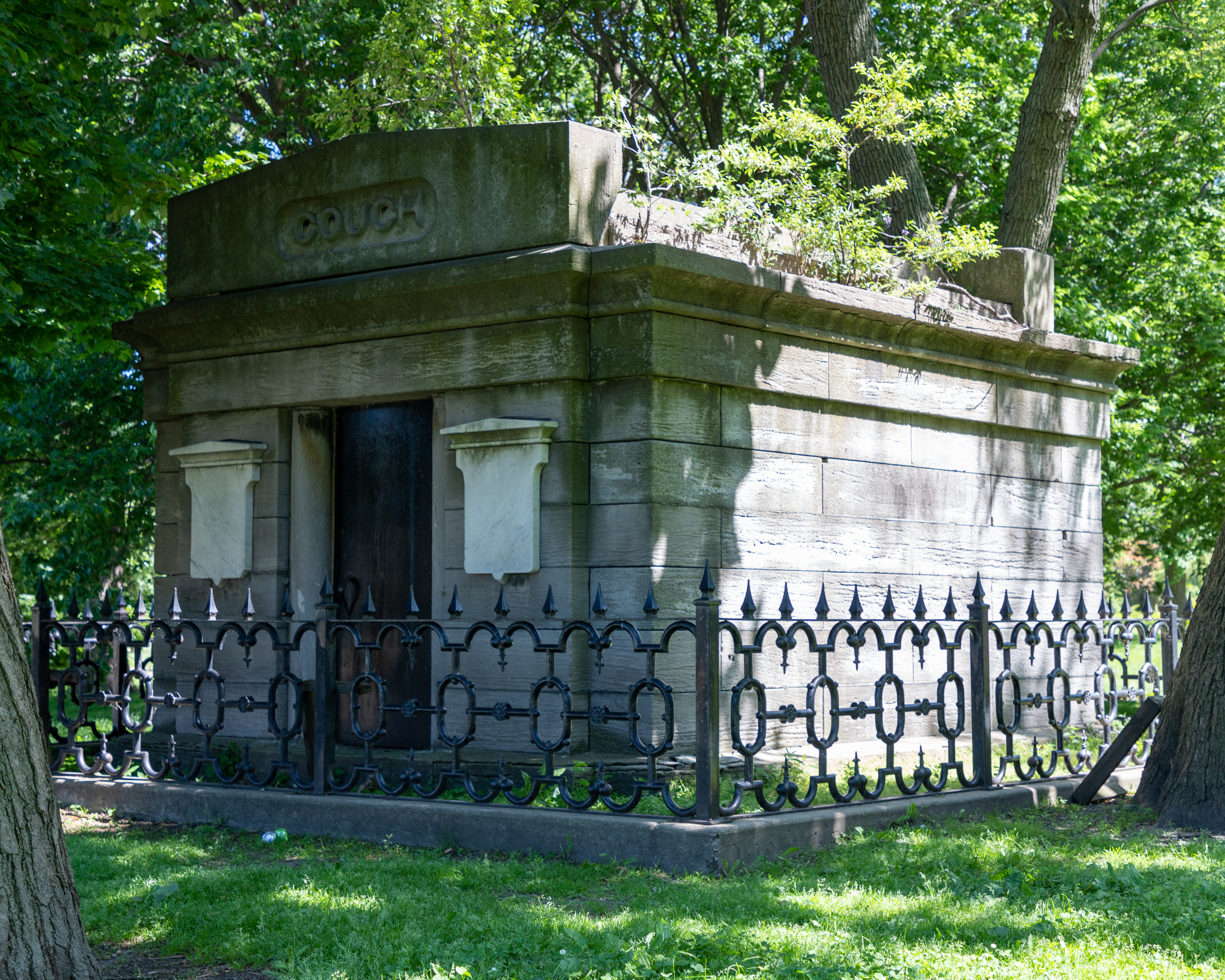
Couch's mausoleum

After Couch's death, his family built a mausoleum in Chicago's City Cemetery. He was entombed in it eighteen months after his death, making it his final resting place. The mausoleum was designed by John M. Van Osdel, who had also designed the grand reconstruction of the Tremont House. Its construction attracted great attention. Beginning in the 1860s, the city began relocating corpses from the cemetery and reinterring them elsewhere, and the land was transformed into Lincoln Park. Today, Couch's tomb is the only remaining marked grave in the land that was once occupied the City Cemetery. The tomb is located near the Chicago History Museum building.
