= Theo-logy =

Theo-logy: How a Boy Wonder Led the Red Sox to the Promised Land is a biography of Boston Red Sox general manager Theo Epstein, written by sportswriter John Frascella, published March 25, 2009. Frascella currently writes for both FanSided and Razzball.

Theo-logy is the first book chronicling the life and professional career of Epstein, who was the Red Sox's GM on and off from 2003 through 2011. Voros McCracken (former special consultant to baseball operations), a quoted source in the book, said that Epstein was also running the team in 2002. The GM at the time was Mike Port, who is now a member of the Umpires Association.

Theo-logy: How a Boy Wonder Led the Red Sox to the Promised Land gives readers insight into Epstein's managerial techniques and strategies. His cutting-edge philosophies led the Red Sox to long-desired World Series victories.

Epstein later went on to become the President of Baseball Operations for the Chicago Cubs. He delivered a World Series to Chicago as well.

Theo-logy was the first deep-dive into his life and professional career.

== Sources ==
- https://fansided.com/author/jfrascella/
- https://football.razzball.com/author/johnfrascella
- https://www.amazon.com/Theology-Wonder-Promised-Frascella-2009-03-25/dp/B01K3PYZES
- https://www.bostonherald.com/2022/04/06/from-the-archives-red-sox-win-2004-world-series/
- https://elitesportsny.com/2017/03/23/chicago-cubs-president-theo-epstein-named-worlds-greatest-leader-by-fortune-magazine/
