= Julian Mason =

Julian Mason may refer to:

- Julian Martrel Mason (born 1992), known by the pseudonym LilJuMadeDaBeat, American record producer and songwriter
- Julian S. Mason (c.1876–1954), American newspaper editor and writer
