= Theo Epstein =

American baseball executive

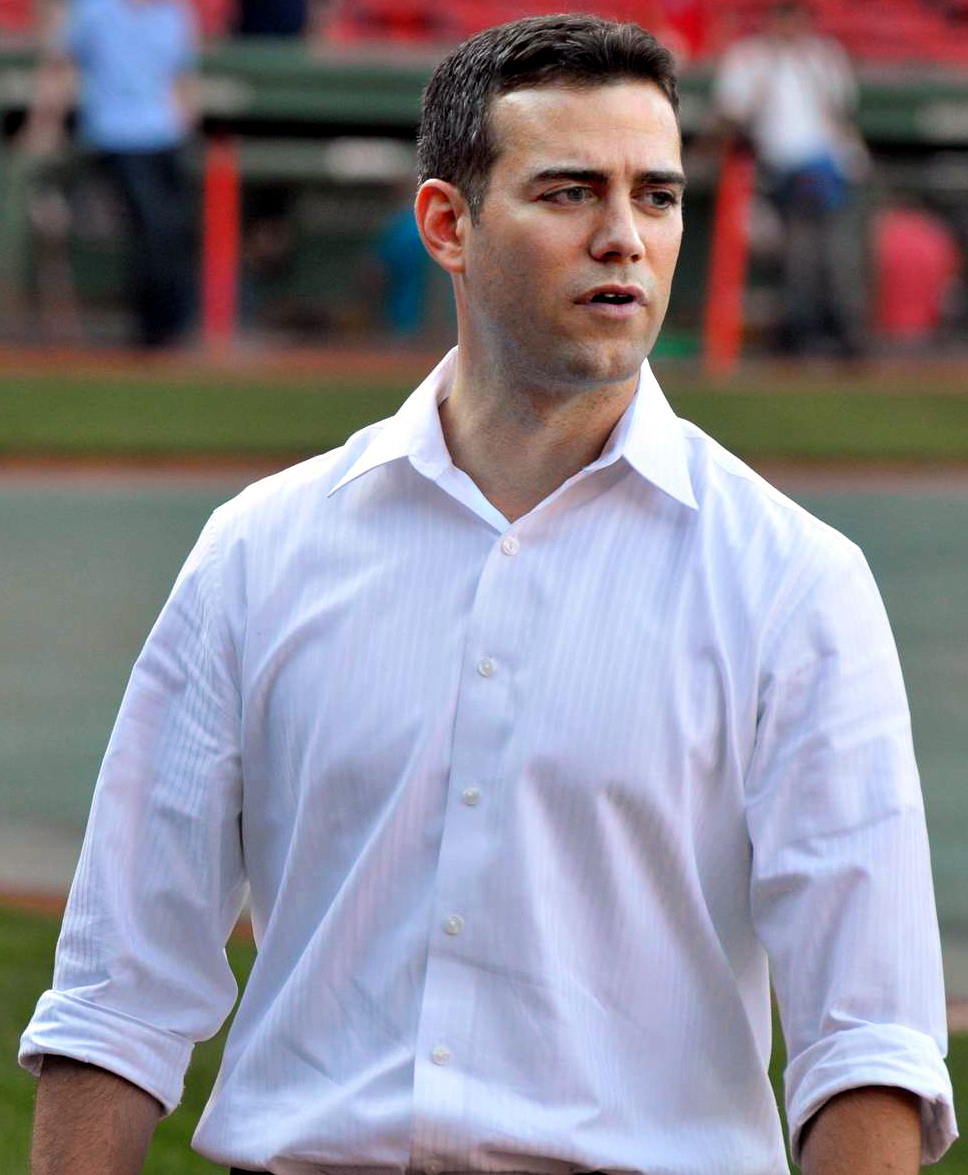
- Epstein in 2010
- General manager
- Born: December 29, 1973 (age 52); New York City, U.S.

Teams
- As executive: San Diego Padres (1997–2001) Director of baseball operations; Boston Red Sox (2002–2005) General manager; Boston Red Sox (2006–2011) Executive vice president and general manager; Chicago Cubs (2012–2020) President of baseball operations

Career highlights and awards
- 3× World Series champion (2004, 2007, 2016); Baseball America Major League Executive of the Year (2008); The Sporting News Executive of the Year (2016)

Theo Nathaniel Epstein (born December 29, 1973) is an American former Major League Baseball (MLB) executive who currently serves as a senior advisor and part-owner of Fenway Sports Group, which owns the Boston Red Sox of MLB and Liverpool F.C. of the English Premier League, among other properties.

Epstein helped to end two of the longest World Series droughts in MLB history. In 2004, when he was vice president and general manager for the Red Sox, the team won their first World Series championship in 86 years. His next job was president of baseball operations for the Chicago Cubs, who in 2016 won their first World Series championship in 108 years. After his tenure in Chicago, he joined MLB as a consultant.

== Early life ==
Epstein was born to a secular Jewish family in New York City and raised in Brookline, Massachusetts. He graduated from Brookline High School in 1991, where he played baseball for the Brookline High School Warriors, but dreamed of working for the Red Sox.

Epstein attended Yale University, where he lived at Jonathan Edwards College. He served as sports editor of the Yale Daily News. He graduated in 1995 with a degree in American studies. During his time as an undergraduate, he wrote letters to several teams expressing interest in working for them. His letter to the Baltimore Orioles reached team executive Calvin Hill, a Yale alumnus and head of personnel, who invited him for an interview. Epstein interned for three consecutive summers for the Orioles. Eventually he was hired as the public relations assistant for the Orioles.

== Career ==
=== San Diego Padres ===
Epstein then moved with Larry Lucchino to the San Diego Padres as director of player development. While working for the Padres, he also studied at the University of San Diego School of Law and earned a Juris Doctor degree at Lucchino's suggestion. Epstein based his class selection on which professors seemed to be the most lenient with attendance policies given the Padres' often-late work hours. By studying law, Epstein was invited to take part in high-level negotiations and discussions by then-GM Kevin Towers since few in the Padres' small operations division had a legal background to understand contract language. He worked his way up to become the team's director of baseball operations.

=== Boston Red Sox ===
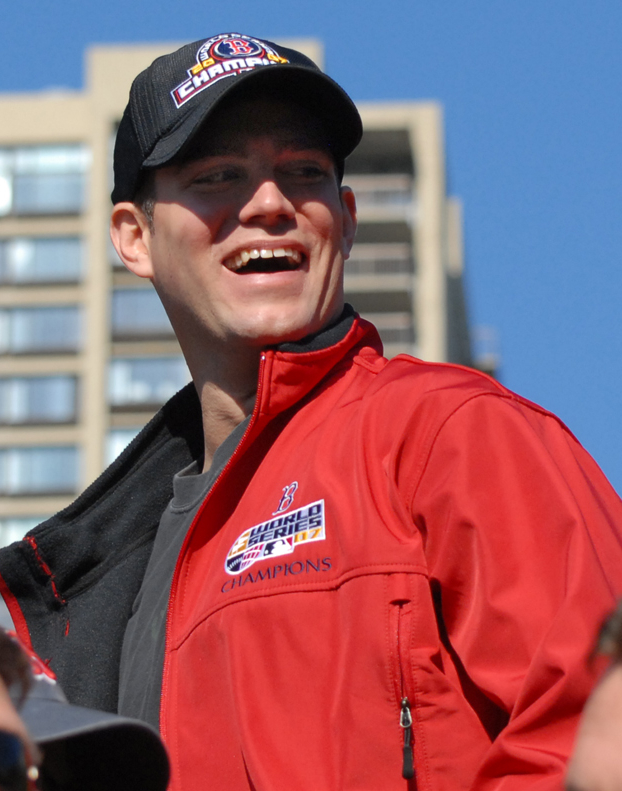
Epstein at the 2007 World Series victory parade

After leaving the position as the Padres' President, Lucchino became president and chief executive officer (CEO) of the Red Sox on February 27, 2002 and hired Epstein to work under him. At the end of the 2002 season, Lucchino appointed Epstein to replace interim general manager (GM) Mike Port. Epstein is credited with trading away Nomar Garciaparra and acquiring Bill Mueller and Curt Schilling, moves that helped break the "Curse of the Bambino" when the Red Sox defeated the St. Louis Cardinals in the 2004 World Series, their first championship since 1918.

On October 31, 2005, he resigned, rejecting a three-year, $1.5-million-per-year contract for personal reasons. According to The Boston Globe, "This is a job you have to give your whole heart and soul to", he said. "In the end, after a long period of reflection about myself and the program, I decided I could no longer put my whole heart and soul into it." As it was Halloween the night he resigned from the Red Sox, he left Fenway Park wearing a gorilla suit in an attempt to avoid reporters. A witness reported spotting a person wearing a gorilla suit driving a Volvo similar to Epstein's that night. The suit was loaned to him and was later auctioned for $11,000. The money raised was given to The Jimmy Fund and the Foundation to be Named Later (FTBNL).

Epstein remained in contact with the team's front office and in January 2006, he and Red Sox management announced he would return, resuming the role of general manager and adding the title of executive vice president. The Red Sox went on to win the 2007 World Series, Epstein's second championship with Boston. In November 2007, Epstein announced, at the annual general manager meeting, that he had signed a new contract with the Red Sox but declined to disclose the terms of the deal.

=== Chicago Cubs ===
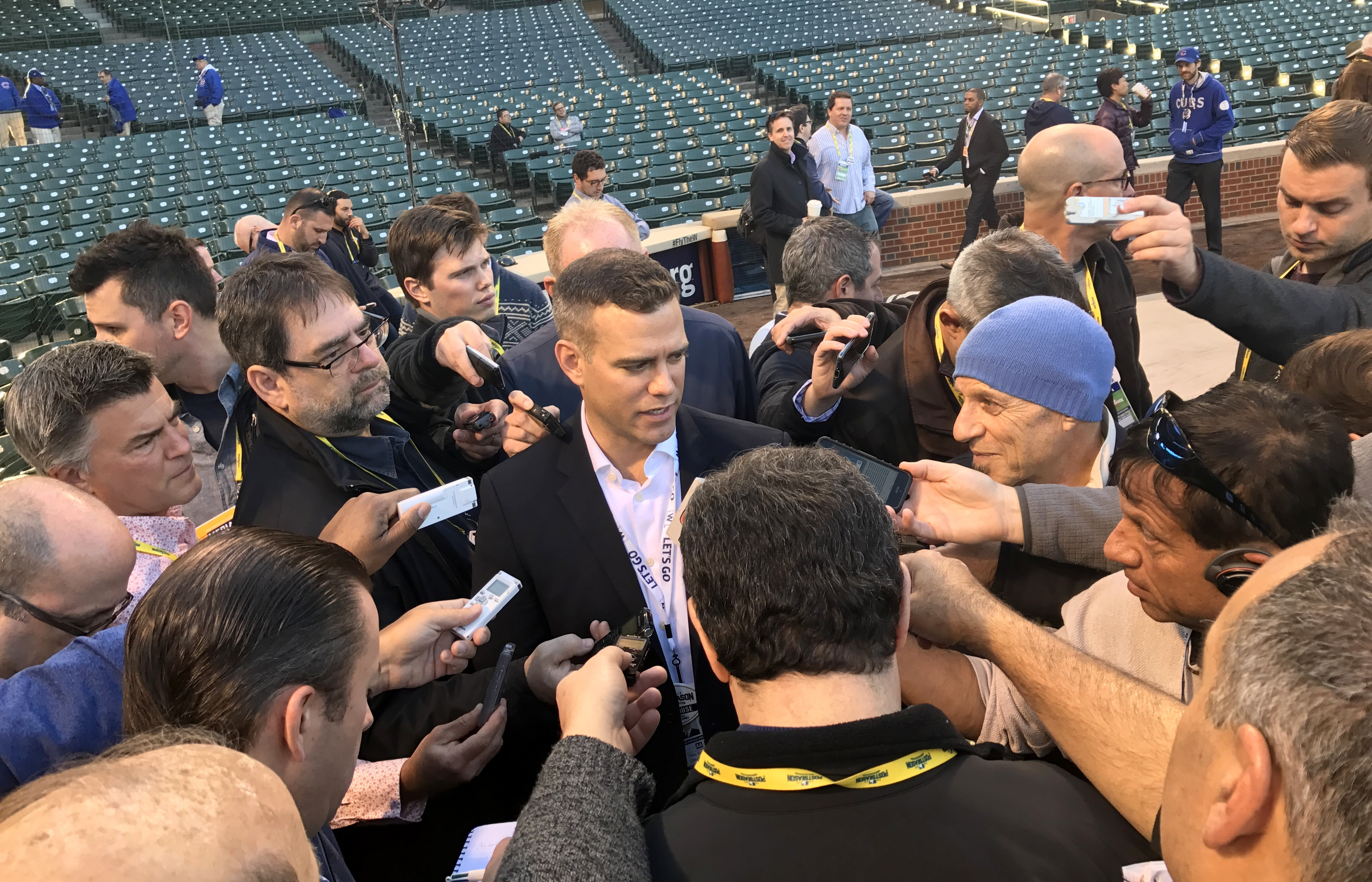
Epstein talks to reporters before the 2016 NLCS Game 6

On October 12, 2011, Epstein agreed to a five-year contract worth $18.5 million with the Chicago Cubs. On October 19, 2011, it was reported that Epstein's official title with the Cubs would be president and that San Diego Padres general manager Jed Hoyer would take the GM position with the Cubs.

On October 23, 2011, he took out a full-page ad in The Boston Globe, thanking Red Sox fans and the team's owners for their support. Two days later, the Cubs officially introduced Epstein as president of baseball operations. The Cubs finished in last place in the National League Central for the first three years of Epstein's presidency, as the focus was to acquire young talent rather than maximize short-term competitiveness. After a three-year rebuild, the Cubs clinched a playoff berth in 2015 and advanced to the National League Championship Series, where they were swept by the New York Mets.

Epstein signed an extension with the club on September 28, 2016, with a contract estimated to be worth up to $25 million. The Cubs would proceed to break the so-called "Curse of the Billy Goat" by defeating Cleveland Indians in the 2016 World Series, their first championship since 1908.

Epstein stepped down from his role on the Cubs on November 20, 2020. Jed Hoyer, Epstein's long-time deputy, took over his position.

=== MLB consultant and private equity ===
In January 2021, MLB hired Epstein as a consultant for "on-field matters". Later that year, he joined private equity firm Arctos Partners.

=== Return to Fenway Sports Group ===
On February 2, 2024, Fenway Sports Group announced that Epstein would return to the company as a senior adviser, while also joining its ownership group pending MLB approval.

== Personal life ==
Epstein has a twin brother, Paul, who is a social worker at Brookline High School in Brookline, Massachusetts. He and Paul are co-founders of "The Foundation to be Named Later", established in 2005.

Epstein's grandfather, Philip G. Epstein, and great-uncle, Julius J. Epstein – with Howard E. Koch – won Academy Awards for the screenplay of Casablanca, while his father, novelist Leslie Epstein, headed the Creative Writing Program at Boston University. His mother, Ilene (Gradman), opened a clothing store. Epstein's sister, Anya, is a screenwriter and television producer (Homicide: Life on the Street and Tell Me You Love Me).

In 2007, Epstein married Marie Whitney, a Catholic and the founder/creative director of Two Penny Blue. The couple have two sons. Boston Globe sportswriter Gordon Edes reported that the wedding took place at Nathan's Famous hot dog stand at Coney Island, then later published a correction, noting that he had fallen for a prank by Theo's father Leslie. The site and actual date of the wedding were never released, but the Boston Herald later reported that the wedding took place on Red Sox owner John Henry's yacht in Saint Thomas.

=== Charity ===
Epstein's "Hot Stove Cool Music" are biannual Boston and Chicago benefit concerts that have raised millions of dollars for the "disadvantaged youth and families" of the respective cities. Before the 2015 event, Epstein said, "We've collectively raised more than $6 million and look forward to increasing that total this year through another great night of music, baseball and giving back."

== Honors and awards ==
As a front office executive, Epstein is a three-time World Series champion, winning twice with the Red Sox (2004 and 2007) and once with the Cubs (2016). In 2007, the United States Sports Academy named Epstein the recipient of its "Carl Maddox Sport Management Award".

In December 2008, Baseball America named Epstein its Baseball America Major League Executive of the Year.

In March 2009, the book Theo-logy: How a Boy Wonder Led the Red Sox to the Promised Land was published.

In September 2009, Epstein was named Sporting News Executive of the Decade. At the same time, the Red Sox were named Sporting News Team of the Decade. In December, Sports Illustrated named him MLB's Best General Manager of the Decade and number 3 on its list of the Top 10 GMs/Executives of the Decade (in all sports).

In November 2016, Epstein was named the Sporting News Executive of the Year. Also in November, Epstein won the Esurance MLB Award for Best Executive.

In March 2017, Epstein was announced as Yale's Class Day Speaker. Fortune Magazine also ranked Epstein #1 in their 2017 list of the "World's Greatest Leaders".

In April 2017, Time Magazine named Epstein one of the world's 100 most influential people.

== Record as general manager/president of baseball operations ==
Team	Year	Regular season					Postseason			
Team	Year	Games	Won	Lost	Win %	Finish	Won	Lost	Win %	Result
BOS	2003	162	95	67	.586	2nd in AL East	6	6	.500	Lost ALCS (NYY)
BOS	2004	162	98	64	.605	2nd in AL East	11	3	.786	Won World Series (STL)
BOS	2005	162	95	67	.586	2nd in AL East	0	3	.000	Lost ALDS (CHW)
BOS	2006	162	86	76	.531	3rd in AL East	–	–	–	–
BOS	2007	162	96	66	.593	1st in AL East	11	3	.786	Won World Series (COL)
BOS	2008	162	95	67	.586	2nd in AL East	6	5	.545	Lost ALCS (TB)
BOS	2009	162	95	67	.586	2nd in AL East	0	3	.000	Lost ALDS (LAA)
BOS	2010	162	89	73	.549	3rd in AL East	–	–	–	–
BOS	2011	162	90	72	.556	3rd in AL East	–	–	–	–
BOS total		1,458	839	619	.575		34	23	.596	
CHC	2012	162	61	101	.377	5th in NL Central	–	–	–	–
CHC	2013	162	66	96	.407	5th in NL Central	–	–	–	–
CHC	2014	162	73	89	.451	5th in NL Central	–	–	–	–
CHC	2015	162	97	65	.599	3rd in NL Central	4	5	.444	Lost NLCS (NYM)
CHC	2016	162	103	58	.640	1st in NL Central	11	6	.647	Won World Series (CLE)
CHC	2017	162	92	70	.568	1st in NL Central	4	6	.400	Lost NLCS (LAD)
CHC	2018	163	95	68	.583	2nd in NL Central	0	1	.000	Lost NLWC (COL)
CHC	2019	162	84	78	.519	3rd in NL Central	–	–	–	–
CHC	2020	60	34	26	.567	1st in NL Central	0	2	.000	Lost NLWC (MIA)
CHC total		1,357	705	651	.520		19	20	.487	
Total		2,815	1,544	1,270	.549		53	43	.552	

Sporting positions
Preceded by Mike Port (internim general manager)	General Manager for the Boston Red Sox; 2002 – 2011	Succeeded by Ben Cherington
Preceded by Crane Kenney	President of Baseball Operations for the Chicago Cubs; 2011 – 2020	Succeeded by Jed Hoyer
