= Dan O'Brien (baseball executive) =

American baseball executive

Dan O'Brien Jr.
- Born: 1953 or 1954 (age 71–72)
- Education: Rollins College; Ohio University
- Occupation: Baseball executive
- Known for: 16th general manager of the Cincinnati Reds
- Father: Dan O'Brien Sr.

Daniel F. O'Brien Jr. (born 1953 or 1954) is an American baseball executive who served as general manager of the Cincinnati Reds of Major League Baseball (MLB) from October 2003 to January 2006.

== Biography ==
O'Brien began his career in the Seattle Mariners front office in 1977 (the team's inaugural season), then switched to the Houston Astros in 1982, serving first as the team's farm system director and then its scouting director through 1996. He was assistant general manager of the Texas Rangers from 1997 through 2003.

O'Brien was hired as the general manager of the Cincinnati Reds on October 27, 2003, succeeding Jim Bowden. He was fired by new Reds ownership on January 23, 2006. He then served as a special assistant to Milwaukee Brewers GM Doug Melvin from 2006 to 2013.

O'Brien earned degrees at Rollins College and Ohio University. His father, Dan O'Brien Sr., was the general manager of three teams in the American League West division from 1974 through 1993: the Rangers, Mariners (where he also was club president), and the California Angels.

Preceded by Jim Bowden	Cincinnati Reds general manager 2003–2006	Succeeded by Wayne Krivsky
