= Julian S. Mason =

American newspaper editor and writer

Julian S. Mason (c.1876–1954) was a newspaper editor and writer.

== Early life, family background, education ==
Mason was born in Chicago, Illinois. He was a son of lawyer and historian Edward G. Mason and his wife Julia Mason (née Starkweather). He was one of ten sons (and thirteen children) the two had together. Mason's paternal grandfather was Roswell B. Mason, who served as the mayor of Chicago.

Mason graduated from Yale University in 1898. Mason's father was both an alumnus and a trustee of the university, and many of his siblings similarly graduated from the university.

== Newspaper editing career ==
After graduating university, Mason began a career in Chicago's newspaper industry. He began working at the Chicago Record-Herald in 1902. After a brief stint working at the Chicago Tribune, he began working at the Chicago Evening Post. He was the Evening Post's managing editor from 1916 until 1922.

In 1922, Mason left Chicago to take a job in New York City as the managing editor of the New-York Tribune. He continued as editor after it became the New York Herald Tribune following a 1924 merger with The New York Herald. He left in 1926 to become the editor in chief of the New York Evening Post, holding this role until 1933 when the newspaper was sold to J. David Stern.

== Later political and writing careers ==
After leaving the New York Evening Herald, Mason became engaged for a number of years in politics. He served as the vice president of the National Republican Builders, an organization which sought to revitalize the Republican Party following its landslide defeat in the 1932 elections.

For much of the years 1934 and 1935, Mason authored a series of weekly articles published in the Herald Tribune which attacked the New Deal.

Mason wrote magazine articles for publications such as The Saturday Evening Post, Newsweek, Liberty. Mason also worked as a publicist.

Mason was a member of the Author's League Fund and the Dutch Treat Club.

== Personal life ==
In 1908, Mason wed Florence Grey. The two had a son and daughter Grey Mason and Barbara Terry (née Mason; wife of insurance broker H.P. Baldwin Terry).

Mason's son followed him into the newspaper industry, serving as the editor of Lloyd C. Griscom's multiple Long Island newspapers.

In his later years, Mason resided in Old Brookville, New York on Long Island. He died November 8, 1954, while at his home in Old Brookville. His death was sudden, coming after only a brief illness. He was survived by his widow and his children. His family had his remains cremated, and held a memorial service at the chapel of Graceland Cemetery in Chicago.

The year after Mason's death, his son married Anne Miller, granddaughter of the late U.S. Senator Edward Murphy Jr.
