= Grand Pacific Hotel (Chicago) =

Hotel in Chicago, Illinois

Coordinates: 41.8786°N 87.6315°W

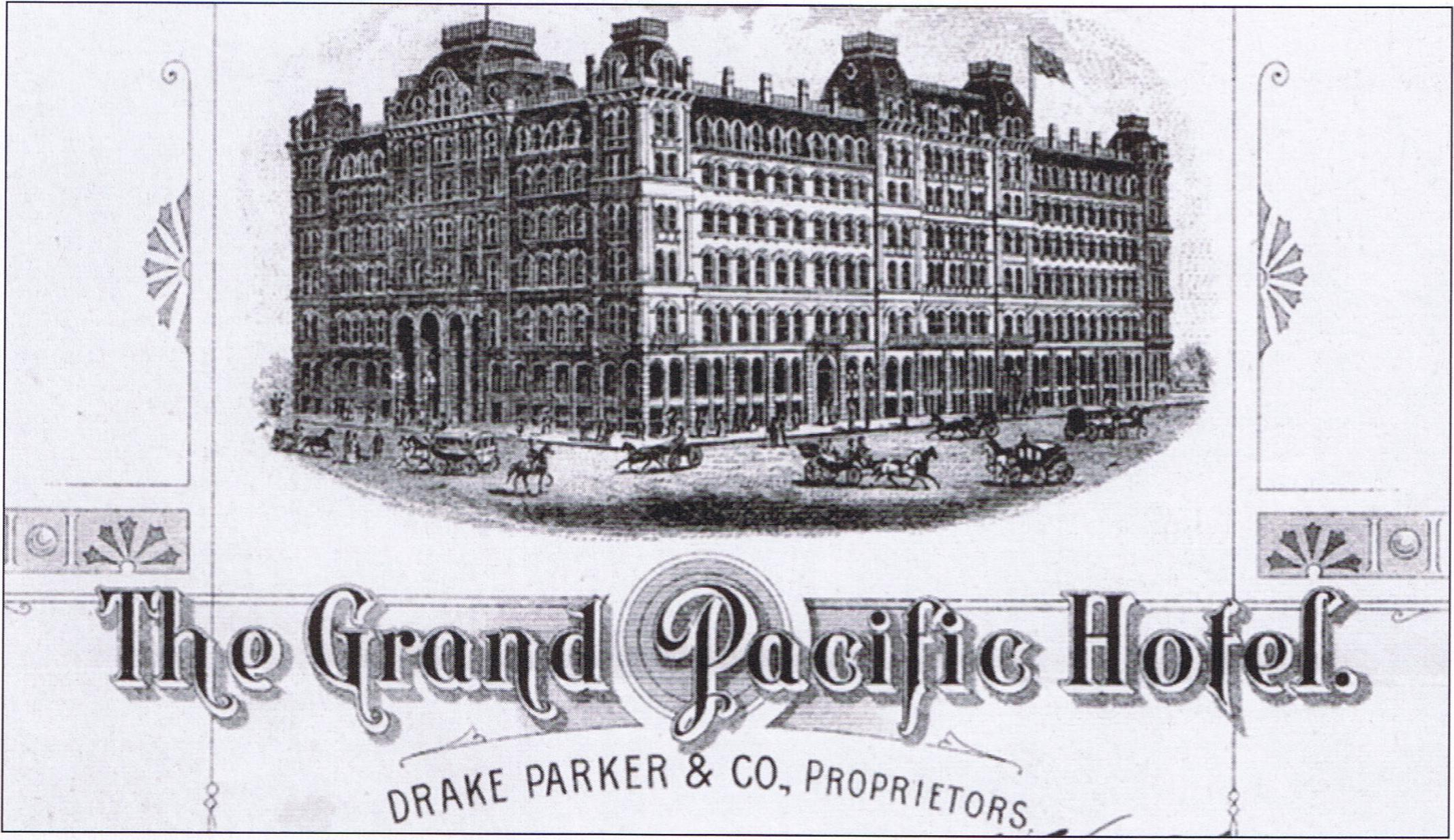
- Interactive map of the Grand Pacific Hotel (Chicago) area

General information
- Opened: 1873
- Demolished: 1895 (partial demolition); 1925 (complete demolition)

The Grand Pacific Hotel was one of the first two prominent hotels built in Chicago, Illinois, after the Great Chicago Fire. The hotel, designed by William W. Boyington and managed for more than 20 years by John Drake, was located on the block bounded by Clark Street, LaSalle, Quincy and Jackson. It was a replacement for the Pacific Hotel, which had been built in 1871 (also designed by Boyington), only to burn in the fire later that year.

Drake hosted "Great Game Dinners" featuring exotic cuisines at this hotel. These dinners were a Chicago social institution for more than 50 years. Newspapers devoted 4 inches to its menu and guests.

Along with contemporary Chicago luxury hotels such as the Palmer House, Tremont House, and Sherman House, it was built in the palazzo architectural style of the day. The hotel also accommodated wealthy permanent residents in addition to transient guests who enjoyed the palace hotel.

Many notable celebrities stayed here, including Oscar Wilde on his first visit to Chicago as part of his 1882 lecture tour of America. James A. Garfield stayed at the hotel during the 1880 Republican National Convention, during which time he was nominated on the 36th ballot to represent the party in the election for President of the United States. The hotel was the site where Standard time was adopted on October 11, 1883.

The western half of the 1873 structure was demolished in 1895 in order to make way for the Illinois Trust and Savings Bank building. The remaining eastern half was remodeled by the architectural firm Jenney and Mundie. It reopened March 12, 1898, with 188 rooms, and remained open until 1921. In 1921, it was demolished to make way for the Continental Illinois Bank building.

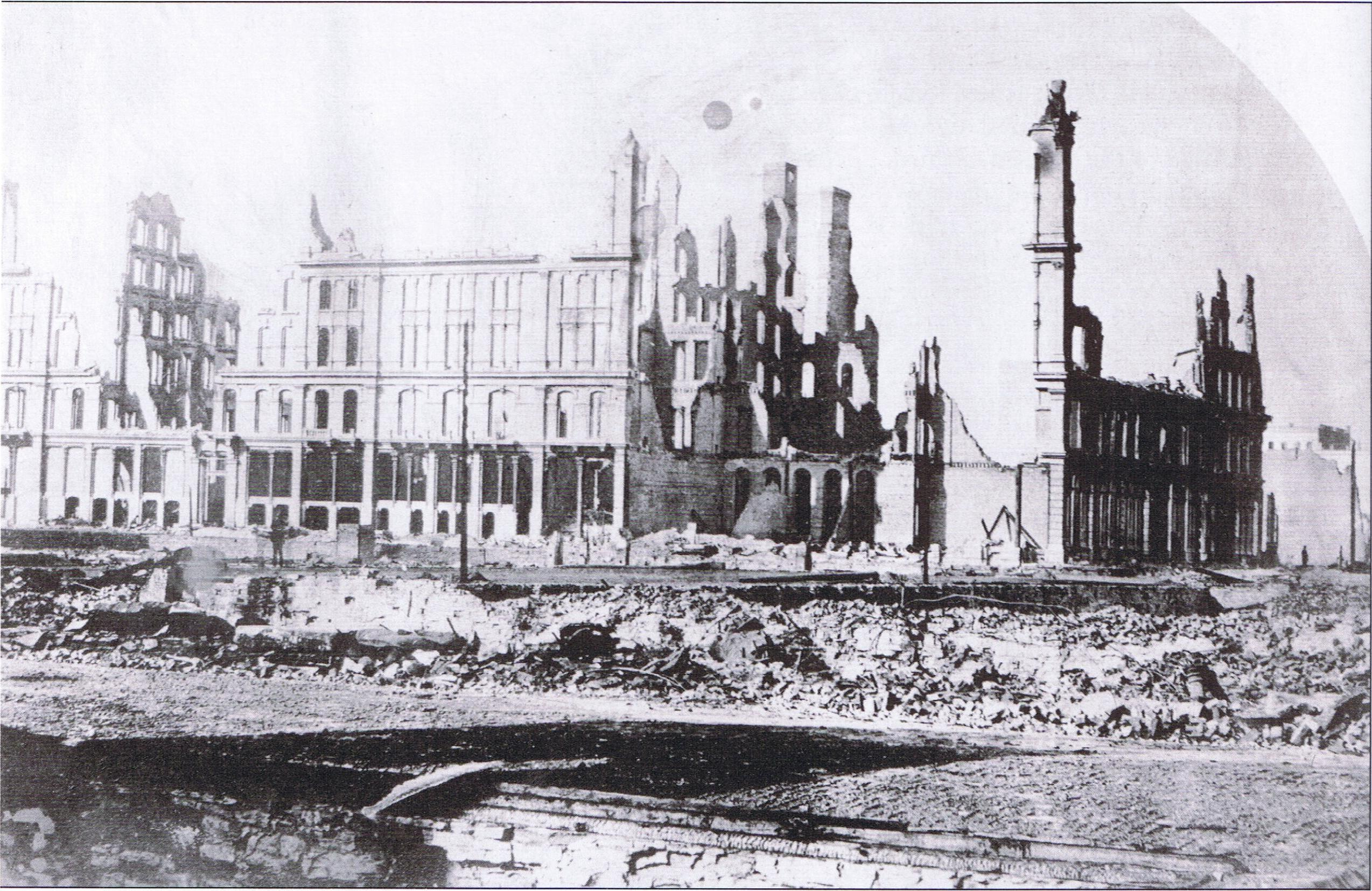
The preceding Pacific Hotel after the 1871 Great Chicago Fire

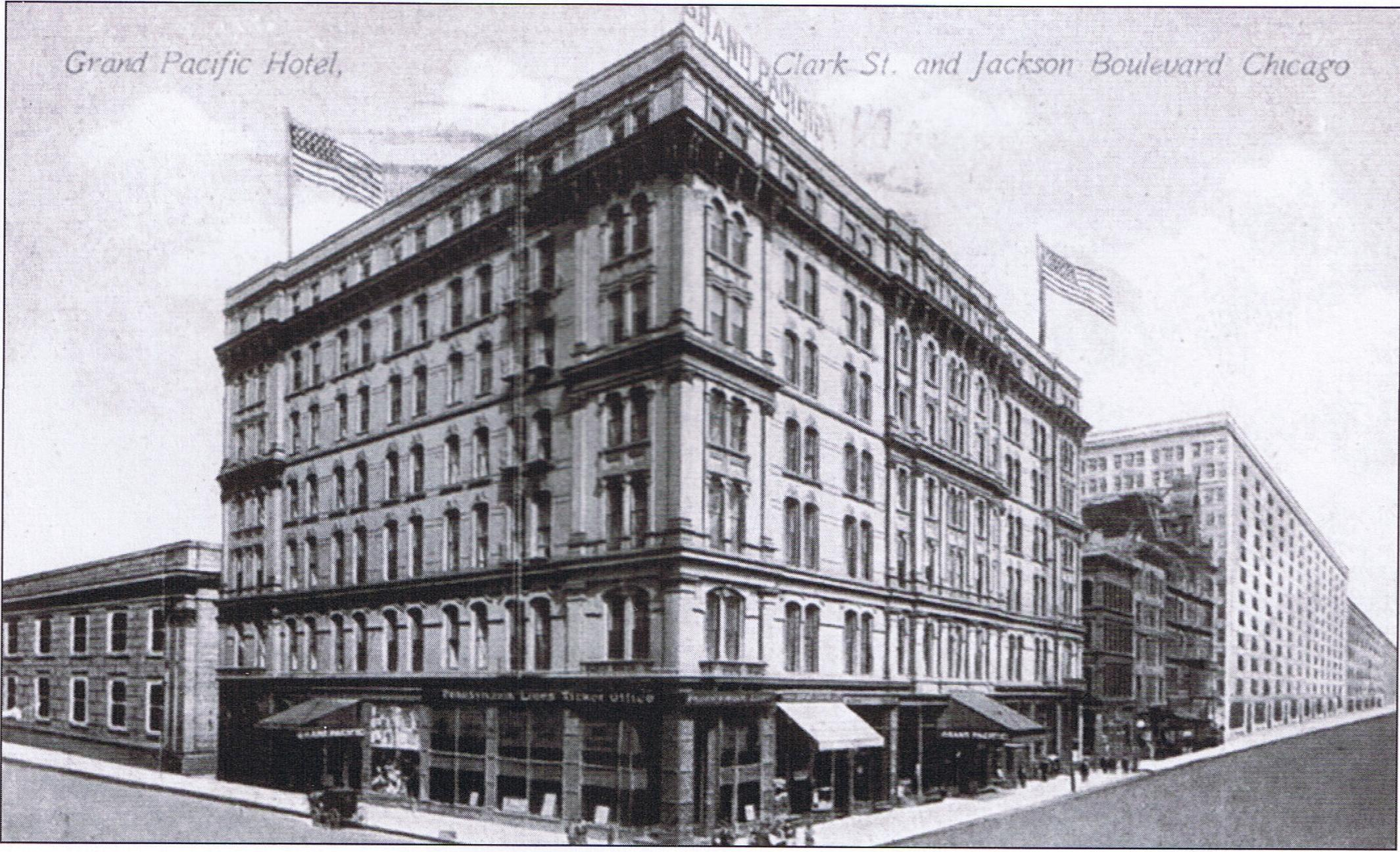
in 1912

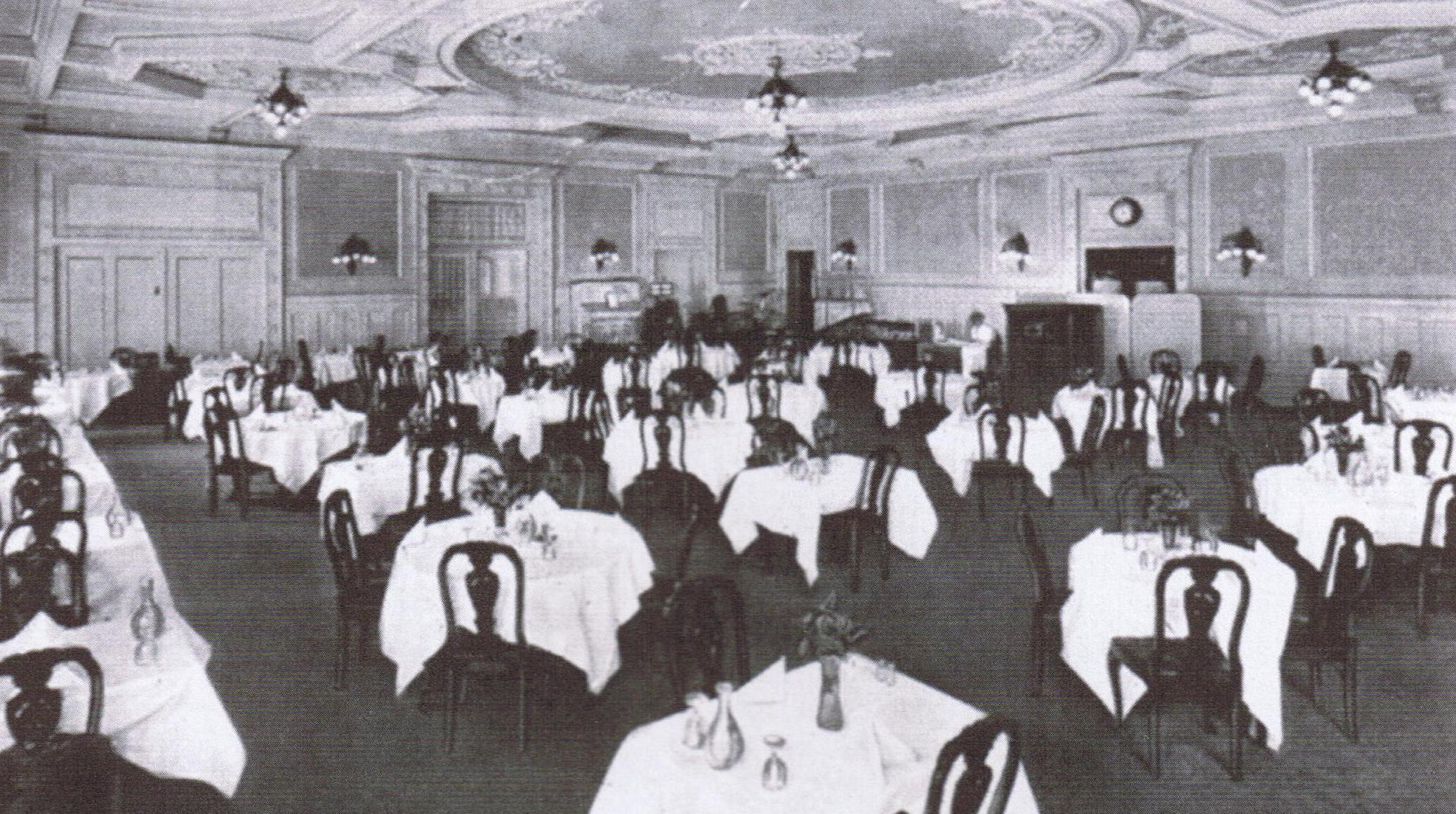
Empire Room one of 15 dining rooms in 1913

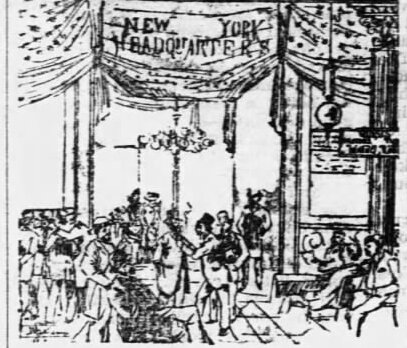
Illustration of the New York delegation's headquarters at the hotel during the 1888 Republican National Convention
