= James T. Gallagher =

Sportswriter and baseball executive

Gallagher

James Timothy Gallagher (June 9, 1904 – April 9, 2002) was a sports writer and baseball executive who served as general manager of the Chicago Cubs.

Gallagher worked as a sports writer for the Chicago Herald-American. He succeeded Charles Weber as general manager of the Cubs after the 1940 season. He served in the Cubs' front office until resigning in October 1956.[Chicago Tribune, October 12, 1956, p.1]

During and after his time with the Cubs, he served on various MLB committees, on topics such as expansion and playing rules.
