= Dan O'Brien Sr. =

American baseball executive

- O'Brien during his time with the Seattle Mariners, 1979–1983
- Born: March 26, 1929; Elizabeth, New Jersey, U.S.
- Died: January 16, 2017 (aged 87); Dallas, Texas, U.S.
- Education: Seton Hall University, Florida Southern College
- Occupation: Baseball executive
- Years active: 1955–1993
- Children: 3, including Dan O'Brien Jr.

Daniel Francis O'Brien Sr. (March 26, 1929 – January 16, 2017) was an American professional baseball executive who served as the general manager of the Texas Rangers, Seattle Mariners and California Angels of Major League Baseball (MLB).

== Biography ==
Born in Elizabeth, New Jersey, O'Brien was a graduate of Thomas Jefferson High School. He attended Seton Hall University and graduated from Florida Southern College, where he played varsity baseball and basketball. He served in the United States Army during the Korean War and was discharged in 1954.

O'Brien was a general manager in Minor League Baseball during 1955–1963 in the Pittsburgh Pirates and Milwaukee Braves organizations, then spent another nine years (1964–1972) as the chief assistant to Phil Piton and Hank Peters, presidents at the time of the National Association of Professional Baseball Leagues (NAPBL), the governing body of the minor leagues.

O'Brien came to the major leagues when he joined the Texas Rangers as a vice president during the 1973 season, and was promoted to general manager of the Rangers on September 2 of that year; he would continue in that post through 1978, although he shared power with co-general manager Eddie Robinson in both 1977 and 1978. In 1979, O'Brien became president of the Seattle Mariners, then in their third year as an American League expansion team, and he added the general manager title to his duties during 1981–1983, replacing Lou Gorman. He left Seattle in October 1983 and joined the front office of the Cleveland Indians in 1986, working with Peters again as his top assistant during 1987–1989. O'Brien then moved to the California Angels as top aide to general manager Mike Port, and then succeeded Port as the team's GM from the close of the 1991 season through 1993. He was replaced by Whitey Herzog at the end of the 1993 campaign.

Of O'Brien's three major league teams, only the Rangers of the late 1970s experienced sustained success, contending for, but never winning, the American League West division title. The Mariners climbed to the middle of the pack in the AL West in 1982, then fell into the basement with 102 losses in O'Brien's last year. In Anaheim, O'Brien inherited a .500 team, but the Angels lost 90 games in 1992 and 91 games during the 1993 season.

His son and namesake, Dan O'Brien Jr., served as general manager of the Cincinnati Reds during 2003–2006.

O'Brien died on January 16, 2017, in Dallas, Texas, at the age of 87.

Sporting positions
Preceded by Joe Burke	Texas Rangers general manager 1973–1978	Succeeded by Eddie Robinson
Preceded by Position vacant	Seattle Mariners president 1979–1983	Succeeded by Chuck Armstrong
Preceded by Lou Gorman	Seattle Mariners general manager 1981–1983	Succeeded by Hal Keller
Preceded by Mike Port	California Angels general manager 1992–1993	Succeeded by Whitey Herzog
