= Edward G. Mason =

American lawyer and historian (1839–1898)

Edward Gay Mason (August 23, 1839–December 18, 1898) was an American lawyer and historian. He was one of the leading attorneys in Chicago during his career, and was president of the Chicago Historical Society. He also held roles in the governance of his alma mater, Yale.

== Early life, family history, and education ==
Mason was born August 23, 1839 in Bridgeport, Connecticut. He was the son of Roswell B. Mason and Harriet L. Mason. Mason's father moved the family to Chicago, Illinois in the early history of Chicago (in the years it was still a village, rather than a city). A civil engineer, his father was involved in several emerging business enterprises in Chicago and eventually served the city's mayor.

Mason himself completed college preparatory studies in Chicago, attending Yale University and graduating in 1860. Two of Mason's siblings, Henry B. Mason and Alfred B. Mason, also later attended Yale (in the graduating classes of 1870 and 1871, respectively).

== Legal career ==
In 1863, he was admitted to a legal bar and subsequently entered practice in a law firm formed with Walter Mattocks and John Mattocks under the name "Mattocks & Mason". This firm lasted from 1866 until 1881.

Mattocks was a leading member of the Illinois Bar Association. He also was a leading member of the Chicago Bar Association, and served as its president.

== Work as a historian ==
Mattocks served as president of the Chicago Historical Society from 1887 until 1898. He was also a member of various other historical societies.

Mattocks authored several important published works related to histories. Among his works were numerous papers on the formative history of Illinois that were collected and published together as the 1901 publication Chapters from Illinois History. He also authored history-focused articles that were published in various magazines.

== Yale fellow and trustee ==
Mason was a fellow and trusttee of the Yale Corporation from 1891 until his death in 1898. He was regarded to be the "Chicago representative". He was also involved in the Chicago Yale Association. Prior to his death, he was considered a possible successor to Timothy Dwight V to serve as the next president of Yale University.

== Other work and involvement ==
Mattocks served as president of the Chicago Literary Club, and the University Club of Chicago.

== Personal life ==
Mason's home was at 4623 Ellis Avenue. Roughly a year before his death, he had bought a home from Ransom Reed Cable on North Side of Chicago where he intended to move, but died before doing so.

=== Spouse and children ===
On December 25, 1867, Mason married Julia Starkweather. Together they had thirteen children (ten sons and three daughters). Their children were:

- Henry Eager Mason (c. 1868–1937) –1889 graduate of Yale, lawyer
- Roswell B. Mason (1873–1934) –1895 graduate of Yale, 1897 graduate of the Northwestern Law School, editor of the Yale Daily News, lawyer, first assistant corporation counsel of Chicago (1899–1902), master in chancery of the Circuit Court of Cook County (1904–1934)
- Julian Starkweather Mason (c.1876–1954) –1898 graduate of Yale, managing editor of the Chicago Evening Post and the New York Herald Tribune, editor in chief of the New York Evening Post
- Norman Howell Mason
- Frederick Ogden Mason
- Ethel Mason Neilson (née Ethel Mason)
- Marjorie Mason
- Edward Hopkins Mason (c.1870–1928) –1892 graduate of Yale, worked in development of electrical power infrastructure in South America and Central America
- Huntington Mason –1899 graduate of Yale
- Maurice Mason –1901 graduate of Yale editor of the Yale Daily News
- George F. Mason
- Lawrence Mason (c. 1882–1939), graduate of Yale University, drama critic for the Toronto Globe and Mail, University of Minnesota english instructor
- Edith Mason

== Death ==
Mason died at the age of 59 in Chicago on December 18, 1898, after a sudden heart attack he suffered on December 16 while he in the vaults of the Chicago Safety Deposit Company. After the onslaught of his heart attack, he collapsed to the floor, hitting his head on the sharp steel edges of safety boxes and suffering severe cuts as a consequence. While he later resumed consciousness for a time, this was not for long. He was brought to St. Luke's Hospital to recover, but died after two days as a consequence his blow to the head.

Due to his notability, Mason's death was major news, being printed as a front page extra in the Chicago Tribune.

Mason's funeral was held December 20, 1898 at his family residence in Chicago. Rev. Joseph Twichell (a close friend of Mason's) presided over the funeral, which was attended by prominent members of civic organizations that Mason had been a member of.
