= Roswell B. Mason =

Mayor of Chicago (1805–1892)

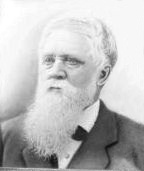

25th Mayor of Chicago
- In office December 6, 1869 – December 4, 1871
- Preceded by: John B. Rice
- Succeeded by: Joseph Medill

Personal details
- Born: September 19, 1805 New Hartford, New York, United States
- Died: January 1, 1892 (aged 86) Chicago, Illinois, United States
- Resting place: Rosehill Cemetery
- Party: Citizens Party
- Spouse: Harriet Lavinia Hopkins (m. 1831; died 1891)
- Children: 8 (including Edward)

Roswell B. Mason (September 19, 1805 – January 1, 1892) served as mayor of Chicago, Illinois (1869–1871) for the Citizens Party.

== Early life ==
Mason was born on September 19, 1805, in New Hartford, New York to Arnold Mason and Mercy Coman. His mother was a lineal descendant of Roger Williams, the founder of Rhode Island. His father Arnold, born in Swansea, Massachusetts, was an engineer instrumental in the construction of the Erie Canal, the Morris Canal, and the High Bridge in New York City.

He married Harriet Lavinia Hopkins on September 6, 1831, and they had eight children.

== Professional life ==
Mason began his career as an engineer working with his father at the age of 17 on a canal construction project in Albany, New York related to the Erie Canal. He subsequently attended an engineering school in Utica, New York. Mason was the first Chief Engineer of the Illinois Central Railroad.

Mason and his family moved in Chicago in 1865, when he was one of several engineers who worked to reverse the flow of the Chicago River to improve health conditions and the cleanliness of Lake Michigan.

Mason held a high position with the Illinois Central Railroad until he decided to run to be Mayor of Chicago.

=== Mayoralty ===
Mason was elected Chicago mayor on a reform ticket in 1869.

Mason was sworn in as mayor on December 6, 1869.

During his administration, the 1871 Great Chicago Fire occurred. Mason responded by directing General Philip Sheridan to place the city under martial law. To date he is the last non Republican or Democratic Mayor of Chicago.

Mason's tenure as mayor ended on December 4, 1871, when he was succeeded by Joseph Medill.

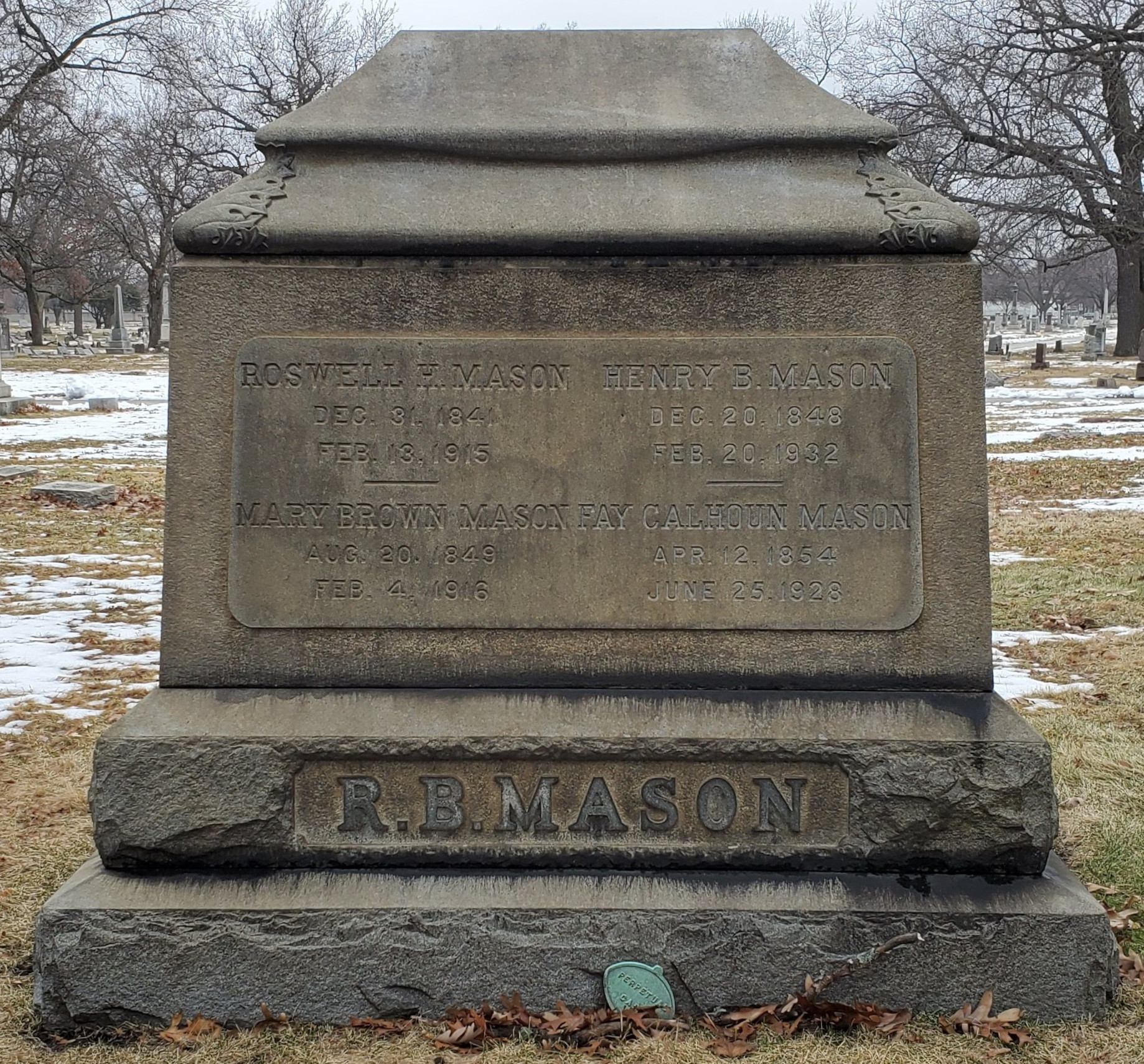
Mason's grave at Rosehill Cemetery

== Later life and death ==
Mason's wife Harriet died on March 29, 1891.

He died at his home in Chicago on January 1, 1892, and was buried at Rosehill Cemetery.

A biography of his life was published by one his children, son Henry B. Mason.

== Legacy ==
He is the namesake of Mason, Illinois.

An elementary school in west Chicago is named after him.
