= Sherman House Hotel =

Hotel in Chicago, Illinois (1837–1973)

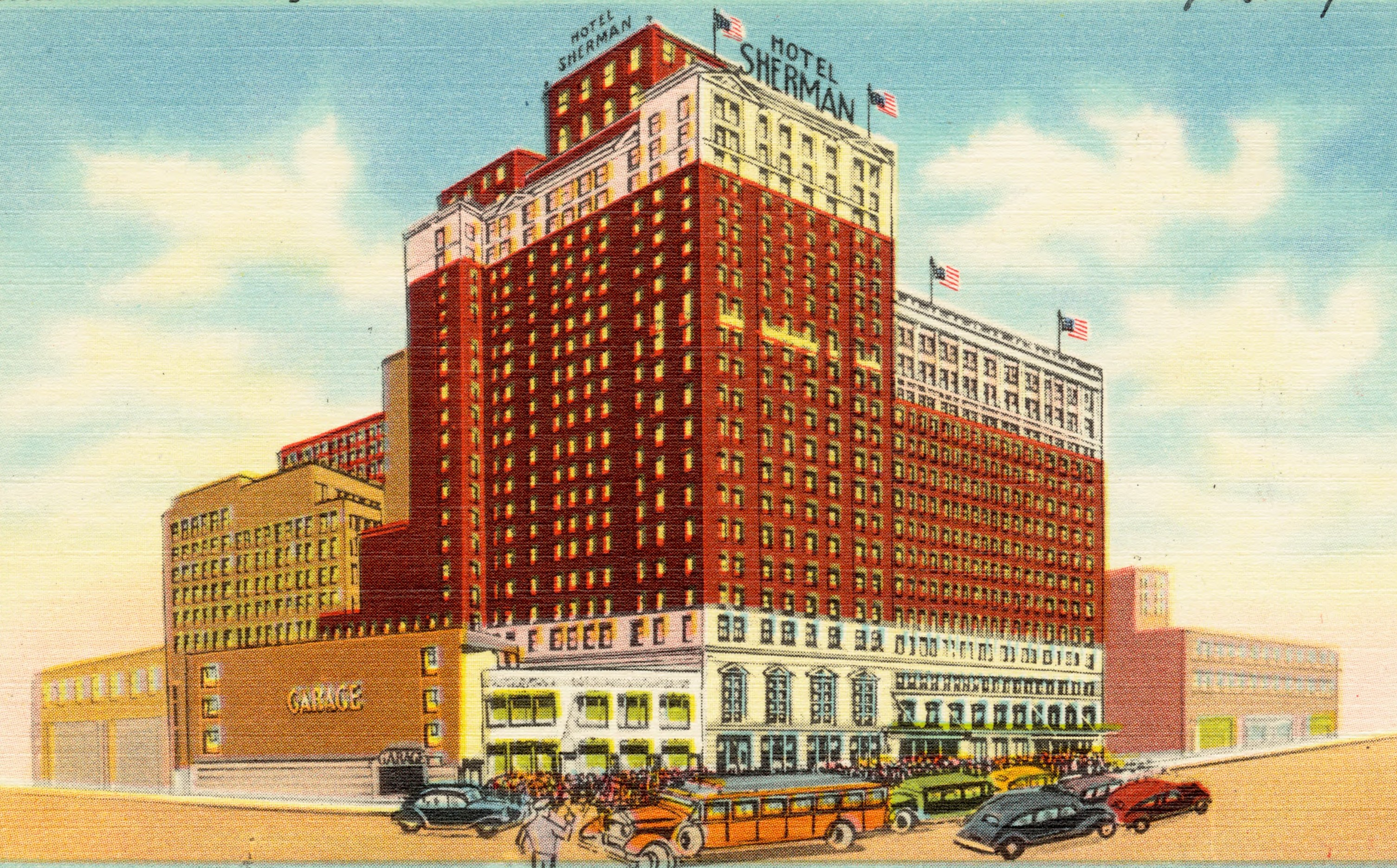
- Postcard image showing the fourth iteration of the hotel (right, completed in 1911) and its annex (left, completed in 1925) with "Hotel Sherman" signage

- Location within Chicago metropolitan area
- 41°53′07″N 87°37′54″W
- Location: Northwest corner of Randolph Street and Clark Street in Chicago Illinois

History
- Built: 1836–1837
- Demolished: c. 1860 (first hotel); 1871 (second hotel); 1910 (third hotel) 1980 (fourth hotel)
- Rebuilt: 1860–1861; 1872–1873; 1910–1911 (annex constructed in 1925)

Site notes
- Architect(s): William W. Boyington (second and third structures); Holabird and Roche (fourth structure)

The Sherman House (sometimes called Hotel Sherman) was a hotel in Chicago, Illinois, that operated from 1837 until 1973, with four iterations standing at the same site at the northwest corner of Randolph Street and Clark Street. Long one of the city's major hotels, the hotel's fortunes declined in the 1950s amid changes to its surrounding area, and it closed in 1973. The fourth and final building it had occupied was demolished in 1980 to make room for the James R. Thompson Center.

== First hotel ==
From 1836 to 1837, Francis Cornwall Sherman constructed the hotel at the northwest corner of Randolph Street as the "City Hotel". It was three stories tall. It was renamed the Sherman House in 1844 after Sherman remodeled it, with two stories added to it.

In 1839, Sherman retired from managing the hotel, handing over management to the firm of James Williamson and A.H. Squier. The next year, Williamson retired from the firm, and William Rickards acquired his interest. Proprietorship of the hotel remained in the possession of Rickards and Squier until 1851, when they sold their proprietorship to the firm of Brown & Tuttle. In 1854, the firm became Tuttle & Patmor when A. H. Patmor acquired Brown's share in that firm. In 1858, proprietorship was acquired by Martin Hodge and Hiram Longly.

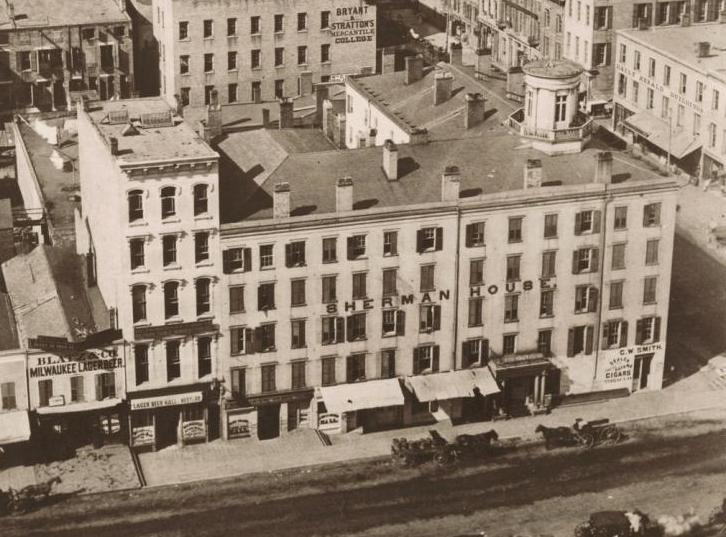
First hotel in 1858

== Second hotel ==
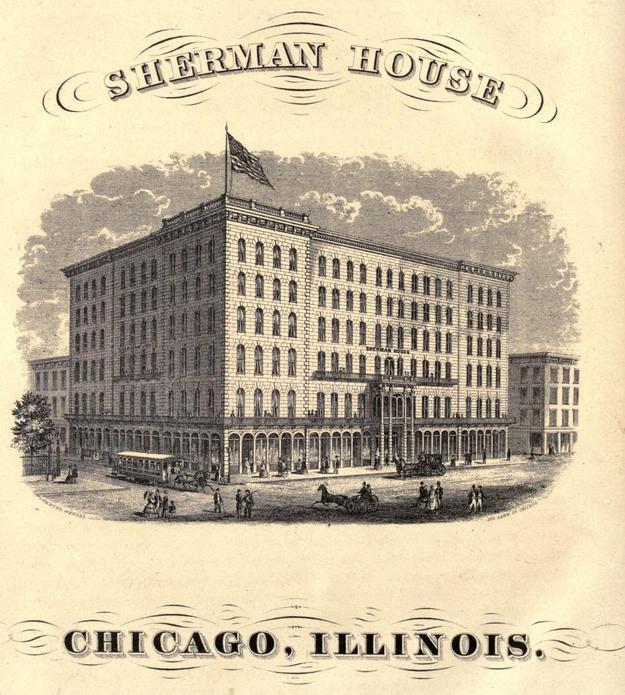
Illustration of the second Sherman House Hotel

At the same site as the first hotel, Francis Cornwall Sherman built a new structure, breaking ground on May 1, 1860, and opening the new structure to guests on July 1, 1861. The structure was designed by William W. Boyington. It became one of the city's grand hotels, alongside the Tremont House. The front of the building was made of Athens marble on the levels above it storefronts. Its primary entrance was along Clark street, with a two-story portico. To the right of the main entrance was the building's ladies' entrance. The building was 161 feet long along Randolph Street and 181 feet long along Clark Street. The building had an open court in its center, and rose six stories. There was a western section of the building along Couch Place that rose seven stories. The building was designed in modern Italian style.

Journalist James W. Sheahan wrote that the hotel's public spaces, including its Grand Hall, parlors, and reception rooms, "are not surpassed in size or general convenience by any similar hotel apartments in the country."

The hotel was lost in the Great Chicago Fire in 1871. Before the fire, the hotel was operated by George W. Gage.

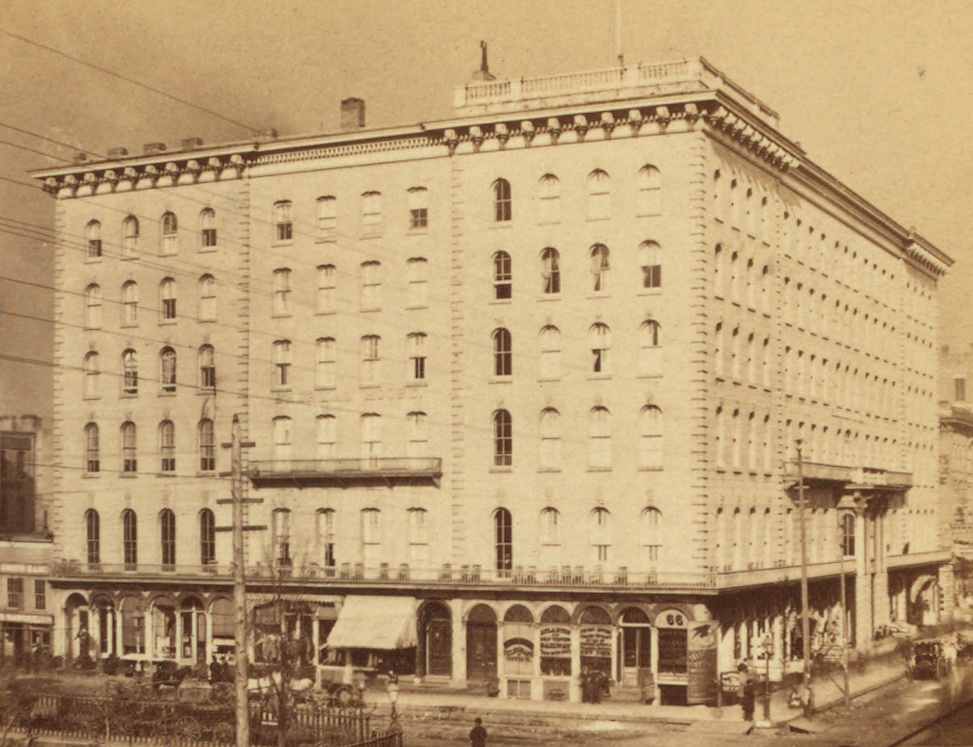
Photograph of the hotel's second iteration

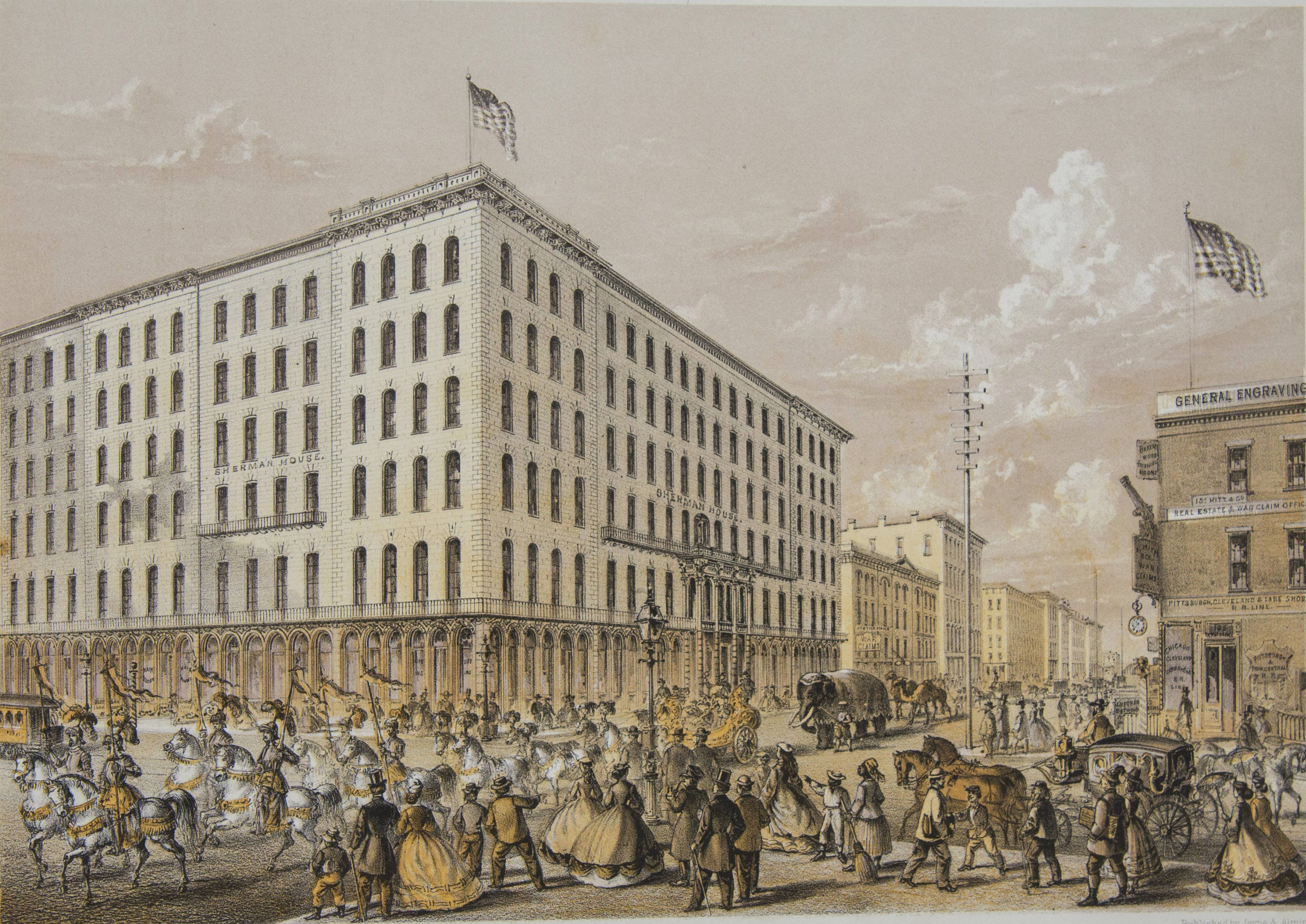
1866 illustration of the hotel's second iteration

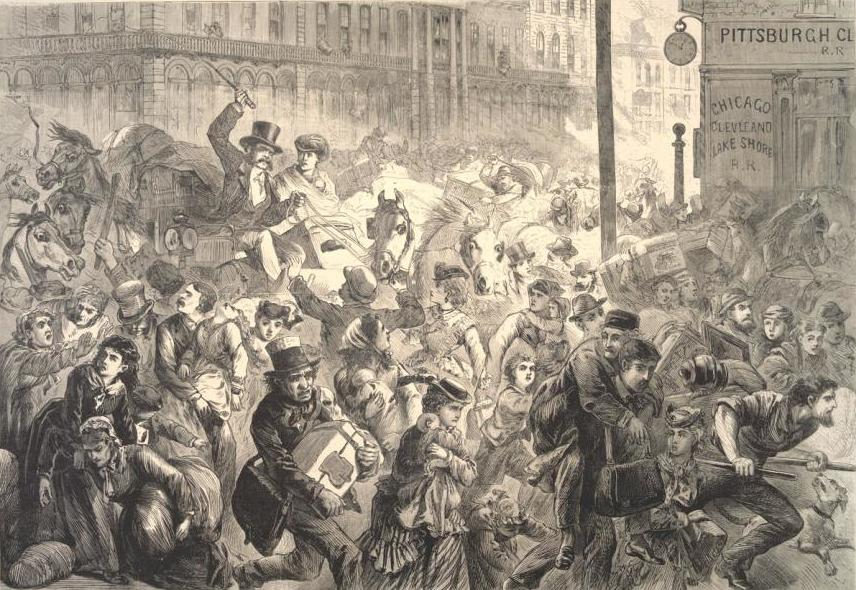
Illustration of a panicked scene outside of the hotel on the night of the Great Chicago Fire

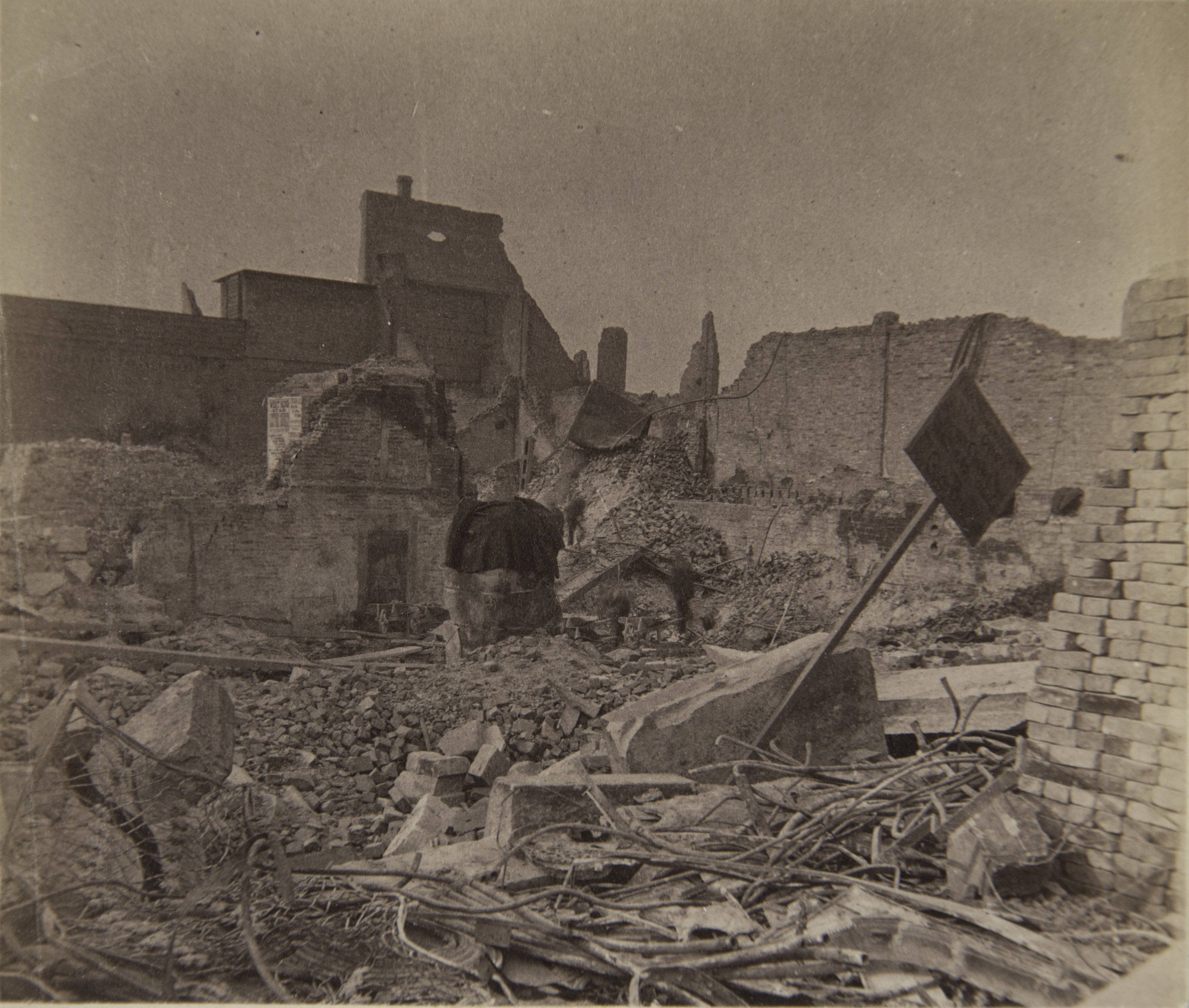
Ruins of the second hotel following the Great Chicago Fire

== Little Sherman House ==
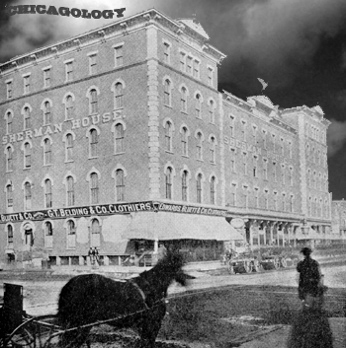
The Sherman House operated out of the Gault House after the fire (an interim arrangement that was dubbed "Little Sherman House")

Following the fire, the hotel operation briefly relocated to the former Gault House at Madison Street and Clinton Street, until they could build their new structure. While operating at this site, it was referred to as the "Little Sherman House".

== Third hotel ==
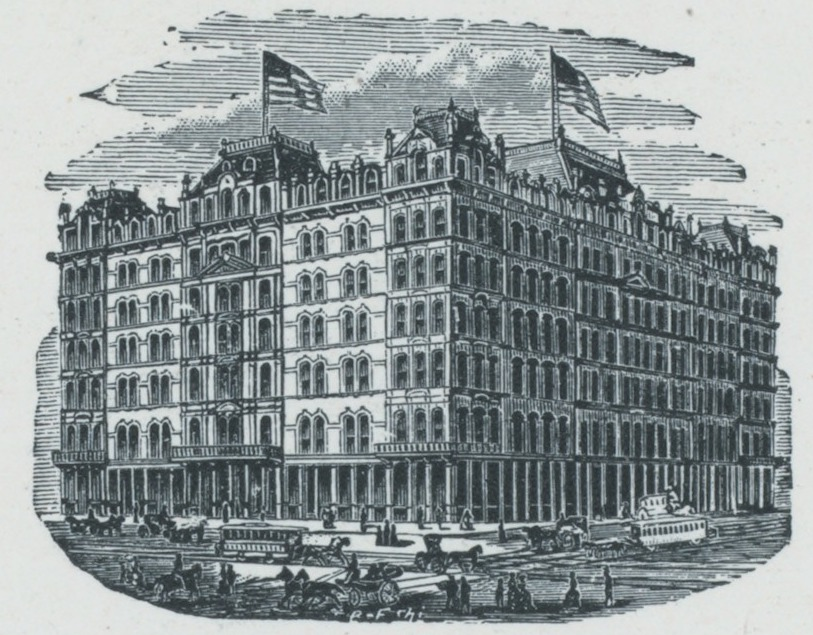
Third hotel

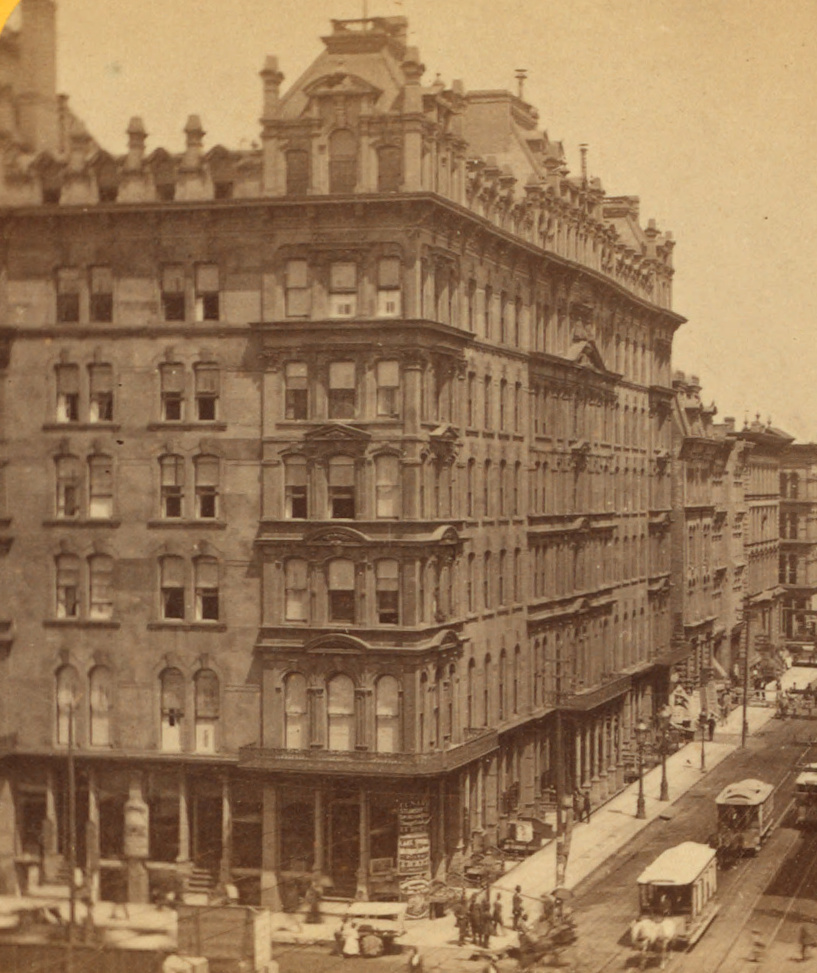
Third hotel

The hotel was rebuilt again. From 1872 to 1873, the hotel's third structure was constructed at the same site as the previous hotels. The third hotel, as with the second, was designed by William W. Boyington. The building was 160 feet long along Randolph Street and 181 feet long along Clark Street. As with the previous building, the entrance was located along Clark Street. The ladies' entrance was along Randolph Street. The building had a courtyard, and featured fireproof vaults. The building was constructed from gray sandstone quarried from a newly opened quarry in Kankakee, Illinois. The building was 115 feet tall. It contained 300 luxurious rooms, including suites.

The hotel was one of the city's "big four" post-fire hotels, the other three being the Grand Pacific, Palmer House, and the Tremont House.

The hotel attracted high-profile theater actors to reside in it, including Joseph Jefferson and Maurice Barrymore.

The hotel came to be the Chicago headquarters of the Democratic Party.

In 1904, Joseph Beifeld became owner of the hotel. For the twenty years prior to that, the hotel had been run by J. Irving Pierce, who had been proceeded by three generations of the Sherman family in operating the hotel.

The hotel was home to the famous College Inn restaurant.

In September 1909, the hotel closed to be replaced with a new structure.

== Fourth hotel ==
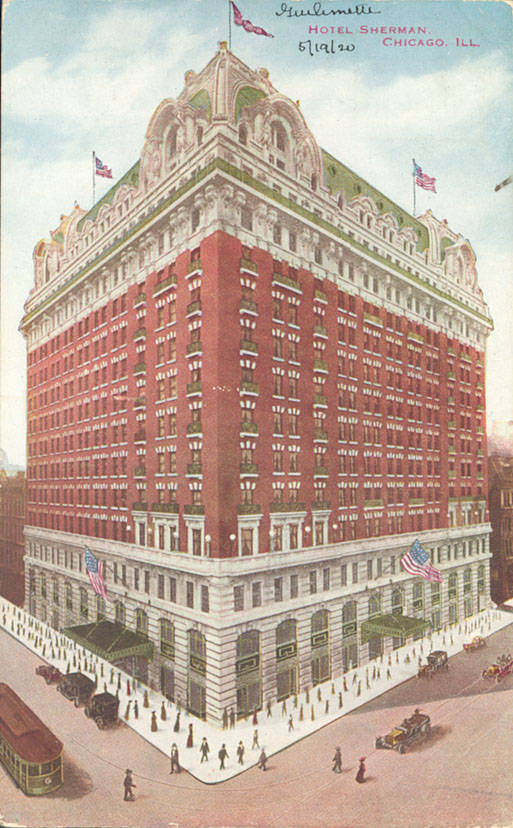
Postcard of the fourth structure, as it originally appeared

Constructed from 1910 to 1911, and designed by Holabird and Roche, the new 757-room Sherman House Hotel retained the establishment's status of being one the nicest hotels in the city from the time it opened, until the 1950s. It was a modern hotel housed in a twelve-story skyscraper of steel and masonry construction. It was constructed in the Second Empire style.

The hotel contained a new College Inn, a popular site for big band music performances.

As with the previous hotel, the new hotel was the Chicago headquarters of the Democratic Party, housing the formal headquarters of the Cook County Democratic Party. However, in 1932, the Cook County Democratic Party moved its headquarters to the third floor of the Morrison Hotel.

In 1920, the building's decorative mansard roof was demolished and an additional six floors were added to the building, bringing it to seventeen stories.

On April 12, 1924, the AM radio station WLS began broadcasting from a studio in the hotel.

A 23-floor annex was constructed in 1925.

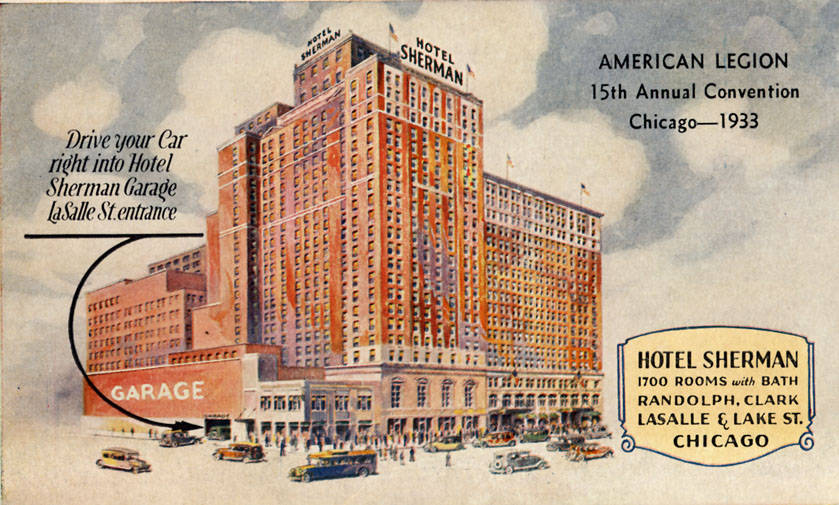
Advertisement postcard showing the hotel as it appeared after both the 1920 vertical expansion and the construction of the 1925 annex

Ernie Byfield, one of the hotel's owners, built a two-story, four-bedroom residence atop the hotel's roof, with plans of living there himself. However, he never lived there, as there proved to be tremendous demand by politicians and famous actors to stay in this apartment. The first people to stay in that apartment were President Calvin Coolidge and First Lady Grace Coolidge.

The hotel's venues, such as the College Inn, Panther Room, Well of the Sea, and Scuttlebutt Lounge, for years, were famed institutions. The College Inn was a popular venue for musicians to perform. The hotel, for years, anchored a vibrant district of the city full of popular theaters, restaurants, and hotels. It attracted many celebrities. It was also a popular gathering place for politicians who worked at nearby Chicago City Hall. It hosted events, such as the 1938 NFL draft. In the 1950s and 1960s, however, the demolition of the adjacent Ashland Block skyscraper (and its replacement with a Greyhound Lines bus terminal), the demolition of the Garrick Theatre/Schiller Building, and the land clearance taking place to make way for the Chicago Civic Center (now named the Richard J. Daley Center) greatly diminished the liveliness of this district. In the 1950s, the hotel's reputation began to decline.

In 1969, a 10x57 large foot concrete relif sculpture entitled The Form Makers: 1836–1969 by Nehemia Azaz was added to the lobby of the hotel.

In either 1971 or 1972, a decision was made to strip the building to its steel frame and reconstruct it as a modern building with a glass curtain wall, transforming the building into an apparel mart named the "Sherman Fashion Plaza". A new 28-floor hotel structure was planned to be built adjacent to it. At the time this decision was made, the hotel was operated by Gerald S. Kaufman. The hotel was closed in 1973, fixtures were stripped from it, contents were sold, and the building subsequently sat vacant for roughly seven or eight years. The renovation never materialized, as ownership had been unsuccessful in receiving financing for the partial demolition and reconstruction of the building. The owners had taken a loan from the Teamster Local 710 pension fund in 1974, and the pension fund began legal proceedings in January 1976 to attempt to foreclose the building's ownership after they failed to repay the loan.

In November 1978, Mayor Michael Bilandic, as part of a broader $7.4 billion five-year public works plan that was planned to reshape much of the city, proposed building a new State of Illinois office building on the site occupied by the structure of former hotel. In 1980, the building was demolished to be replaced by the State of Illinois Center (since renamed the James R. Thompson Center). While the majority of the building had been vacant after the hotel's closure, up until shortly before the building's demolition, street level businesses continued to operate out of the building's storefronts before they were ordered by a Circuit Court judge to vacate so that demolition could begin on the structure. Due to its location at a busy area of the Chicago Loop, it was decided to dismantle the building floor by floor, as opposed to imploding it. A number of other neighboring structures were also demolished in order to make room for the new state office building.
