= Norman T. Gassette =

American baseball executive and politician

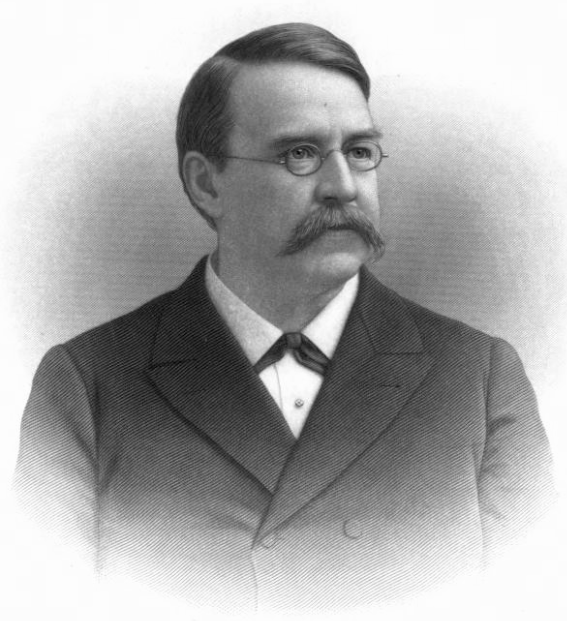

Clerk of the Circuit Court of Cook County
- In office December 1868 – December 1872

Personal details
- Born: Norman Theodore Gassette; April 21, 1839 Townshend, Vermont, US
- Died: March 26, 1891 (aged 51) Chicago, Illinois, US
- Resting place: Rosehill Cemetery

Norman T. Gassette
- Chicago White Stockings President

Teams
- Chicago White Stockings (1870–1871)

Norman Theodore Gassette (April 21, 1839 – March 26, 1891) was an American baseball executive and politician. He was president of the Chicago White Stockings for the last part of 1870 and through 1871. He also served as Clerk of the Circuit Court of Cook County from 1868 through 1872.

== Early life ==
Norman T. Gassette was born in April 21, 1839 in Townshend, Vermont to father Silas B. Gassette and mother Susana P. Gassette (née Martin). He lived in Springfield, Massachusetts until December 1849, when his family moved to Chicago, Illinois.

He attended the Garden City Institute. He then received private tutoring. At 17, he began attended Shurtleff College in Alton, and a year later began attending the Altwater Institute in Rochester, New York. He completed his education by learning the entire Harvard curriculum under private tutors.

== Civil War ==
On June 17, 1861 he was mustered into the Union Army as a private of Company A, 19th Illinois Volunteer Infantry. Soon transferred to staff duty, by the Battle of Chickamauga he was a first lieutenant, and after that a brevet Lt. Col.

== Career ==
Gassette left military service in October 1864. Having taken a course of the legal studies department of the University of Chicago, he was admitted to the legal profession.

He was appointed deputy Cook County Clerk under Edward S. Salomon, holding that position from 1866 through 1868.

He was elected in the fall of 1868 by an overwhelming majority as a Republican to serve as Clerk of the Cook County Circuit Court, and served in this office from 1868 until December 1872. In this role, he was also ex-officio county recorder of deeds (the independent office of Cook County Recorder of Deeds would be created immediately following the end of his tenure).

During his roles in government, and until 1873, he was a very active Republican. Gassette chaired several campaign committees, including that of Charles B. Farwell for Congress.

He joined the masonic order in 1864, being made a master mason. He rose to the rank of Grand Commander in Illinois. At his death, he was charged as representative for the freemasons of the construction of Chicago's Masonic Temple building.

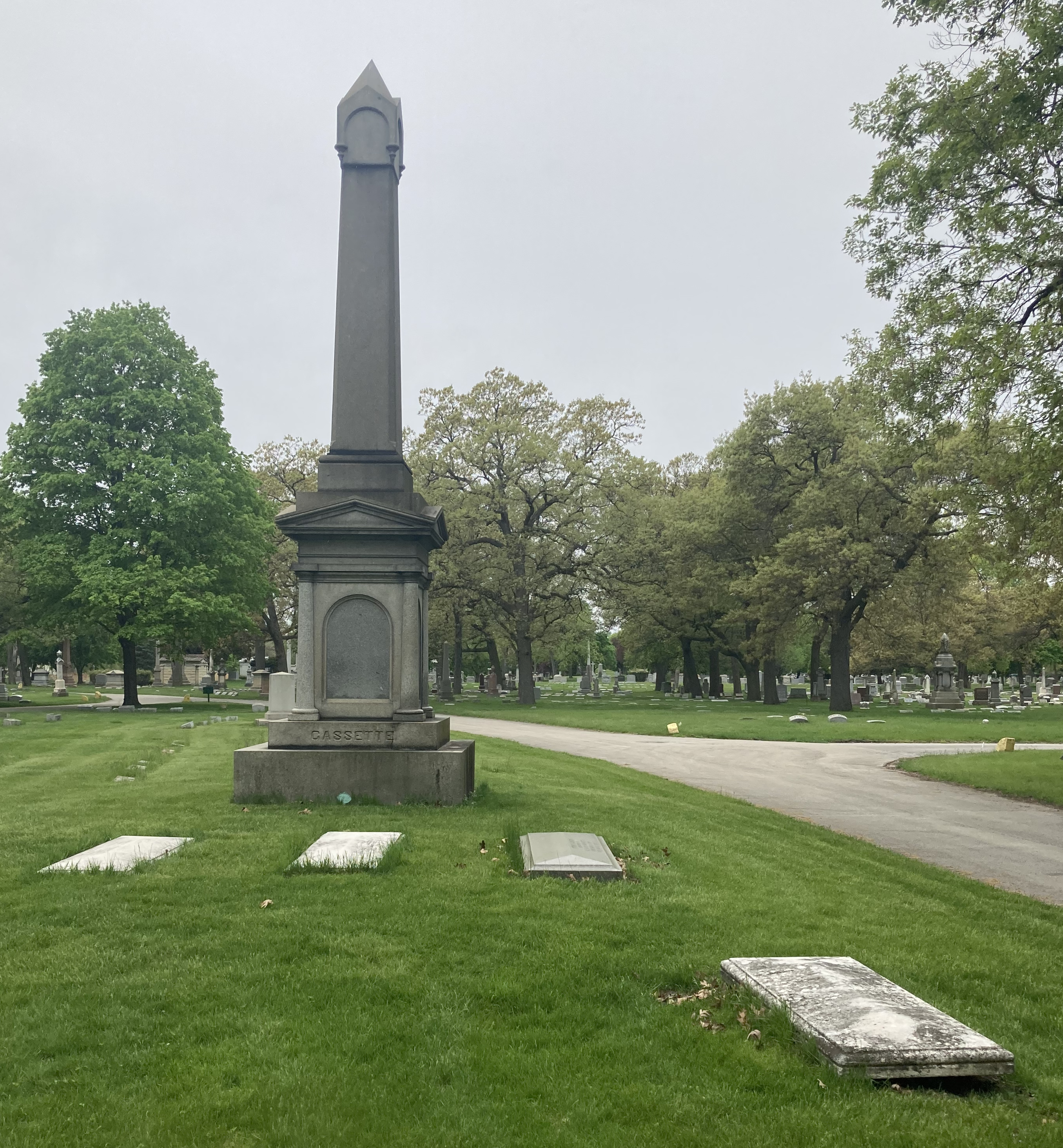
Gassette's grave (leftmost) at Rosehill Cemetery

On August 9, 1870, the stockholders of the Chicago White Stockings baseball team elected Col. Gassette as president. Prominent Chicagoans had invested a large sum of their money to organize a professional baseball team in Chicago, but the new team, under the presidency of David Allen Gage, seemed to be directionless. Gassette, a prominent mason and government official, was chosen to right the ship. In the words of the local newspaper, he "commenced the work of weeding out the incompetent material." The White Stockings went on a tear the remainder of the season, defeating their hated rivals the Cincinnati Red Stockings, and claiming the (unofficial) title of best team in the nation. He served as president through 1871. Unfortunately, the Great Chicago Fire of October 1871 put the club out of business. This Chicago White Stockings club later became known as the Chicago Cubs. In 1872 Gassette, as president of the old White Stockings Club, chaired a meeting to revive the team, but after this turned his attention to his other business ventures.

Gassette died from pneumonia at his home in Chicago on March 26, 1891, and was buried at Rosehill Cemetery. His funeral was attended by hundreds of masons.
