= Mike Port =

American baseball player (born 1945)

- Executive
- Born: July 24, 1945 (age 80); Fallbrook, California, U.S.

Teams
- San Diego Padres (1973–1977); California Angels (1978–1991); Boston Red Sox (1993–2004)

Michael D. Port (born July 24, 1945) is an American former professional baseball executive. He was vice president of umpiring for Major League Baseball (MLB) from August 2005 through March 2011. He previously served as a front-office executive for three MLB clubs, including stints as the general manager of the California Angels and as acting general manager of the Boston Red Sox.

== Career ==
=== San Diego Padres ===
Port was born in Fallbrook, California. After attending United States International University in San Diego, Port entered baseball in 1969 as a minor league second baseman for the newly born San Diego Padres of MLB, but after an injury, he retired to become an executive in the Padre organization. In 1973 he became the club's farm system director and moved to the Angels in a similar capacity in 1978.

=== California Angels ===
Port was also adept at the business side of baseball, and in 1980, he was promoted by the Angels to vice president and chief administrative officer. He succeeded Buzzie Bavasi, his boss in both San Diego and Anaheim, as the Angels' general manager late in 1984. After just falling short of winning the American League West Division title in 1985, the 1986 Angels finished first in their division and led three games to one in the 1986 ALCS; they were one out from their first AL title before the Red Sox started a comeback that ended their pennant hopes. After that disappointment, the Angels, with several veteran players nearing the end of their careers, contended only in 1989. During the 1991 campaign—in which the Angels finished seventh and last in their division, despite a record of 81-81 (.500)—Port was dismissed. Nonetheless, during his tenure with the Angels, the Major League club averaged 85 wins per year and, with the assistance of scouting director Bob Fontaine and player development director Bill Bavasi, the Angels signed and developed players such as Tim Salmon, Jim Abbott, Garret Anderson, Troy Percival, Damion Easley, Gary DiSarcina and Jim Edmonds.

=== Boston Red Sox ===
In 1992, Port became the first president of the Arizona Fall League, an annual training ground inaugurated by MLB designed for the elite prospects of all member clubs, then joined the Red Sox as assistant general manager in February 1993. Three years later, he was promoted to the club's post of vice president, baseball operations. In February 2002, immediately after John W. Henry, Tom Werner and New England Sports Ventures took control of the Red Sox, Port was named acting GM. Despite 93 regular-season wins, and Port's midseason acquisition of outfielder Cliff Floyd, Boston finished second in the AL East and missed the Wild Card.

With the appointment of Theo Epstein as Boston's general manager in November 2002, Port resumed his former role. He survived a heart attack, and continued to serve as the Red Sox' VP, baseball operations through the club's 2004 World Championship.

=== Major League Baseball ===
On August 1, 2005, he was named as Major League Baseball's vice president of umpiring and served in that capacity for six seasons. He formerly served as a member of the board of directors of the National Association of Sports Officials. During the 2016 National League Championship Series and World Series, he served as a rules analyst for FOX Sports.

Sporting positions
Preceded by Buzzie Bavasi	California Angels General Manager; 1984–1991	Succeeded by Dan O'Brien Sr.
Preceded by Dan Duquette	Boston Red Sox General Manager; 2002	Succeeded by Theo Epstein
