= Tremont House (Chicago) =

Hotel in Chicago, Illinois, United States

Coordinates: 41°53′08″N 87°37′45″W

The Tremont House was a hotel located in Chicago, Illinois. A modern hotel also bears a similar name.

== Original ==
=== First hotel ===
The original hotel's building was built in 1833. It was a three-story wooden structure located at the northwest corner of the intersection of Lake Street and Dearborn Street. It was lost to a fire in 1839. It took its name from the Boston Tremont House. It was later recounted by a reporter that he recalled the hotel having been a three-story frame structure approximately 80 ft (24 m) long and 70 ft (21 m) wide.

The building was originally a rooming house. Its original proprietor of the property was Starr Foot, who sold it to Malliory & Able in 1835. The operation was then sold to a man named Dorwin in 1837. Dorwin sold the lease months later that year to brothers Ira Couch and James Couch. The Couch brothers turned the building into the city's first hotel, operating it in the building for the two years before it burnt down.

=== Second hotel ===
The second hotel was built after the loss of the first, breaking ground in December 1839 and opening in May 1840. The structure was a three-story frame structure located at the southeast corner of the intersection of Lake and Dearborn streets. It had 93 ft (28 m) of frontage on Dearborn street and 100 ft (30 m) of frontage along Lake Street. It was lost to a fire on July 21, 1841. Around 1839, the brothers purchased the land on which the hotel stood. By the time the building was lost, in 1841, they owned 180 ft (55 m) feet of frontage of the block along Dearborn Street and 140 ft (43 m) of frontage on the block along Lake Street.

=== Third hotel ===
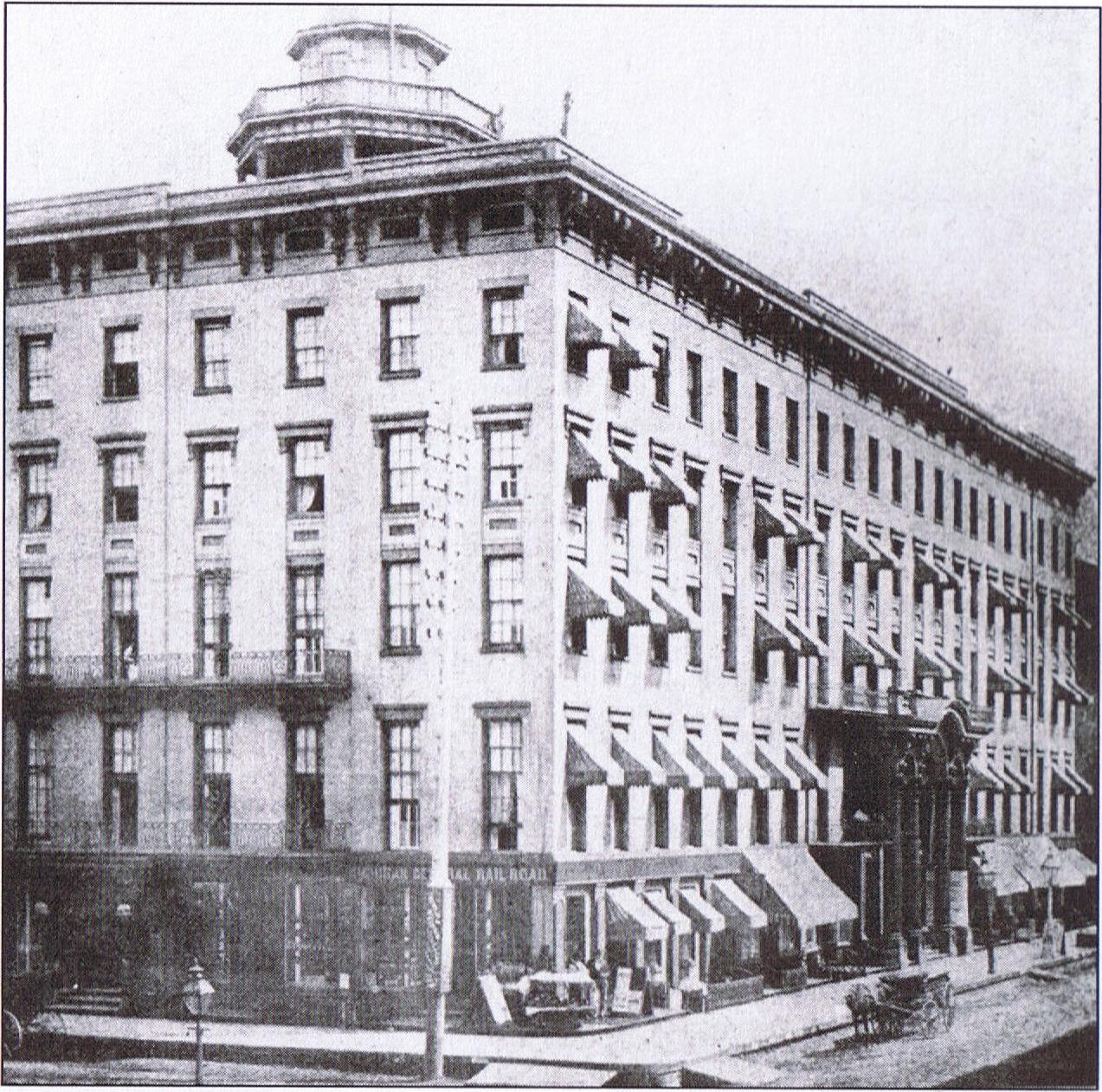
Third hotel

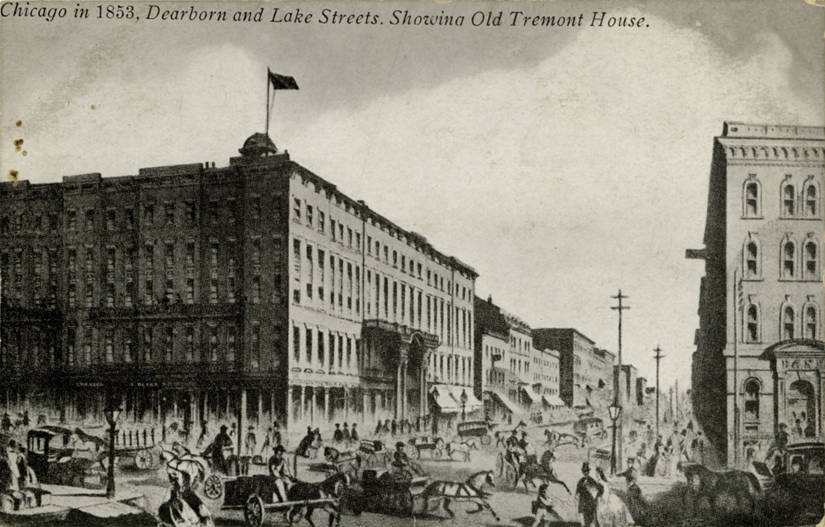
1853 illustration of the street scene outside of the third hotel

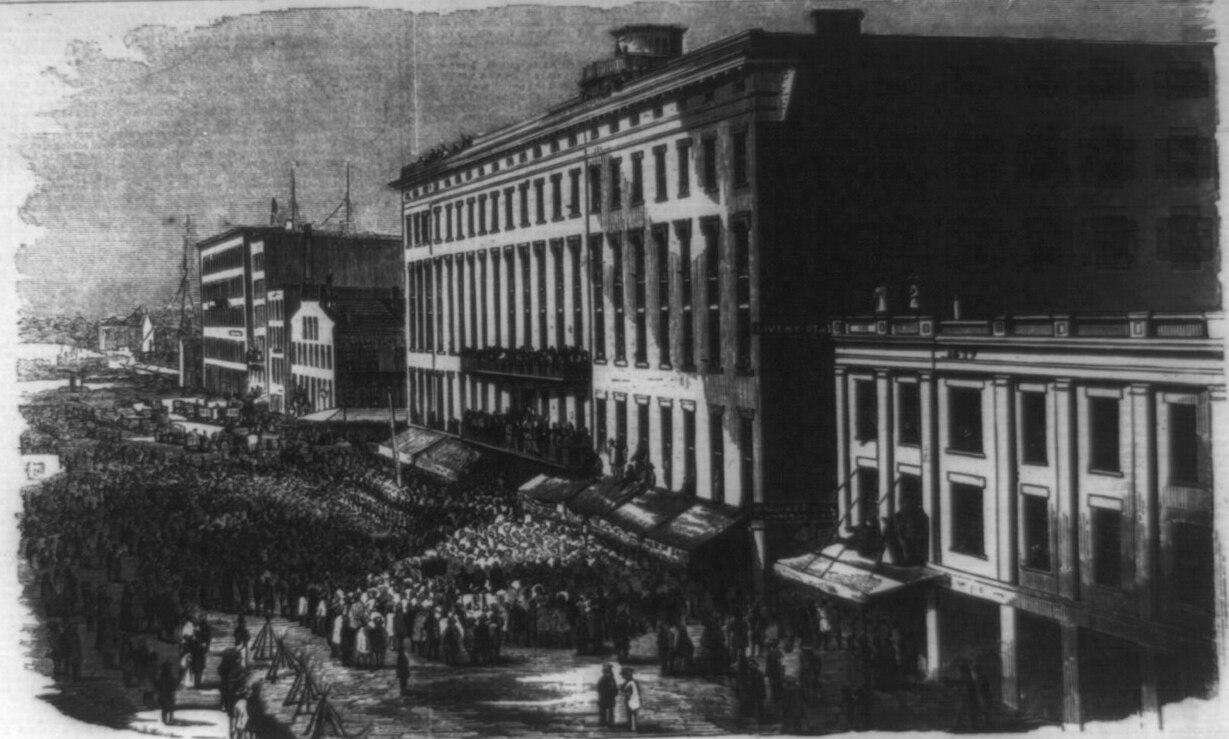
1853 illustration from Frank Leslie's Illustrated Newspaper of a crowd gathered outside the hotel for an event

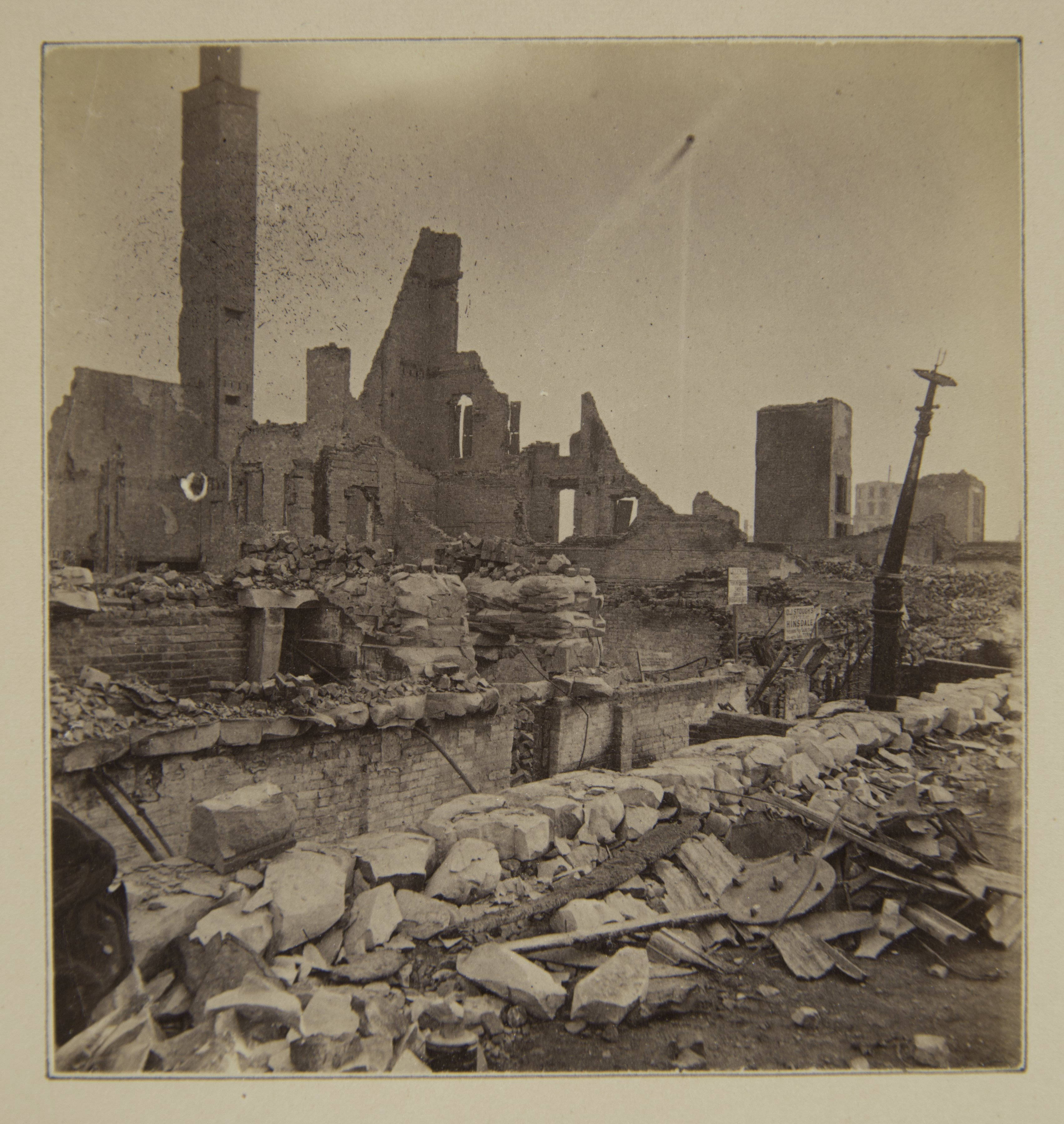
Ruins of the third hotel after the 1871 Great Chicago Fire

After the loss of the second building, a third hotel building was constructed on the same site. It was a five and one-half floor block masonry brick structure with 260 rooms, and was designed by John M. Van Osdel. The new hotel covered the entirety of the land that the Couch brothers had acquired before the loss of previous building. It was equipped with the finest amenities of the day, costing $75,000 to construct and $260,000 to furnish. Many rooms were equipped with the luxury of being en suite-style, with private bathrooms and bathtubs. Before its opening, the new large building was ridiculed as "Couch's Folly" by those that expected it to fail. The third hotel opened its doors on September 29, 1850. For a time, it was considered the leading hotel in the western United States.

At the time the third hotel was constructed, its neighborhood was located at the border of the developed business district and undeveloped prairie land. In 1848, the city's business district had been located on Lake Street west of Clark Street. The area east of Dearborn Street was undeveloped prairie, placing the hotel at the border of the developed business district and undeveloped prairie land. With the construction of the hotel, the undeveloped area began to see some residential construction, before the third hotel and its positive reputation began attracting more intense development to the area.

In 1853, three years after the third incarnation of the hotel opened, the building was leased and the furniture was sold to David Allen Gage and George W. Gage. The Couches had attempted to back out of the agreement shortly after the lease was sold, but relented after the Gages threatened a lawsuit. In 1855, John Drake joined the Gages, acquiring a quarter interest in the hotel's operation. In 1861, he became the sole owner of its operation, and would remain so until 1872.

The building was among the largest to be physically raised when Chicago heightened the grade of its streets in the 1850s and 1860s. In 1861, Ely, Smith and Pullman lifted the Tremont House six feet in the air (George Pullman made his reputation as a building raiser before becoming famous for manufacturing sleeping cars). The building was one of many buildings in Chicago raised to match the upward-shifting street grade during the mid-nineteenth century.

During the 1858 United States senatorial race in Illinois, Stephen A. Douglas, who regularly stayed at the hotel while in Chicago, delivered a July 9, 1858 speech that included a rebuke to Abraham Lincoln's House Divided Speech. Lincoln, who was in Chicago to attend an opening session of United States District Court, appeared at the hotel that night to deliver a rebuttal. This, in a sense, was the start of each individual's campaigns for senate.

The hotel served as the headquarters for the Illinois Republican Party during the 1860 Republican National Convention (held at the nearby Wigwam) as they lobbied for Abraham Lincoln's nomination.

The hotel would become the residence of many prominent residents of Chicago. Additionally, popular gathering spot for notable figures was the hotel's bar room, which actor John Brougham had given the name "House of David". Among the notable frequenters of the "House of David" over the years was former congressman David Stuart. At the time it was lost to fire, a notable resident of the third hotel was former Chicago mayor and former U.S. congressman John Wentworth.

Stephen A. Douglas died at the hotel on June 3, 1861.

In 1865, Mary Lincoln stayed at the hotel for one week following the assassination of her husband. Robert Lincoln and Tad Lincoln stayed with her during that time.

The hotel burned to the ground during the Great Chicago Fire in 1871.

=== Interim post-fire hotel operation ===
During the interim period following the fire, the hotel operated as the "New Tremont House" out of a structure that John Drake had bought at Michigan Avenue and Congress. Drake bought this temporary Hotel as a successful bet that it would escape the fire as the fire was raging across the city.

=== Fourth hotel ===
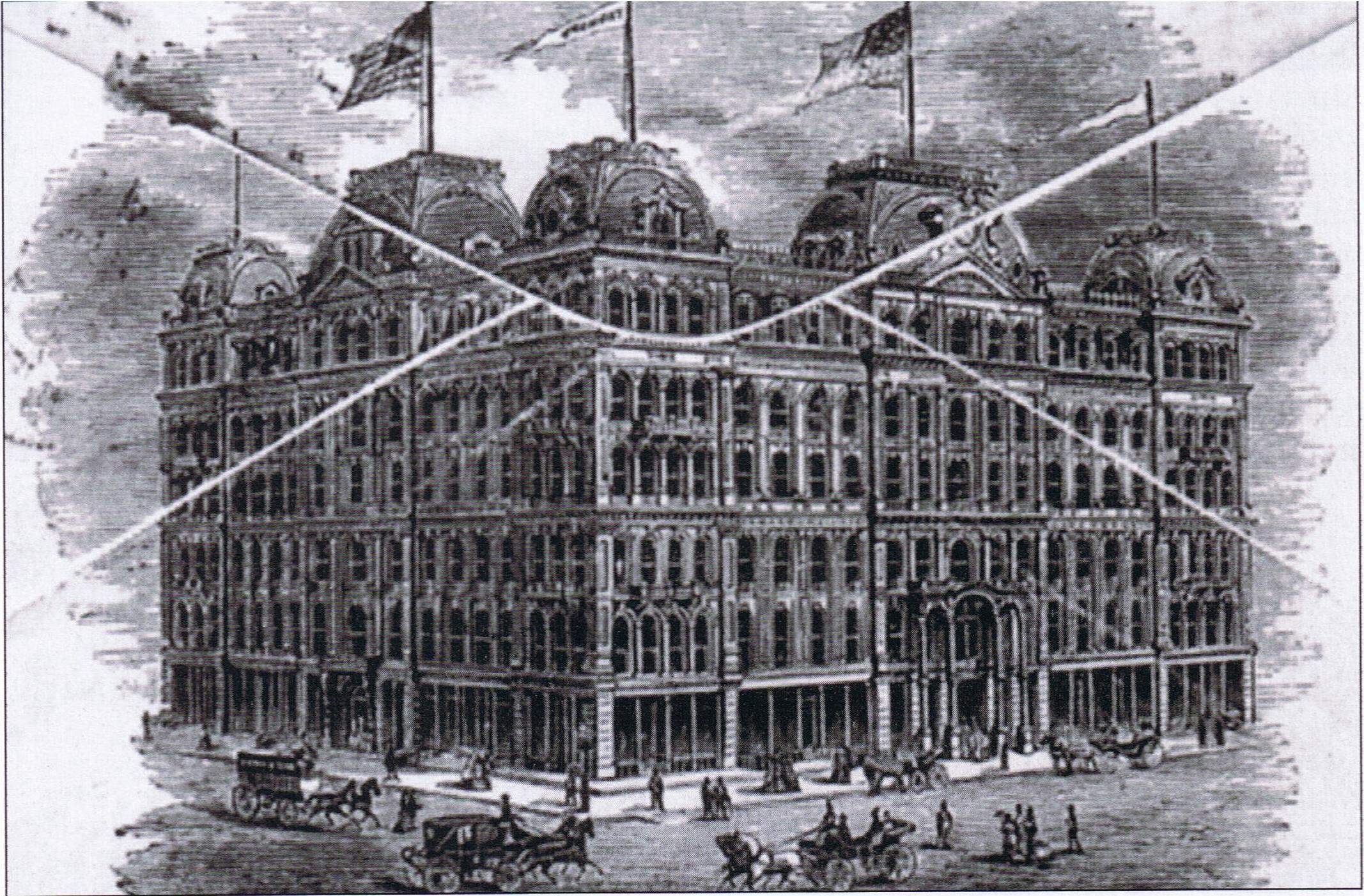
Illustration of the fourth hotel

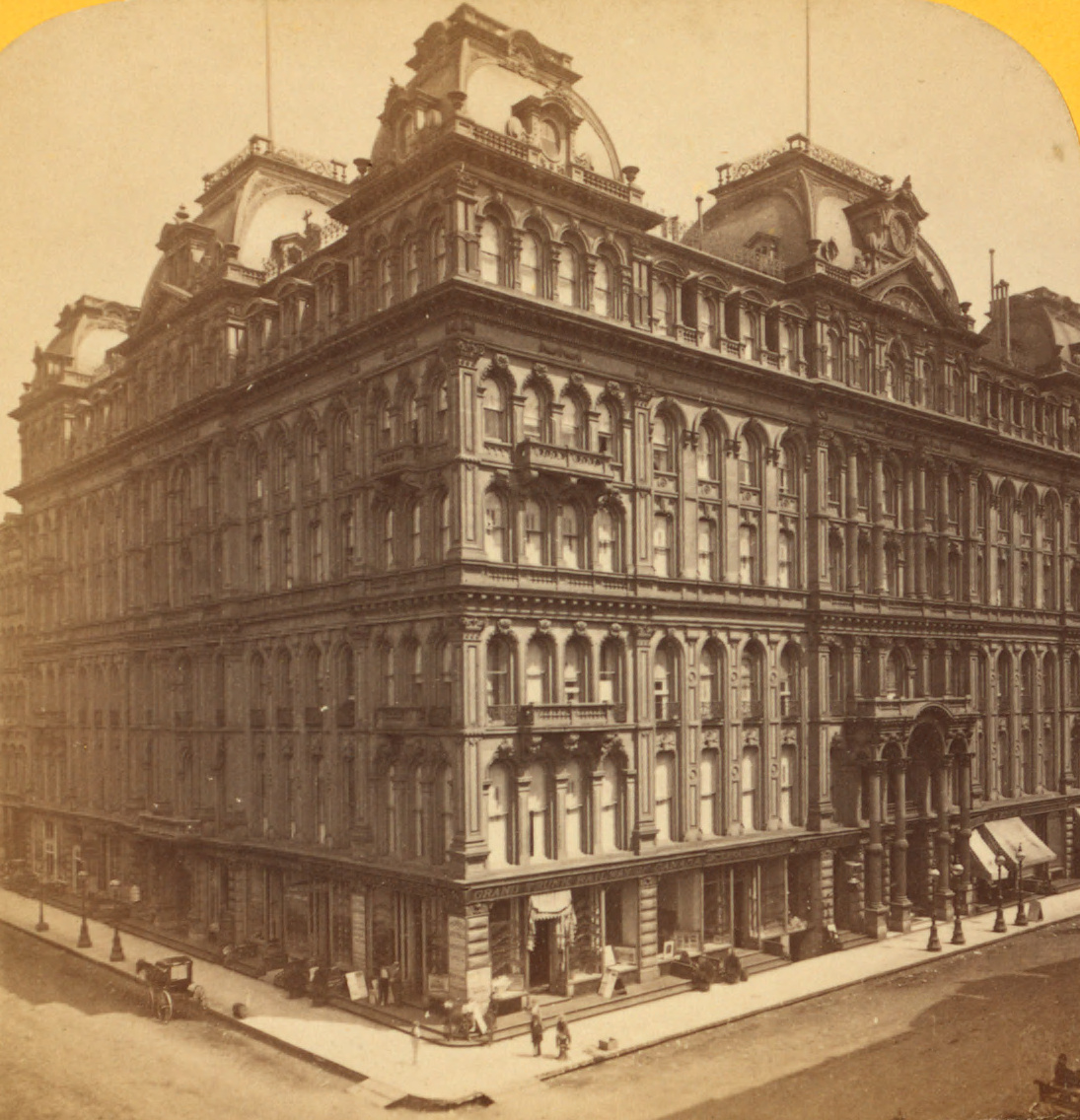
Photograph of the fourth hotel

The fourth hotel was designed by John M. Van Osdel, who had designed the previous third hotel. It opened its doors in 1873. It stood six floors. It was constructed James Couch and the estate of his brother Ira Couch, who had himself died in 1857. The rebuilt hotel remained along with the Palmer House, Grand Pacific Hotel and the Sherman House as a leading hotel after the Great Chicago Fire. It was built in the commercial palazzo architecture style of the day and claimed to be fireproof. James Couch and his son Ira Couch (not to be confused with his late brother of the same name) were the proprietors of the new fourth incarnation of the hotel at its opening. The hotel was one of the city's "big four" post-fire hotels, the other three being the Grand Pacific, Palmer House, and the Sherman House.

The building stood until 1937, but the hotel had closed earlier. In 1902, the building was purchased by Northwestern University, and housed its law, dental, and business schools.

== Modern hotel ==
The Tremont Chicago Hotel is at 100 East Chestnut Street, between Michigan Avenue on the Magnificent Mile and Rush Street. The hotel housed the Chicago location of Mike Ditka's restaurant, which closed in 2020. This block of Chestnut is also known as Mike Ditka Way.
