= Bill Hagenah =

Baseball executive

- Major League Baseball executive
- Born: William J. Hagenah Jr. August 3, 1920; Chicago, Illinois, U.S.
- Died: June 20, 2010 (aged 89); Evanston, Illinois, U.S.

debut
- 1977

Last appearance
- 1981

Teams
- Chicago Cubs

Bill Hagenah (August 3, 1920 – June 20, 2010) was an American Major League Baseball executive with the Chicago Cubs and served as President of Business Operations.

Hagenah was born August 3, 1920, in Chicago and was one month shy of his 90th birthday when he died in Evanston, Illinois, on June 20, 2010.

Kenney was also a graduate of Princeton University where he majored in geology.
