= George W. Gage (baseball) =

- Born: March 9, 1812; Pelham, New Hampshire
- Died: September 24, 1875 (aged 63); Chicago, Illinois
- Occupations: businessman, hotel manager, sports executive, politician
- Spouse: Sarah H. Barker (m. 1844)
- Family: David Allen Gage (brother)
- Baseball career
- Chicago White Stockings President

Teams
- Chicago White Stockings (1872–1875)

Chicago Alderman from the 1st ward
- In office 1864–1866 Serving with Charles D. Peacock Sr. (1864–65); Joshua C. Knickerbocker (1865-66)
- Preceded by: James Hahn
- Succeeded by: William Cox

Member of the Illinois House of Representatives
- In office 1862

Personal details
- Party: Republican

George W. Gage (March 9, 1812 – September 24, 1875) was an American businessman, baseball executive, and politician who served as president of the Chicago White Stockings from 1872 to 1875. He ran unsuccessfully for mayor of Chicago in 1869 as the Republican nominee and served as a member of the South Parks Commission. After he died in 1875, the city named a park after him, making him the namesake of Gage Park and the Chicago community of the same name.

Gage's brother, David Allen Gage, was his business partner.

== Early life ==
Gage was born in Pelham, New Hampshire on March 9, 1812. He received a common school education.

== Business career ==
Gage started his career as a machinist in Lowell, Massachusetts. He began working in the hotel business in Methuen, Massachusetts, going to work in series of hotels in different parts of Massachusetts. He worked in the Merrimack House in Lowell, before moving on to Wild's Hotel in Boston. He then became the proprietor of the City Hotel in that city, being well regarded in that role.

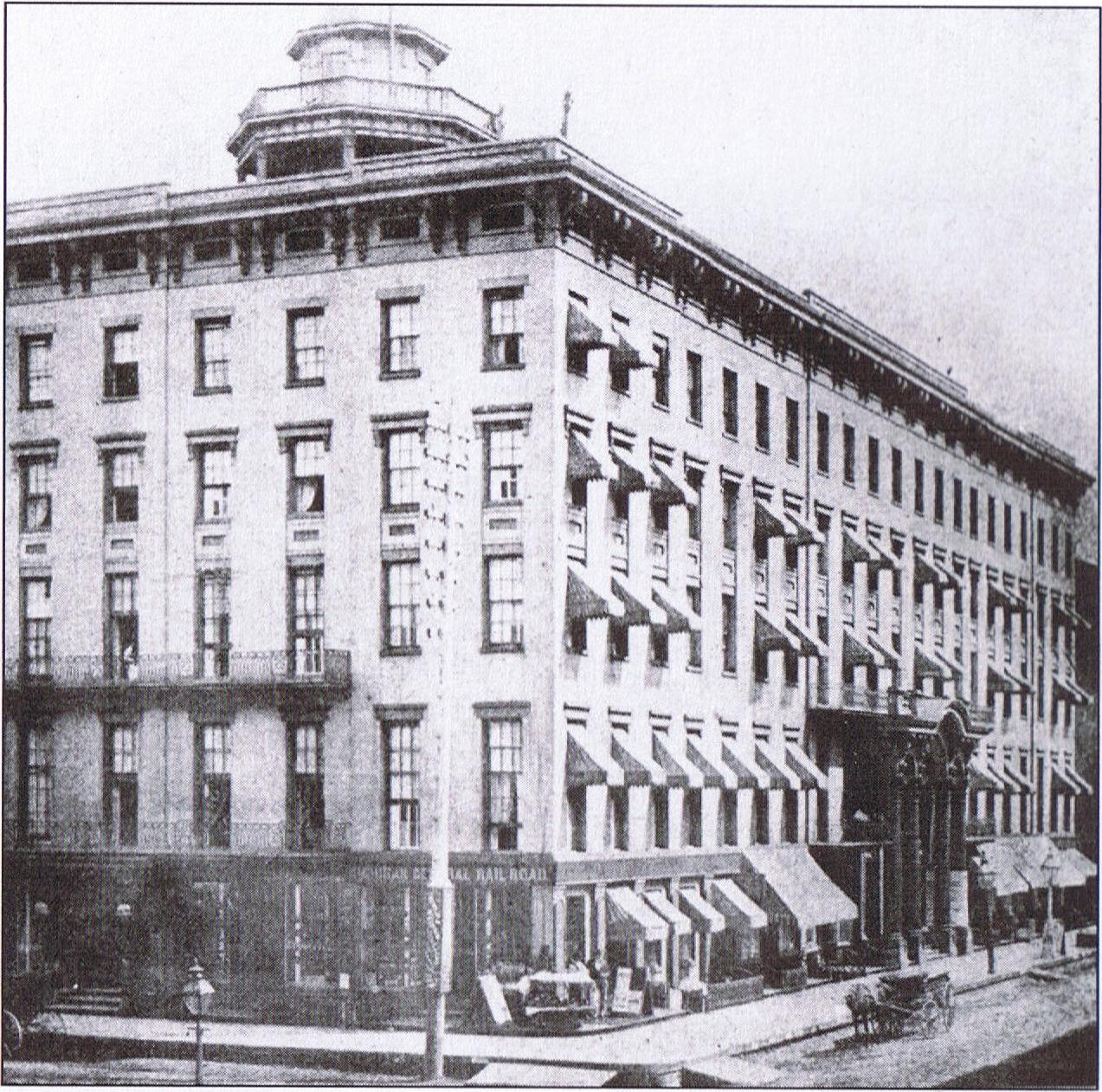
Gage operated the Tremont House

Gage moved to Chicago in 1853. In 1853, the Gage brothers (Gage and his brother, David Allen Gage) acquired the lease of the Tremont House. The brothers operated the Tremont House the most popular hotel in the city. Together the brothers became prominent Chicago businessmen after running the Tremont House hotel and investing heavily in real estate.

In 1855, the Gage brothers were joined in their business partnership by John B. Drake. In 1862, David A. Gage left the partnership, and the firm was renamed "Gage & Drake".

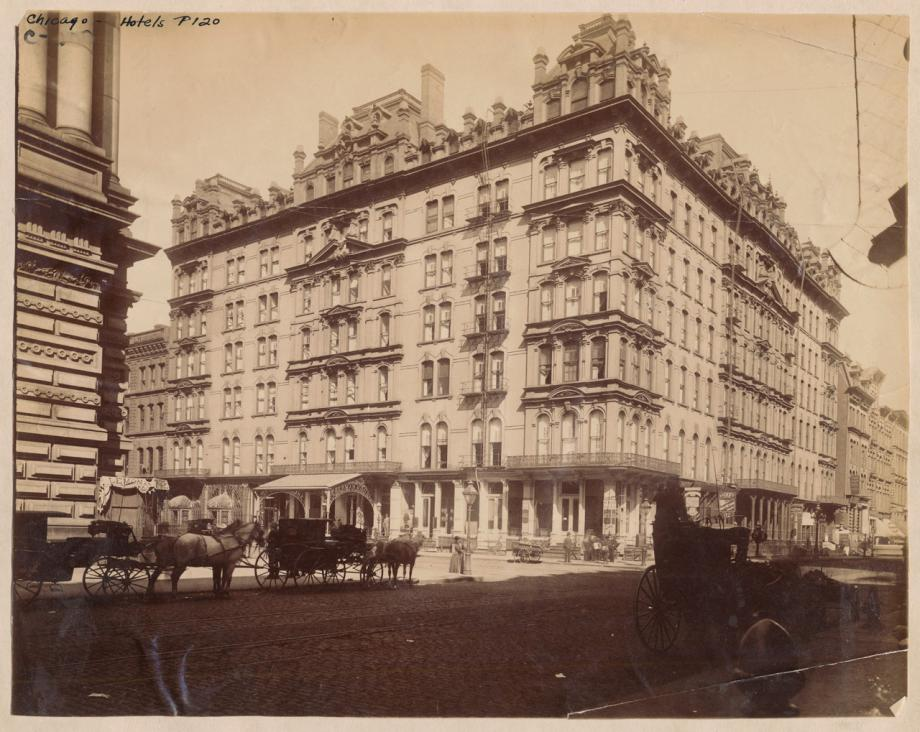
Gage operated the Sherman House Hotel

After success with the Tremont House, Gage began to also operate the equally-famous Sherman House Hotel, doing so until the Great Chicago Fire of 1871.

=== Baseball ===
The Chicago White Stockings had been disbanded following the Great Chicago Fire. On June 6, 1872, Gage was elected president of the "Chicago Base Ball Association," the corporate name of the White Stockings. The group intended to bring professional baseball back to Chicago. The White Stockings team was revived in 1874, and Gage served as president until his death 1875.

== Government and politics ==
Gage was a member of the Republican Party. He served as a Cook County delegate to the 1858 Illinois Republican state convention, and as an Illinois delegate to the 1864 Republican National Convention.

In 1862, Gage won election to a Cook County eat in the Illinois House of Representatives. He took office, but resigned after his opponent contested the outcome of the election after irregularities with the vote count were discovered.

From 1864–66, Gage served as a Chicago alderman (city councilman on the Chicago Common Council), representing the city's 1st ward.

Gage lost the 1869 Chicago mayoral election, in which he ran as the Republican nominee. Gage was later appointed a city park commissioner on the South Park Commission.

== Personal life and death ==
In 1844, Gage married Sarah H. Barker.

Gage died on September 24, 1875, after a short period of illness. His death was seen as a surprise. After Gage died in office as a commissioner of the South Park Commission, Gage Park on the city's southwest side, was named after him. The name of this park has extended to the surrounding neighborhood, which is now also known as Gage Park.

After his death, Gage was succeeded as president of the Chicago Base Ball Association by team secretary William Hulbert. Gage was survived by six children and his widow.

Party political offices
Preceded by John Blake Rice	Republican nominee for Mayor of Chicago; 1869	Succeeded by n/a
