= Charles Weber (baseball) =

Charles A. Weber was an executive who served as general manager of the Chicago Cubs.

The Cubs appointed Weber vice president before the 1938 season. Weber resigned as general manager after the 1940 season, but remained with the organization as vice president.
