= David Allen Gage =

Chicago City Treasurer
- In office 1870–1873
- Preceded by: William F. Wentworth
- Succeeded by: Daniel O'Hara
- In office 1863–1865
- Preceded by: W.H. Rice
- Succeeded by: Amos G. Throop

Personal details
- Born: June 30, 1822; New Hampshire
- Died: April 11, 1880 (aged 57); Charlestown, New Hampshire
- Relatives: George W. Gage (brother)
- Baseball career
- Chicago White Stockings President

Teams
- Chicago White Stockings (1870–1870)

David Allen Gage (June 30, 1822 – April 11, 1889) was an American baseball executive, president of the Chicago White Stockings in 1870.

New Hampshire-born David A. Gage, with his brother George W. Gage, were prominent Chicago businessmen in the mid-1800s. The brothers ran the Tremont Hotel, and invested heavily in real estate. David was partner in a firm that ran horse-drawn rail lines through the city.

In 1853, Gage and his brother George acquired the lease of the Tremont Hotel.

David served as city treasurer from 1863 to 1864, and 1870 to 1873. He was charged with perjury connected to malfeasance in office (shortage of funds) but was acquitted.

On Oct. 12, 1869, David Gage was elected treasurer of the Chicago base ball club at the meeting to organize a professional baseball team in Chicago. The team later was named the White Stockings. On January 15. 1870, the stockholders of the Chicago White Stockings baseball team elected Gage as president. Prominent Chicagoans had invested a large sum of their money to organize a professional baseball team in Chicago, but the new team, under the presidency of David Gage, seemed to be directionless. In mid-season, Gage was replaced by Col. Norman T. Gassette. The White Stockings went on a tear the remainder of the season, defeating their hated rivals the Cincinnati Red Stockings, and claiming the (unofficial) title of best team in the nation. David's brother George later became president of the White Stockings.
