= Dayton Moore =

American baseball executive

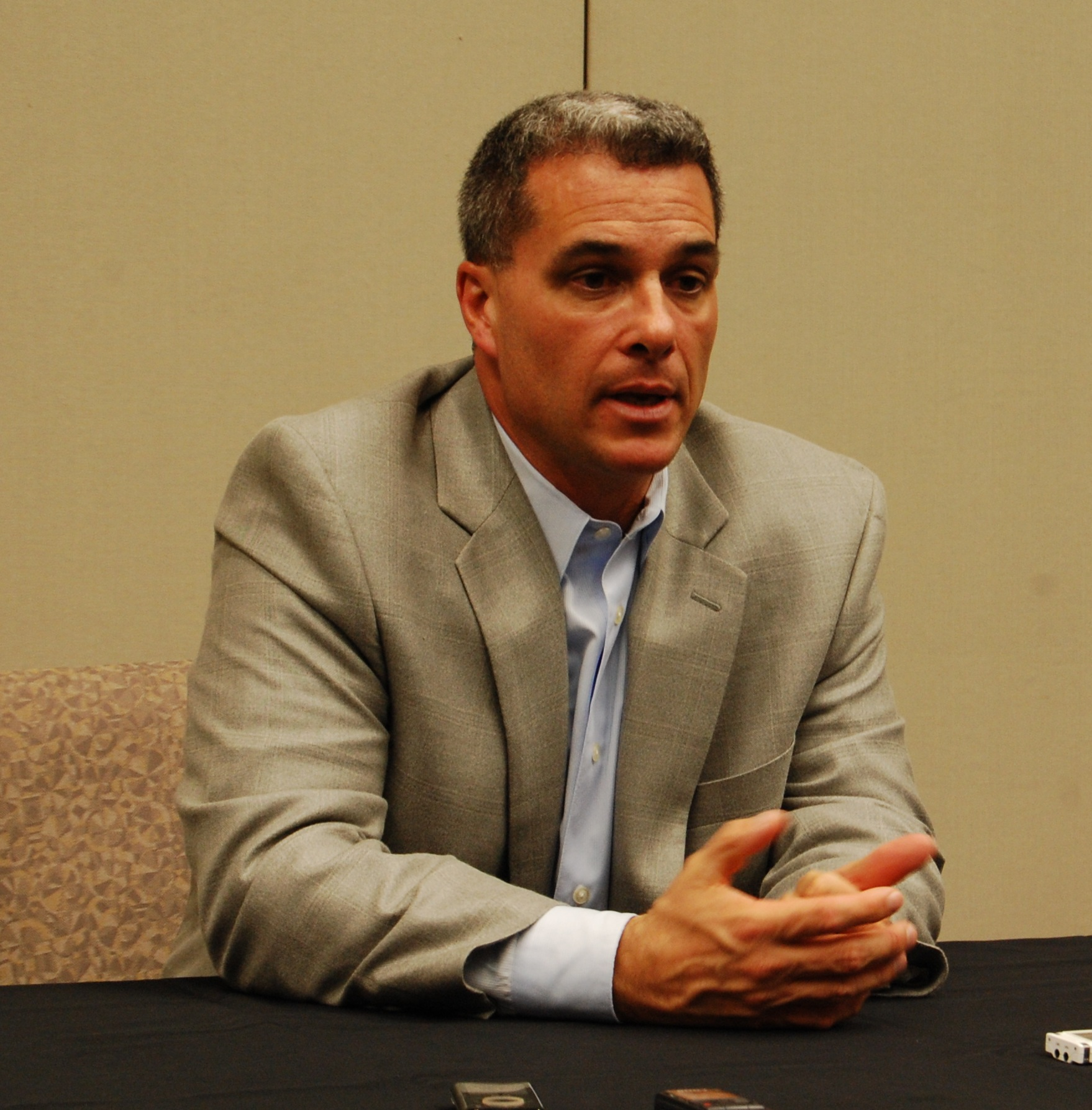
- Moore in 2011.

Texas Rangers
- General manager / Senior advisor of baseball operations
- Born: February 17, 1967 (age 59); Wichita, Kansas, U.S.

Teams
- As executive: Atlanta Braves (1994–2006); Kansas City Royals (2006–2022); Texas Rangers (2023–present); As general manager: Kansas City Royals (2006–2021)

Career highlights and awards
- 3× World Series champion (1995, 2015, 2023)

Dayton Moore (born February 17, 1967) is an American professional baseball executive who currently serves as the senior advisor of baseball operations for the Texas Rangers of Major League Baseball (MLB).

Moore's baseball career began as an assistant coach at George Mason University. He transitioned to professional baseball after being hired by the Atlanta Braves. There, Moore worked in the team's scouting department and was later promoted to the baseball operations department. In 2006, Moore was hired by the Kansas City Royals to fill a vacancy in their general manager position, replacing Allard Baird. Moore was the Royals' general manager (GM) during the team's appearances in the World Series of 2014 and 2015, being victorious in the latter. Moore served as Royals GM until the end of the 2021 season. In 2022, Moore was promoted and became the team's president of baseball operations. He was fired by the Royals later that season.

== Early life ==
Moore was born on February 17, 1967, in Wichita, Kansas. He played American Legion Baseball growing up in Moline, Illinois, and was part of the Moline team that was the runner-up in the Illinois state American Legion baseball tournament. A childhood Royals fan, Moore claims to have watched the 1985 World Series in Kansas City from Interstate 70. He played baseball at Garden City Community College before graduating from George Mason University in 1989, with an undergraduate degree in Physical Education and Health. Moore received a master's degree in Athletic Administration from George Mason in 1992, and served as an assistant baseball coach at the university from 1990 to 1994. He also served as the manager of the Winchester Royals of the Valley Baseball League during the summers of 1992 and 1993.

== Career ==
In 1994, Moore entered Major League Baseball, joining the Atlanta Braves as a scout. He was assistant director of scouting, assistant director of player development, and director of international scouting before his 2002 promotion to director of player personnel development. He took over as the Braves' assistant general manager in August 2005. In 2005, Moore interviewed with the Boston Red Sox for GM, but did not get the job. The Kansas City Royals hired Moore as general manager on June 8, 2006, replacing Allard Baird.

On August 31, 2009, Moore's contract as general manager of the Royals was extended through 2014. In December 2010, Moore traded Zack Greinke, who had previously won the Cy Young Award for the Royals, and Yuniesky Betancourt to the Milwaukee Brewers in exchange for a group of players including Alcides Escobar and Lorenzo Cain. After a 2013 season that saw the Royals post their best record since 1994, Moore's contract was extended to continue through the 2016 season. The Royals built upon the success of the 2013 team by reaching the World Series in both 2014 and 2015. He was awarded the league Best Executive Award after the 2015 season. Moore's trade of Greinke is considered to have provided the foundation of the Royals run of success and both Cain and Escobar became important contributors for the Royals. Another Moore trade, this one sending Wil Myers and several other players to the Tampa Bay Rays for James Shields and Wade Davis in 2012 provided important pieces for the Royals' two World Series teams (although Shields left in free agency after the 2014 season).

After the Royals' World Series win, Moore signed another contract extension to remain with the team longer. In June 2018, Moore generated backlash with comments he made about convicted child molester and Oregon State University pitching prospect Luke Heimlich, saying, "I think the player has earned the opportunity to play professional baseball." In late 2019, Royals owner David Glass sold the team to businessman John Sherman, who retained Moore as general manager. In September 2021, Moore was promoted to president of baseball operations, with J. J. Picollo named general manager. In September 2022, Moore was dismissed by Sherman, as the Royals were 59-89 on the year and had not had a winning season since 2015.

On November 23, 2022, he was appointed senior advisor of baseball operations by the Texas Rangers.

== Personal life ==
Moore is a Christian, and is open about his spiritual beliefs. He has taken a hard stance against pornography and held an anti-porn seminar for the Royals team in 2018. Moore and his wife and three children live in Leawood, Kansas. Their son Robert played NCAA baseball for the University of Arkansas, and was drafted by the Milwaukee Brewers in the 2022 Major League Baseball draft.

Moore is also the author of the book "More Than a Season", which describes his part in the Royals' success from a losing team to the 2014 World Series. He also founded an organization known as "C" You in the Major Leagues.

In 2025 Moore publicly floated the possibility of running for governor of Kansas as a Republican, before ruling it out early into 2026.

Preceded by Allard Baird	Kansas City Royals General Manager; 2006–2021	Succeeded by J.J. Picollo
