= John Sherman (businessman) =

American businessman (born 1955)

- Born: April 12, 1955 (age 71); Japan
- Education: Ottawa University
- Occupation: Businessman
- Known for: Owner of the Kansas City Royals

John J. Sherman (born April 12, 1955) is an American businessman. He is the majority owner of the Kansas City Royals of Major League Baseball (MLB). Sherman is founder and former chairman and chief executive officer of Inergy, L.P.

== Early life ==
Sherman was born in Japan in 1955, where his father served in the United States Air Force. He was the oldest of seven children. He graduated from Ottawa University, where he played as a quarterback for the Ottawa Braves football team.

== Career ==
Sherman began his business career in telecommunications before shifting to energy. He founded LPG Services Group, which later merged with Dynegy. In 1996, Sherman founded Inergy. It merged with Crestwood Holdings in 2013, reporting an enterprise value of $8 billion. He divested control of the company in 2014.

Sherman bought a minority share of the Cleveland Indians in 2016, and became their vice chairman.

=== Kansas City Royals ownership ===
On August 30, 2019, Kansas City Royals owner David Glass announced his intention to sell the franchise to Sherman at a reported price of over $1 billion. MLB and its owners approved the purchase on November 21. During the COVID-19 pandemic, he did not lay off or furlough any employees. In September 2021, Sherman promoted then-general manager Dayton Moore to president of baseball operations and J. J. Picollo to general manager. He fired Moore in September 2022.

Since purchasing the team, Sherman has planned to either relocate or replace the team's stadium. As of 2023, the options were to replace the Kauffman stadium in Jackson County or build a new stadium in Clay County. Under Sherman's proposed plans in September 2023, the new stadiums would cost $2 billion, with Sherman expecting taxpayers to pay for half of those costs. However, according to a financial analysis by Jackson County of the plans, the cost to taxpayers would drastically exceed those claimed by Sherman. The analysis found that taxpayers would shoulder $4.4 billion to $6.4 billion.

== Personal life ==
Sherman and his wife, Marny, have been married for over 40 years. Their first date was at a Royals game. They have four children.
