= Ned Yost =

American baseball player and manager (born 1954)

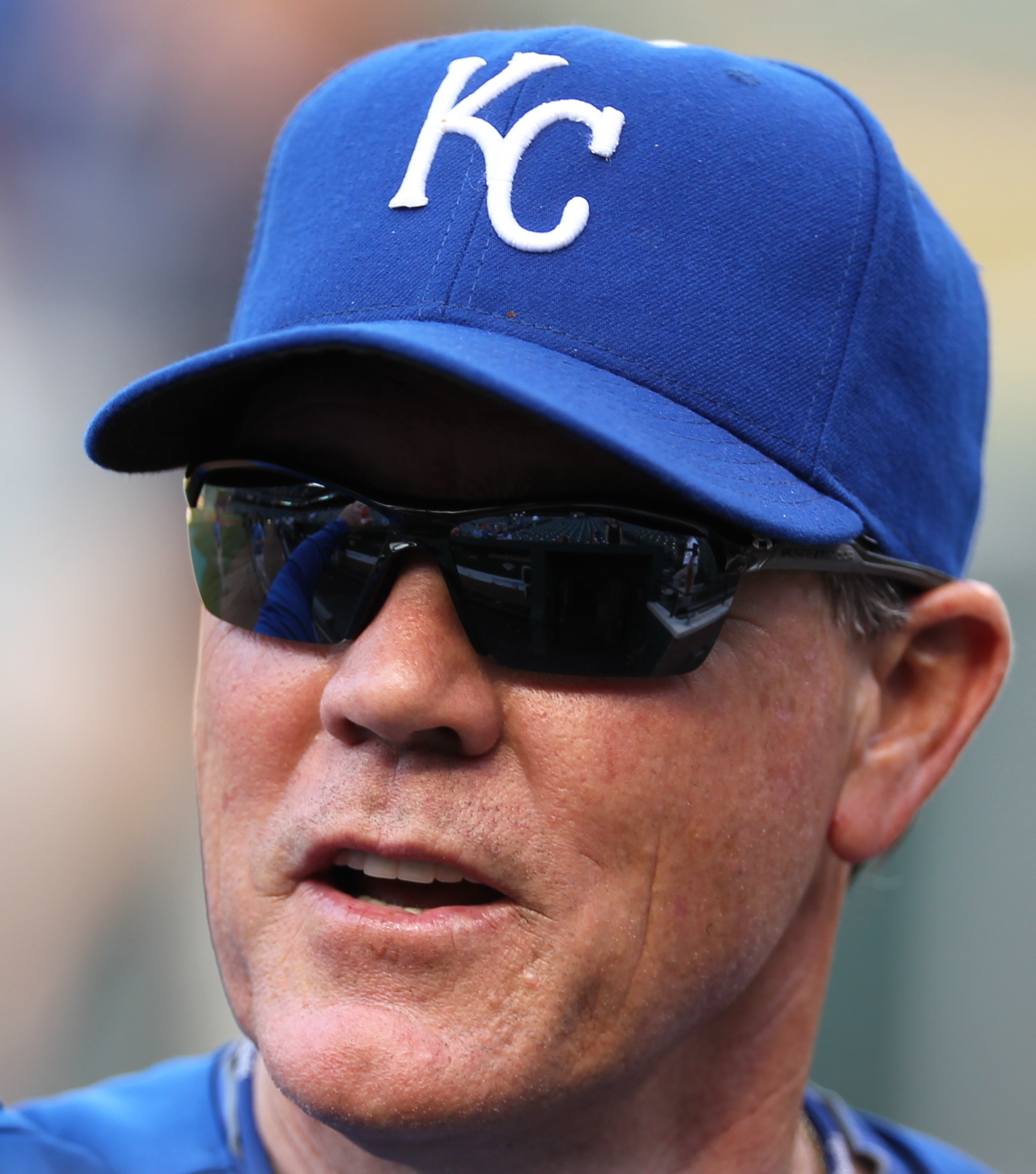
- Yost with the Kansas City Royals in 2011
- Catcher / Manager
- Born: August 19, 1954 (age 71); Eureka, California, U.S.
- Batted: Right Threw: Right

MLB debut
- April 12, 1980, for the Milwaukee Brewers

Last MLB appearance
- October 6, 1985, for the Montreal Expos

MLB statistics
- Batting average: .212
- Home runs: 16
- Runs batted in: 64
- Managerial record: 1,203–1,341
- Winning %: .473
- Stats at Baseball Reference
- Managerial record at Baseball Reference

Teams
- As player: Milwaukee Brewers (1980–1983); Texas Rangers (1984); Montreal Expos (1985); As manager: Milwaukee Brewers (2003–2008); Kansas City Royals (2010–2019); As coach: Atlanta Braves (1991–2002)

Career highlights and awards
- 2× World Series champion (1995, 2015); Kansas City Royals Hall of Fame

Edgar Frederick Yost III (/ˈjoʊst/; born August 19, 1954) is an American former Major League Baseball (MLB) catcher and manager of the Milwaukee Brewers and Kansas City Royals. He played for the Brewers, Texas Rangers, and Montreal Expos. Since 2025, he has served as a senior advisor to Royals general manager J. J. Picollo.

== Early life ==
Yost was born on California's North Coast in Eureka. Yost attended and played baseball at Dublin High School in Dublin, California. He had significant difficulty hitting prior to his junior and senior years, yet improved after building physical strength by working as a pot-scrubber at a Kentucky Fried Chicken restaurant. After high school, Yost attended Chabot Junior College in Hayward, California, where he walked on to Chabot's baseball team after receiving no offers to play for other schools.

== Playing career ==
Yost was selected twice in the 1974 MLB draft, first by the Montreal Expos in the second round (33rd overall) in January, but he signed his first professional contract with the New York Mets which picked him in the first round (7th overall) of the June secondary phase. He went to the Brewers in the Rule 5 draft on December 5, 1977.

Yost, as a player, was used primarily as a backup catcher for the Brewers from 1980 to 1983 (which included the 1982 World Series), and then spent a year with the Texas Rangers (1984; he played a career-high 80 games with the Rangers, hitting .182) and played 5 games for the Montreal Expos (1985) before retiring.

He never had more than 242 at bats in a season. He ended his career with a .212 batting average, and .237 on-base percentage, in 605 at bats. He had a .982 fielding percentage (the league average was .987).

Yost briefly had a second career as a taxidermist in Jackson, Mississippi, in between his playing days and coaching days.

== Coaching career ==
After a brief stint managing in the minors, Yost joined the Atlanta Braves organization. He was the Braves' bullpen coach from 1991 to 1998 and earned a ring as a part of the 1995 World Series championship team that defeated the Cleveland Indians in six games. He also was part of the 1991, 1992, 1996, and 1999 National League pennant-winning teams that lost the World Series to the Minnesota Twins (1991), the Toronto Blue Jays (1992), and the New York Yankees (1996, 1999) respectively. In 1999 Yost became the Braves' third base coach, a position he maintained until the end of the 2002 season.

On February 11, 2025, the Kansas City Royals hired Yost to serve as a senior advisor to general manager J. J. Picollo.

== Managing career ==
=== Milwaukee Brewers ===
On October 29, 2002, Yost was named the Brewers manager, succeeding Jerry Royster. National League manager Tony La Russa named Yost to be part of his coaching staff for the 2005 MLB All-Star Game.

Yost's tenure oversaw a revitalization of the Brewers franchise, leading them from losing records to championship contender. However, his teams were plagued by inconsistency, most notably squandering a large lead in the division during the 2007 season and a significant advantage in the wild card race in 2008. Yost finished seventh in voting for Manager of the Year in 2007. While he wore No. 5 on his jersey as a player with the Brewers, as a manager, he wore No. 3 on his jersey as a tribute to his close friend, deceased NASCAR racer and baseball fan Dale Earnhardt.

Yost's managing came under fire late in 2007. During the season, the Brewers held an 8 1/2 game division lead over the Cubs by June 23 but failed to hold on to the advantage, finishing two games behind the Cubs. Yost's bullpen management, lineup strategies, and bench management were blamed. He also was thrown out of three games in the last week of the season. However, general manager Doug Melvin announced Yost's return for the 2008 season.

He was fired as manager on September 15, 2008, with twelve games remaining in the regular season. The Brewers were still in the playoff race, but had lost eleven of their last fourteen games. Yost finished his Brewers career with a 457–502 record. Third-base coach Dale Sveum was named his interim replacement and served until the end of the season, leading the Brewers to clinch the wild card spot on the last day of the season for their first trip to the postseason since 1982 when they made it to the World Series. They were eliminated by the Phillies, the eventual World Series champions, in the 2008 National League Division Series in four games.

Following the 2009 season, Yost was a candidate to be the next manager of the Houston Astros, however the position was filled by Brad Mills.

=== Kansas City Royals ===
On May 13, 2010, Yost was named manager of the Kansas City Royals, replacing Trey Hillman. Prior to the 2012 season, the Royals signed Yost to a contract extension through the 2013 season. In the 2013 season, Yost posted an 86–76 record with the Royals, their first winning season since 2003.

In 2014, Yost led the Royals to their first playoff berth since 1985, finishing 89–73. Yost's Royals swept the Baltimore Orioles in four games in the American League Championship Series to give the team its first American League pennant in 29 years. In doing so, the team became the first team in MLB history to win their first eight consecutive playoff games. The Royals were then defeated in seven games in the 2014 World Series by the San Francisco Giants. Yost finished third in the voting for 2014 Manager of the Year and signed a one-year contract extension in the offseason to stay with the club through 2016.

At the start of the 2015 season, Yost led the team to a 7–0 start marking the second best start to a season in team history after 2003 (which saw the Royals win their first nine games). In his fifth full season as manager, Yost became the longest-tenured manager in Royals history. He later also became the winningest manager in Royals club history after a 3–2 win over the Milwaukee Brewers on June 18, 2015. On the final day of the 2015 regular season, Yost's Royals clinched the best record in the American League at 95–67, giving Kansas City home field advantage throughout the playoffs, including the World Series by virtue of the AL's victory in the All-Star Game. The Royals defeated the Houston Astros, Toronto Blue Jays and ultimately the New York Mets to bring Kansas City its first World Series championship since 1985, and Yost his first title as a manager.

On August 18, 2015, MLB gave Yost a warning about using an Apple Watch he received from the MLB because of MLB's policy of no internet enabled devices in the dugout during gametime. Yost received the watch as a present from MLB for winning the 2014 AL pennant. Yost later told a local radio station that MLB had rescinded the warning after learning that the networking features of the Apple Watch were only available with an active iPhone connection.

Yost has often been criticized for his idiosyncratic decision-making and rejection of Sabermetrics, such as with the arrangement of his batting order and bullpen management, but he also has defended his methods as ones needed to give the team confidence in their ability; Yost was once quoted as saying "I’ve been known as a dope my whole life. And I took a team to the World Series that hadn’t been to the playoffs in 29 years. And now everyone knows them. And I’m still a big dope. But it doesn’t matter. What does it matter?’’

On February 18, 2016, the Royals announced that Yost had signed an extension with the team, keeping him as manager through the 2018 season.

On September 17, 2016, Yost earned the 1,000th victory of his managerial career, in the Royals' 3–2 victory over the Chicago White Sox. In 2016, he was successful on a higher percentage of replay challenges than any other MLB manager with ten or more challenges, at 67.6%.

In 2018 he was successful on a higher percentage of replay challenges than any other MLB manager with 10 or more challenges, at 75.6%.

On September 23, 2019, Yost announced that he would retire at the end of the 2019 season. He finished his Royals career with 746 wins and 839 losses, both being franchise records for a manager in Royals history.

=== Managerial record ===
As of games played on September 25, 2019.

Team	Year	Regular season					Postseason			
Team	Year	Games	Won	Lost	Win %	Finish	Won	Lost	Win %	Result
MIL	2003	162	68	94	.420	6th in NL Central	–	–	–	
MIL	2004	161	67	94	.416	6th in NL Central	–	–	–	
MIL	2005	162	81	81	.500	3rd in NL Central	–	–	–	
MIL	2006	162	75	87	.463	4th in NL Central	–	–	–	
MIL	2007	162	83	79	.512	2nd in NL Central	–	–	–	
MIL	2008	150	83	67	.553	Fired	–	–	–	
MIL total		959	457	502	.477		–	–	–	
KC	2010	127	55	72	.433	5th in AL Central	–	–	–	
KC	2011	162	71	91	.438	4th in AL Central	–	–	–	
KC	2012	162	72	90	.444	3rd in AL Central	–	–	–	
KC	2013	162	86	76	.531	3rd in AL Central	–	–	–	
KC	2014	162	89	73	.549	2nd in AL Central	11	4	.733	Lost World Series (SF)
KC	2015	162	95	67	.586	1st in AL Central	11	5	.688	Won World Series (NYM)
KC	2016	162	81	81	.500	3rd in AL Central	–	–	–	
KC	2017	162	80	82	.494	3rd in AL Central	–	–	–	
KC	2018	162	58	104	.358	5th in AL Central	–	–	–	
KC	2019	162	59	103	.364	4th in AL Central	–	–	–	
KC total		1585	746	839	.471		22	9	.710	
Total		2544	1203	1341	.473		22	9	.710	

== Personal life ==
Yost and his wife, Deborah, have four children and live in rural Georgia during the off-season. One of his sons, Ned Yost IV, serves as a coach for the Nashville Sounds, Class AAA minor league affiliate of the Milwaukee Brewers. Prior to becoming a coach in 2009, the younger Yost played first base for the Class-A Brevard County Manatees in 2007, his third season in the minors, hitting .248 with a .283 slugging percentage.

On November 4, 2017, Yost was in a tree stand near his home in Georgia when he fell twenty feet. He sustained a broken pelvis, and his surgeon was concerned that Yost might die from blood loss. Yost later said he was certain he would have died if he did not have his cell phone at the time of the fall. He later appeared in a television commercial for Verizon, crediting its wireless service with saving his life.

Ned Yost was a close friend with NASCAR driver Dale Earnhardt. During the 1994–95 Major League Baseball strike, Yost went to work with Earnhardt’s crew for the rest of the season as a “hydration specialist”. Earnhardt went on to win his record tying 7th NASCAR Championship that year and Yost was present when it happened. Yost credits Earnhardt on his abilities to win as a manager and after his death, Yost switched to number 3 as his number with the Brewers and Royals.

== See also ==
- List of Major League Baseball managers with most career wins
