= Kansas City Royals =

Major League Baseball franchise in Kansas City

- 2026 Kansas City Royals season

Logo	Cap insignia
- Established in 1969

Major league affiliations
- American League (1969–present); Central Division (1994–present); West Division (1969–1993)

Current uniform
- Retired numbers: 5; 10; 20; 42

Colors
- Royal blue, gold, powder blue, white

Name
- Kansas City Royals (1969–present)

Nicknames
- The Blue Crew; Boys In Blue; The Crowns

Ballpark
- Kauffman Stadium (1973–present); Municipal Stadium (1969–1972)

Major league titles
- World Series titles (2): 1985; 2015
- AL pennants (4): 1980; 1985; 2014; 2015
- AL Central division titles (1): 2015
- AL West division titles (6): 1976; 1977; 1978; 1980; 1984; 1985
- Wild card berths (2): 2014; 2024

Front office
- Principal owner: John Sherman
- President: R. Brooks Sherman Jr. (President of Business Operations)
- President of baseball operations: J. J. Picollo
- General manager: J. J. Picollo
- Manager: Matt Quatraro
- Website: mlb.com/royals

The Kansas City Royals are an American professional baseball team based in Kansas City, Missouri. The Royals compete in Major League Baseball (MLB) as a member club of the American League (AL) Central Division. The team was founded as an expansion franchise in 1969, and have made four World Series trips, winning in 1985 and 2015, and losing in 1980 and 2014.

The name "Royals" pays homage to the American Royal, a livestock show, horse show, rodeo, and championship barbecue competition held annually in Kansas City since 1899, as well as the identical names of two former Negro league baseball teams that played in the first half of the 20th century (one was a semi-pro team based in Kansas City in the 1910s and 1920s that toured the Midwest and the other was a California Winter League team based in Los Angeles in the 1940s that was managed by Chet Brewer and included Satchel Paige and Jackie Robinson on its roster). The Los Angeles team had personnel connections to the Monarchs but could not use the Monarchs name. The name also fits into something of a theme for other professional sports franchises in the city, including the Kansas City Chiefs of the NFL, the former Kansas City Kings of the NBA, and the former Kansas City Monarchs of the Negro National League.

Entering the American League in 1969 along with the Seattle Pilots, the club was founded by Kansas City businessman Ewing Kauffman. The franchise was established following the actions of Stuart Symington, then-U.S. Senator from Missouri, who demanded a new franchise for the city after the Athletics (Kansas City's previous major league team that played from 1955 to 1967) moved to Oakland, California, in 1968. Since April 10, 1973, the Royals have played at Kauffman Stadium, formerly known as Royals Stadium.

The new team quickly became a powerhouse, appearing in the playoffs seven times from 1976 to 1985, winning one World Series championship and another AL pennant, led by stars such as Amos Otis, Hal McRae, John Mayberry, George Brett, Frank White, Willie Wilson, and Bret Saberhagen. The team remained competitive throughout the early 1990s, but then had only one winning season (2003) from 1995 to 2012. For 28 consecutive seasons (1986–2013), the Royals did not qualify to play in the MLB postseason, one of the longest postseason droughts during baseball's current wild-card era. The team broke this streak in 2014 by securing the franchise's first wild card berth and advancing to the 2014 World Series, where they lost to the San Francisco Giants in seven games. The Royals, led by players like Salvador Perez, Alex Gordon, Johnny Cueto, Danny Duffy, Eric Hosmer, Mike Moustakas, Lorenzo Cain, and an elite group of bullpen pitchers highlighted by Wade Davis, Kelvin Herrera, and Greg Holland, followed this up by winning the team's first AL Central division title in 2015 and defeating the New York Mets in five games in the 2015 World Series to win their second World Series championship.

From 1969 to 2025, the Royals have an all time win–loss record of 4,290–4,703–2 (.477). Entering the 2023 season, the team is valued at US$1.2 billion, placing them 27th out of MLB's 30 teams. Since 2019, the team has been owned by majority owner John Sherman, amongst many other Kansas City business owners and entrepreneurs.

== Franchise history ==
=== Baseball returns to Kansas City ===
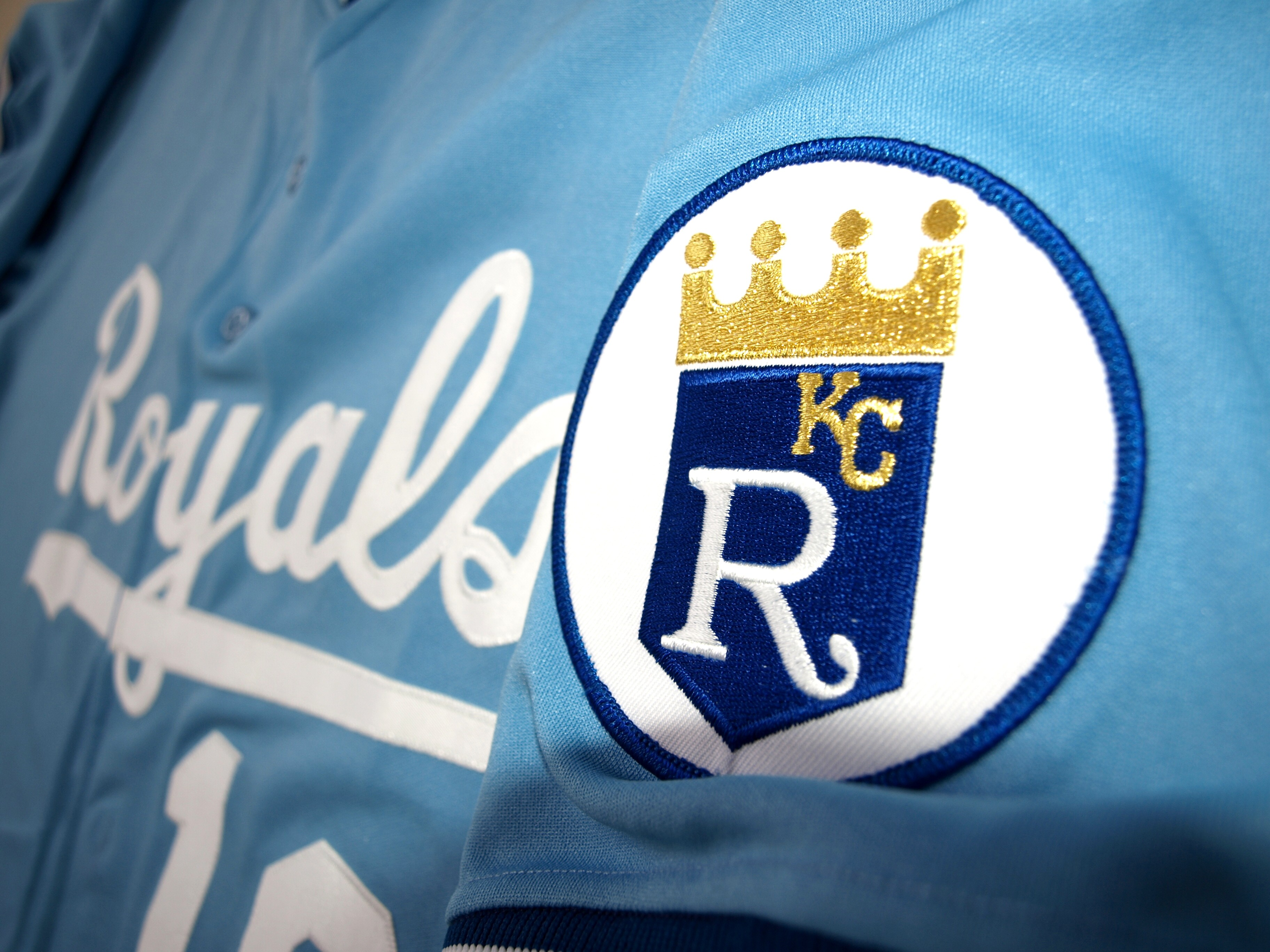
The Royals wore their trademark powder blue road uniforms from 1973 to 1991, and reintroduced it in 2008 as an alternate jersey.

When the Kansas City Athletics moved to Oakland after the 1967 season, Kansas City was left without major league baseball or, for the first time since 1883, professional baseball at all. The team was led by Charlie Finley, who explored many elaborate relocation plans and essentially shunned Kansas City before the team even relocated. An enraged Senator Stuart Symington of Missouri threatened to introduce legislation removing baseball's antitrust exemption unless Kansas City was granted a team in the next round of expansion. Major League Baseball complied with a hasty round of expansion at the 1967 winter meetings. Kansas City was awarded one of four teams to begin play in 1971. However, Symington was not satisfied with having Kansas City wait three years for baseball to return, and pressured MLB to allow the new teams to start play in 1969. Symington's intervention may have contributed to the financial collapse of the Royals' companion expansion team, the Seattle Pilots, who had to begin play in 1969 before they were ready (the league required new franchises to enter in pairs to preserve symmetry for scheduling purposes).

Pharmaceutical executive Ewing Kauffman won the bidding for the new Kansas City team. He conducted a contest to determine the best and most appropriate name for the new franchise. Sanford Porte from Overland Park, Kansas submitted the name Royals, in recognition of Missouri's billion-dollar livestock industry. His suggestion was that the American Royal best exemplified Kansas City through its pageantry and parade, so the new team should be named the Royals. The name was selected out of 17,000 submissions and the Royals Board voted 6–1 to adopt the name. The one dissenting vote was Kauffman's. He eventually changed his mind after the name grew on him. (Some sources say it was in honor of the Kansas City Monarchs, a Negro leagues team.) The team's logo, a crown atop a shield with the letters "KC" inside the shield, was created by Shannon Manning, an artist at Hallmark Cards, based in Kansas City.

=== 1969–1979: Taking off ===
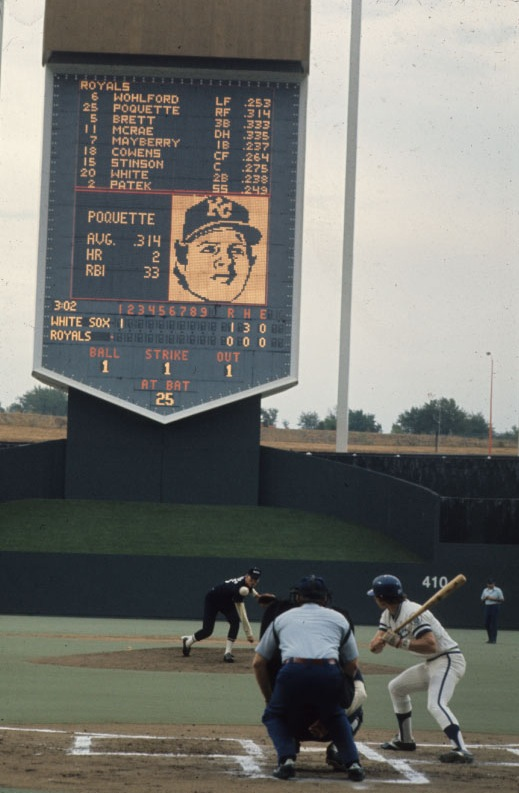
A game versus the Chicago White Sox at Royals Stadium (now Kauffman Stadium), September 19, 1976

The Royals began play in 1969 in Kansas City, Missouri. In their inaugural game on April 8 at Municpal Stadium, they defeated the Minnesota Twins 4–3 in 12 innings. The Royals went 69–93 (.426) in their first season, highlighted by Lou Piniella, who won the AL Rookie of the Year Award.

The team was quickly built through a number of trades engineered by its first general manager, Cedric Tallis, who picked up center fielder Amos Otis, who became the team's first star, first baseman John Mayberry, who provided power, second baseman Cookie Rojas, shortstop Fred Patek, and designated hitter Hal McRae. The Royals also invested in a strong farm system and developed future star pitchers Paul Splittorff, Dennis Leonard, and Steve Busby, infielders George Brett and Frank White, and outfielder Al Cowens. Under these young players, the Royals built a core set up for future success.

In 1971, the Royals had their first winning season, with manager Bob Lemon leading them to a second-place finish. In 1973 under manager Jack McKeon, the Royals adopted their iconic "powder blue" road uniforms and moved from Municipal Stadium to the brand-new Royals Stadium (now Kauffman Stadium).

The 1973 All-Star Game was hosted at Royals Stadium, with Otis and Mayberry in the AL starting lineup. The event was previously held at Municipal Stadium in 1960, when the Athletics were based in Kansas City.

Manager Whitey Herzog replaced McKeon in 1975, and the Royals quickly became the dominant franchise in the American League's Western Division. After a runner-up 91-win season in 1975, they won three straight division championships from 1976 to 1978, including the franchise's only 100-win season in 1977. However, the Royals lost to the New York Yankees in three straight American League Championship Series encounters.

=== 1980–1984: From pennant to Pine Tar Incident ===
After the Royals finished in second place in 1979, Herzog was fired and replaced by Jim Frey. Under Frey and a legendary .390 season from George Brett, the Royals rebounded in 1980 and advanced to the ALCS, where they again faced the Yankees. The Royals vanquished the Yankees in a three-game sweep punctuated by Brett's home run off of Yankees' star relief pitcher Goose Gossage. After reaching their first World Series, the Royals fell to the Philadelphia Phillies in six games. Game 6 was also significant because it remains the most-watched game in World Series history with a television audience of 54.9 million viewers.

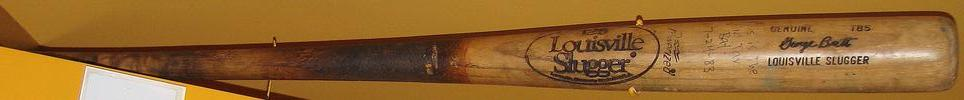
The baseball bat used by third baseman George Brett in the "Pine Tar Incident" on July 24, 1983, versus the New York Yankees

In July 1983, while the Royals were headed for a second-place finish behind the Chicago White Sox another chapter in the team's rivalry with the New York Yankees occurred. In what has come to be known as "the Pine Tar Incident", umpires discovered illegal placement of pine tar (more than 18 inches up the handle) on third baseman George Brett's bat after he had hit a two-run home run off Gossage that put the Royals up 5–4 in the top of the 9th. After Yankee Manager Billy Martin came out of the dugout to talk to home plate umpire Tim McClelland, McClelland and the other umpires mulled over the bat (measuring it over home plate, touching it, etc.). McClelland then pointed to Brett in the dugout and gave the "out" sign, disallowing the home run. Enraged, Brett stormed out of the dugout toward McClelland and Martin, and McClelland ejected Brett. The homer was later reinstated by AL President Lee MacPhail, and the Royals won the game after it was resumed several weeks later.

The 1983 season was also notable for some transitional changes in the Royals organization. First, owner Ewing Kauffman sold 49% of his interest to Memphis developer Avron Fogelman. Second, John Schuerholz was named general manager. Schuerholz soon bolstered the farm system with pitchers Bud Black, Danny Jackson, Mark Gubicza, David Cone, and Bret Saberhagen, as well as hitters such as Kevin Seitzer.

Thanks to the maturation of most of the aforementioned players, the Royals won their fifth division championship in 1984, relying on Brett's bat and the young pitching staff of Saberhagen, Gubicza, Charlie Leibrandt, Black and Jackson. The Royals were then swept by the Detroit Tigers in the American League Championship Series. The Tigers went on to win the World Series.

=== 1985: "The I-70 Series" ===
In the 1985 regular season the Royals topped the Western Division for the sixth time in ten years, led by Bret Saberhagen's Cy Young Award-winning performance and George Brett's self-described best "all around year." Throughout the ensuing playoffs, the Royals incurred both a 2-0 and a 3–1 series deficit in both rounds of the playoffs, but always managed to claw their way back into the series. In game three of the American League Championship Series, with KC down 2 games to 0, George Brett homered twice and doubled off the fence in right field to put Kansas City back into the series. With the Royals down three games to one in the American League Championship Series against the Toronto Blue Jays, the Royals eventually rallied to win the series 4–3, highlighted by a go-ahead 3-run triple from Jim Sundberg against Blue Jay's ace Dave Stieb in Game 7.

==== 1985 World Series ====
In the 1985 World Series (nicknamed the "I-70 Series" because the two teams are both located in the state of Missouri and connected by Interstate 70) against the cross-state St. Louis Cardinals, the Royals again fell behind, three games to one. After Danny Jackson pitched the Royals to a 6–1 win in game five, the Cardinals and Royals headed back to Kansas City for game six. Facing elimination, the Royals trailed 1–0 in the bottom of the 9th inning, when Jorge Orta led off, hitting a bouncing ground ball to Cardinals 1st basemen Jack Clark, who flipped the ball back to pitcher Todd Worrell at first base. The ball beat Orta to the bag, but umpire Don Denkinger called him safe, and following a dropped popup by Clark and a passed ball, the Royals rallied to score two runs, winning on a walk-off single from pinch hitter Dane Iorg to send the series to game seven. In game seven Bret Saberhagen shutout the Cardinals as Kansas City dominated the Cardinals 11–0, clinching their first title in franchise history.

=== 1986–1994: Staying in the picture ===
The Royals maintained a reputation as one of the American League West's top teams throughout the late 1980s. The club posted a winning record in three of the four seasons following its 1985 World Series championship, while developing young stars such as Bo Jackson, Tom Gordon, and Kevin Seitzer. The Royals finished the 1989 season with a 92–70 record (third-best in the major leagues) but did not qualify for the playoffs, finishing second in their division behind the eventual World Series champion Oakland Athletics.

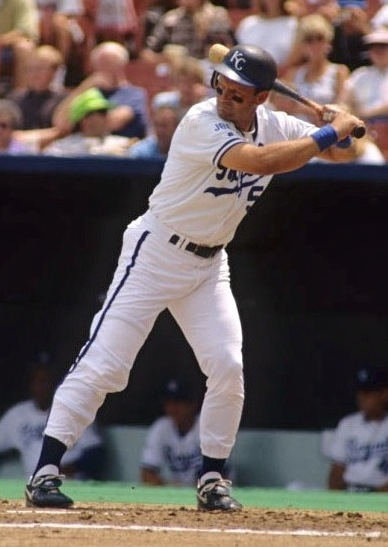
George Brett bats during a 1990 game at Kauffman Stadium (then Royals Stadium).

At the end of the 1989 season, the team boasted a powerhouse pitching rotation, including the AL Cy Young Award-winner Bret Saberhagen (who set franchise record 23 wins that year), two-time All-Star Mark Gubicza (a 15-game winner in 1989) and 1989 AL Rookie of the Year runner-up Tom Gordon (who won 17 games that year). But the organization felt it was still missing a few necessary pieces to give its divisional rival Oakland Athletics a run for their money. So prior to the 1990 season, the Royals acquired Mark Davis, the 1989 National League Cy Young Award-winner and league leader in saves, signing him to a 4-year, $13 million contract (the largest annual salary in baseball history at the time). The Royals also signed starting pitcher Storm Davis, who was coming off a career-high 19-game win season (third-best in the AL), to a three-year $6 million contract. Despite the promising off-season moves, the team suffered critical bullpen injuries while both newly signed Davises experienced lackluster seasons in 1990. The Royals concluded the season with a 75–86 record, in second-to-last place in the AL West (and with the worst franchise record since 1970). Bo Jackson—the team's potential future franchise player—suffered a devastating hip injury while playing football in the off-season, so the Royals waived him during spring training in 1991.

Though the team dropped out of contention from 1990 to 1992, the Royals still could generally be counted on to post winning records through the strike-shortened 1994 season. With no playoff appearances despite the winning records during this era, many of the team's highlights instead centered around the end of George Brett's career, such as his third and final batting title in 1990—which made him the first player to win batting titles in three different decades—and his 3,000th hit.

In 1994, the Royals moved from the AL West to the newly created AL Central along with the Chicago White Sox and Minnesota Twins, joined by the Cleveland Indians and Milwaukee Brewers from the AL East. The Brewers left for the NL Central in 1998, replaced by the Detroit Tigers that moved from the AL East.

=== 1995–2002: Decline in the post-Kauffman era ===
At the start of the 1990s, the Royals had been hit with a double-whammy when General Manager John Schuerholz departed in 1990 and team owner Ewing Kauffman died in 1993. Shortly before Kauffman's death, he set up an unprecedented complex succession plan to keep the team in Kansas City. The team was donated at his death to the Greater Kansas City Community Foundation and Affiliated Trusts with operating decisions of the team decided by a five-member group chaired by Wal-Mart executive David Glass. According to the plan the Royals had six years to find a local owner for the team before opening ownership to an outside bidder. The new owners would be required to say they would keep the team in Kansas City. Kauffman had feared that new owners would move it noting, "No one would want to buy a baseball team that consistently loses millions of dollars and had little prospect of making money because it was in a small city." If no owner could be found the Kauffman restrictions were to end on January 1, 2002, and the team was to be sold to the highest bidder. In 1999, New York City lawyer and minor league baseball owner Miles Prentice, vowing not to move the team, bid $75 million for the team. This was the minimum amount Kauffman had stipulated the team could be sold for. MLB rejected Prentice's first bid without specifying any reason. In a final round of bids on March 13, 2000, the Foundation voted to accept Glass' bid of $96 million, rejecting Prentice's revised bid of $115 million.

During the interregnum under Foundation ownership, the team declined. In the 1994 season, the Royals reduced payroll by trading pitcher David Cone and outfielder Brian McRae, then continued their salary dump in the 1995 season. The team payroll, which had previously remained among the league's highest, was sliced in half from $40.5 million in 1994 (fourth-highest in the major leagues) to $18.5 million in 1996 (second-lowest in the major leagues).

As attendance slid and the average MLB salary continued to rise, rather than pay higher salaries or lose their players to free agency, the Royals traded their remaining stars such as Kevin Appier, Johnny Damon and Jermaine Dye. By 1999, the team's payroll had fallen again to $16.5 million. Making matters worse, most of the younger players that the Royals received in exchange for these All-Stars proved of little value, setting the stage for an extended downward spiral. Indeed, the Royals set a franchise-low with a .398 winning percentage (64–97 record) in 1999, and lost 97 games again in 2001.

In the middle of this era, in 1997, the Royals declined the opportunity to switch to the National League as part of a realignment plan to introduce the Arizona Diamondbacks and Tampa Bay Devil Rays as expansion teams. The Milwaukee Brewers made the switch instead.

In 2002, the Royals set a new team record for futility, losing 100 games for the first time in franchise history. They fired manager Tony Muser, and he was replaced by Tony Peña.

=== 2003: A winning season ===
The 2003 season saw a temporary end to the losing, when Peña, in his first full season with the club, guided the team to its first winning record (83–79) since 1994 and a third-place finish in the AL Central. He was named the American League Manager of the Year for his efforts and shortstop Ángel Berroa was named AL Rookie of the Year.

=== 2004–2008: Rock bottom ===
From the 2004 season through the 2012 season, the Royals posted nine consecutive losing records, the longest streak in team history. In six of those seasons, the team finished in last place in the American League Central, and in eight of those nine seasons the team lost at least 90 games. The worst seasons came in 2004–2006, when the Royals lost at least 100 games each year and set the franchise's all-time record for losses (56–106 in 2005).

After making key signings in the 2004 free agent market, the Royals got off to a poor start and by late June were back in a rebuilding mode, releasing veteran reliever Curtis Leskanic and trading veteran reliever Jason Grimsley and superstar center fielder Carlos Beltrán for prospects, all within a week of each other.

The team subsequently fell apart completely, losing 104 games and breaking the franchise record set just two years earlier. The Royals did, however, see promising seasons from two rookies, center fielder David DeJesus and starting pitcher Zack Greinke. The team continued a youth movement in 2005, but finished with a 56–106 record (.346), a full 43 games out of first place, marking the third time in four seasons that the team reestablished the mark for worst record in franchise history. The season also saw the Royals lose 19 games in a row, a franchise record. During the season manager Tony Peña quit and was replaced by interim manager Bob Schaefer until the Indians' bench coach Buddy Bell was chosen as the next manager. Looking for a quick turnaround, general manager Allard Baird signed several veteran players prior to the 2006 season, including Doug Mientkiewicz, Mark Grudzielanek, Joe Mays and Scott Elarton. Nevertheless, the Royals struggled through another 100-loss season in 2006, becoming just the eleventh team in major league history to lose 100 games in three straight seasons. During the season Baird was fired as GM and replaced by Dayton Moore.

Kansas City entered the 2007 season looking to rebound from four out of five seasons ending with at least 100 losses. The Royals outbid the Cubs and Blue Jays for free agent righty Gil Meche, signing him to a five-year, $55 million contract, the largest contract in Royals history. Reliever Octavio Dotel also inked a one-year, $5 million contract. The team also added several new prospects, including Alex Gordon and Billy Butler. Among Dayton Moore's first acts as General Manager was instating a new motto for the team: "True. Blue. Tradition." In June 2007, the Royals had their first winning month since July 2003 and followed it up with a winning July. The Royals finished the season 69–93, but 2007 marked the club's first season with fewer than 100 losses since 2003. Manager Buddy Bell resigned following the 2007 season.

The Royals hired Trey Hillman, formerly the manager of the Nippon Ham Fighters and a minor league manager with the New York Yankees, to be the 15th manager in franchise history. The 2008 season began with the release of fan-favorite Mike Sweeney and the trade of Ángel Berroa to the Dodgers. Through 13 games in 2008, the Royals were 8–5 and in first place in the AL Central, a vast improvement over their start from the previous season. However, by the All-Star break, the Royals were again in losing territory, with their record buoyed only by a 13–5 record in interleague play, the best in the American League. The team finished the season in fourth place in the division with a 75–87 record.

=== 2009–2012: Kauffman renovations and further rebuilding ===
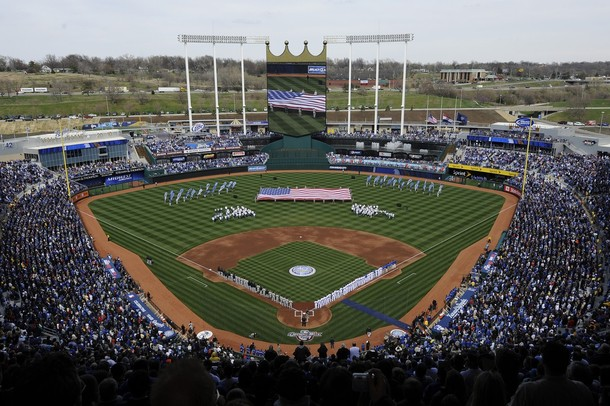
Kauffman Stadium underwent renovations in 2009, including the addition of a high-definition scoreboard.

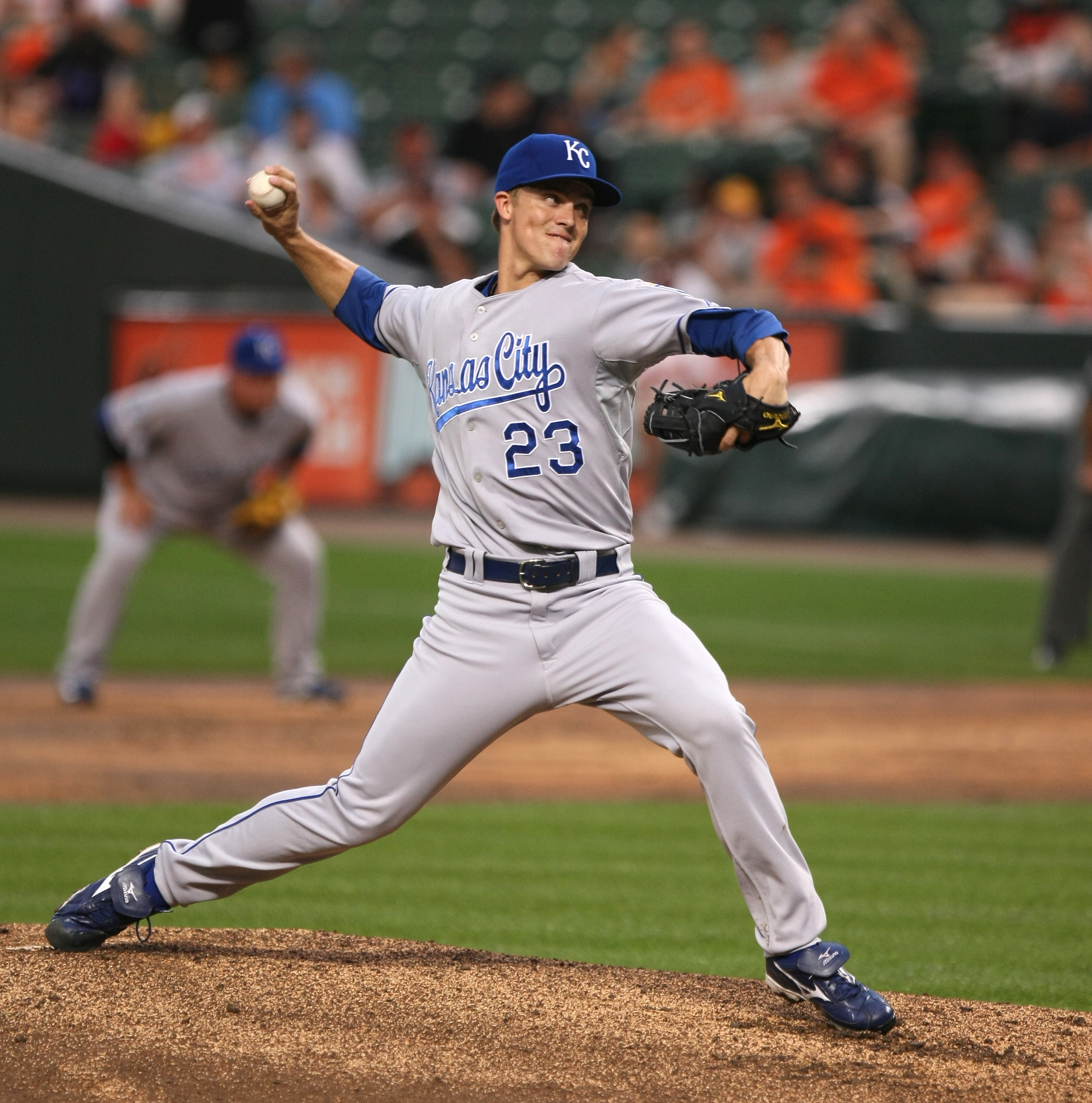
Zack Greinke did not allow an earned run in the first 24 innings of the 2009 season as a starter.

Prior to the 2009 season, the Royals renovated Kauffman Stadium, and after the season began, the Royals ended April at the top of the AL Central, both of which raised excitement levels among fans. However, the team faded as the season progressed and finished the year with a final record of 65–97, in a tie for fourth place in the AL Central. The season was highlighted by starter Zack Greinke, who did not allow an earned run in the first 24 innings of the season, went on to finish the year with a Major League-leading 2.16 earned run average, and won the American League Cy Young Award. Greinke joined Bret Saberhagen (in 1985 and 1989) and David Cone (in 1994) as only the third player in Royals history to receive the award.

The Royals began the 2010 season with a rocky start, and after the team's record fell to 12–23, manager Trey Hillman was fired. Former Milwaukee Brewers skipper Ned Yost took over as the 16th manager in franchise history, At the end of the 2010 season, the Royals finished with a 67–95 record, in last place in the division for the sixth time in seven years. The Royals also set a dubious franchise record during the season, allowing 42 runs in a three-day span from July 25 to 27. The Royals began 2011 with a hot start, compiling 10–4 record after 14 games, but success faded as the season progressed. The Royals last had a .500 record at 22–22, and by the All-Star break, the Royals had a record of 37–54, the worst in the American League. Almost all of the Royals' bullpen was made up of 2011 minor league call ups, in addition to the infielders Eric Hosmer, Mike Moustakas, Johnny Giavotella, and catchers Salvador Pérez and Manny Piña. Hosmer won the AL Rookie of the Month award in July and September and finished the season with 19 home runs. Moustakas collected a fifteen-game hitting streak, which tied the longest such streak by a Royals rookie. The Royals finished the 2011 season with a 71–91 record, in fourth place in the AL Central. The 2012 team saw more of the same, as they improved by one game to 72–90, but finished one spot better in the division.

The 2012 Major League Baseball All-Star Game was hosted by the Royals at Kauffman Stadium on July 10, 2012 (in addition to the 2012 Home Run Derby, All-Star Futures Game and Taco Bell All-Star Legends and Celebrity Softball Game during the All-Star break), which the National League won 8–0. The 2012 season marked the third time the "Midsummer Classic" was held in Kansas City.

=== 2013: Return to respectability ===
On December 10, 2012, in an attempt to strengthen the pitching staff (which was among the worst in baseball in 2012), the Royals traded for Rays pitchers James Shields and Wade Davis, giving Tampa top prospects Wil Myers, Jake Odorizzi, Mike Montgomery, and Patrick Leonard in return. This trade helped catalyze a return to winning records.

For most of the 2013 season, the Royals hovered near .500. The team also did not commit an error in its first seven games (for 64 2/3 innings) for the first time in team history. On September 22, the Royals won their 82nd game of the season to clinch the franchise's first winning season since 2003. The Royals finished the season 86–76 and in third place in the AL Central, securing the team's best winning percentage since 1994.

=== 2014: Return to the World Series ===
The 2014 season featured a return to the postseason for the first time in 29 years, and what would unfold as a historic playoff run from the Wild Card all the way to the 2014 World Series.

Anchored by the "HDH" trio of Kelvin Herrera, Wade Davis, and Greg Holland, the bullpen became one of the most dominant in MLB history.

Entering the 2014 season, the Royals had the longest playoff drought of any team in the four main American professional sports leagues (NFL, MLB, NHL, and NBA). On July 21, 2014, the Royals had a losing record (48–50) and were eight games behind the Detroit Tigers in the AL Central standings. But spurred by a 22–5 record from July 22 to August 19 coinciding with a mediocre 12–15 stretch by the Tigers, the team surged into first place in the AL Central. The Royals reached the top of the division standings on August 11, after winning their eighth game in a row. This marked the latest date the Royals had led their division since August 29, 2003. The team retained its division lead for a month, before falling out of first-place permanently on September 12. They finished the 2014 regular season with a record 89–73, still the most wins for the Royals since 1989. Though the team finished one game behind Detroit in the AL Central, the Royals secured their first-ever wild card berth.

After qualifying for the postseason, the Royals embarked on a record-setting eight-game winning streak. They hosted the Oakland Athletics in the 2014 American League Wild Card Game and won 9–8 on a Salvador Pérez walk-off single in the 12th inning, having earlier rallied back from a 7–3 deficit in the eighth. The Royals then swept the Los Angeles Angels of Anaheim in the 2014 American League Division Series. In Game 1 of the ALDS, the score was 2–2 going into the 11th inning, when Mike Moustakas hit a game-winning solo home run. The next day, Kansas City beat the Angels 4–1 in another extra-innings affair, in the process setting an MLB postseason record of three straight extra-inning wins. The Royals then completed the sweep at home, winning 8–3 in game three and advancing to the 2014 American League Championship Series against the Baltimore Orioles.

In the opening game of the ALCS on October 11, 2014, the Royals defeated the Orioles 8–6, with two home runs in the 10th inning. Thus, in eight extra innings over five postseason games in 2014, they succeeded in hitting four homers in extra innings, more than any team in the history of Major League Baseball. In the second ALCS game, the Royals again beat the Orioles 6–4, behind Lorenzo Cain's four hits, including an RBI single. After game three, the ALCS was delayed one day due to rainy weather, when the Royals hosted the Orioles at Kauffman Stadium on October 14, 2014. Pitcher Jeremy Guthrie allowed only one run as KC beat the Orioles 2–1, taking a 3–0 lead in the series. In game four, the Royals completed the sweep of the Orioles with another 2–1 win to advance to the World Series for the first time since 1985. The win marked the team's eighth consecutive postseason win in one year, breaking a major league record previously held by the Colorado Rockies in 2007 and Cincinnati Reds in 1976. It also marked the Royals' 11th win in a row overall in postseason play, dating back to the franchise's final three wins of the 1985 Series, the third-longest multi-year postseason streak in baseball history.

The Royals faced the San Francisco Giants in the 2014 World Series. They had home-field advantage, due to the American League's win in the 2014 All-Star Game.

After setting an AL record by winning eight straight games to reach the World Series, the Royals opened the series by losing 7–1 in the first game against starter Madison Bumgarner. The Royals bounced back with a 7–2 win in game two to tie the series at 1–1. The Royals won game three in San Francisco 3–2 to take the series lead for the first time. In game four, the Royals lost 11–4, which tied the series with the Giants. In game five, they lost 5–0 to the Giants against starter Madison Bumgarner. In game six, the Royals beat the Giants 10–0. In game seven, the Royals started Jeremy Guthrie against Giants pitcher Tim Hudson. Guthrie lasted 3 1/3 innings before he was replaced by Kelvin Herrera, who himself lasted 2 2/3 innings. He was then replaced by Wade Davis, who pitched in two innings. Closer Greg Holland ended the game. On the Giants side, Hudson lasted only 1 2/3 innings before he was replaced by Jeremy Affeldt, who was later replaced by Madison Bumgarner. The Royals lost game seven, 3–2, with the tying run (Alex Gordon) on third base in the bottom of the ninth with two outs, when Salvador Pérez fouled out to Pablo Sandoval to end the game and the series.

=== 2015: World Series Champions ===
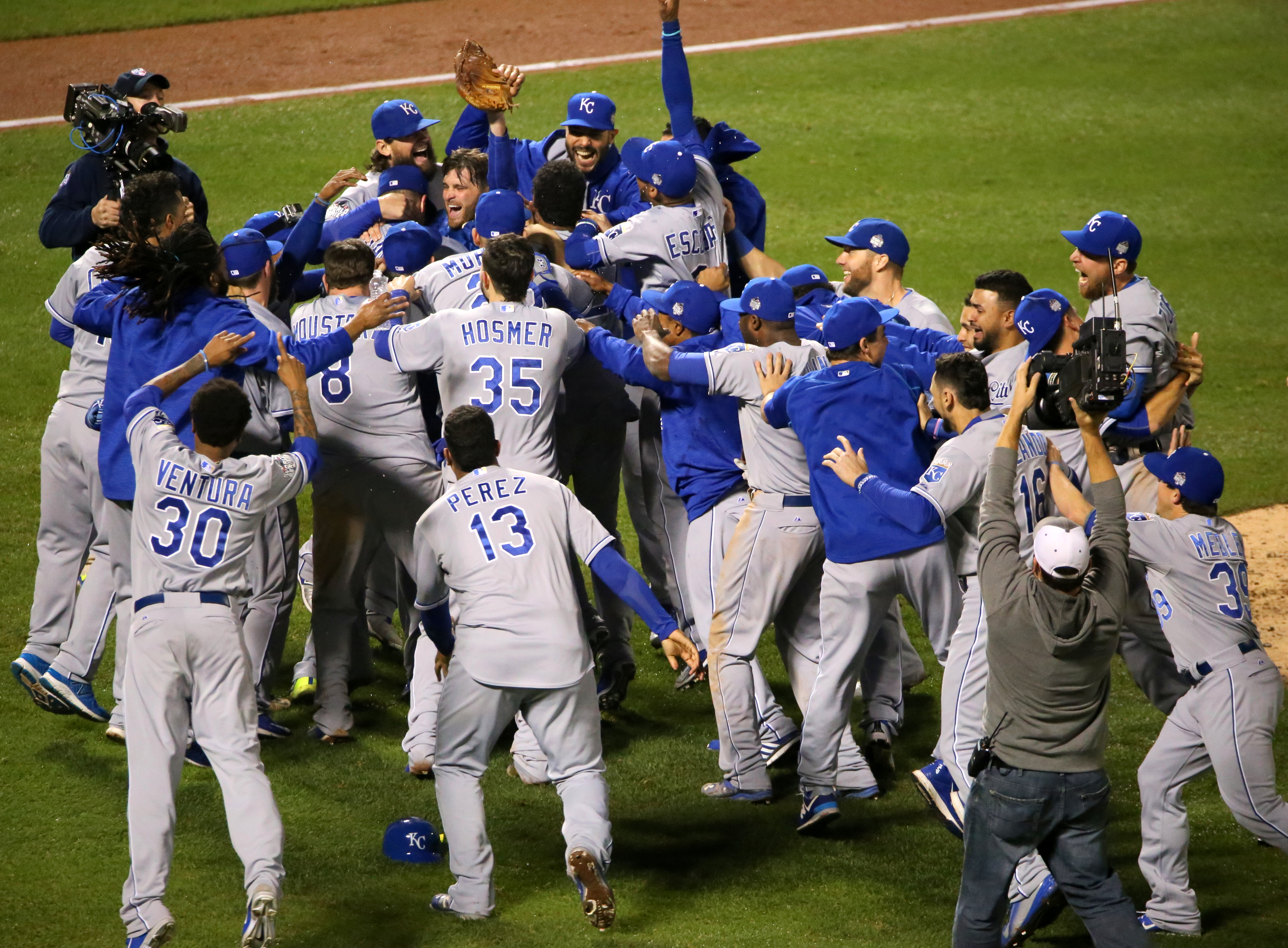
Royals celebrating winning the 2015 World Series

After earning a wild card entry to the playoffs in 2014, in 2015, the Royals won the franchise's first division title since 1985 and first Central division title ever. The Royals went on to win the 2015 World Series – the first championship for the Royals since 1985 – beating the New York Mets four games to one.

The Royals entered the 2015 All-Star break with the best record in the American League at 52–34. The team continued its momentum into the second half of the season, and on July 26, Royals management traded three prospects Brandon Finnegan, John Lamb, and Cody Reed for 2014 All-Star pitcher Johnny Cueto to help bolster its starting pitching rotation, as well as trading two pitchers to the Oakland Athletics for super-utility player Ben Zobrist. The team ended the regular season with a record of 95–67, the best in the entire American League, and the organization's best record since 1980.

The Royals faced the Houston Astros in the ALDS. Down 2–1 in the series and trailing 6–2 in the 8th inning of Game 4, the Royals rallied for 5 runs en route to a 9–6 win before Cueto's gem in Game 5 powered the Royals to a second consecutive ALCS. The Royals defeated the Toronto Blue Jays in Game 6, to win the 2015 ALCS and earn a trip to face the New York Mets in the 2015 World Series.

The Royals beat the New York Mets 4 games to 1 to become the 2015 World Series champions. It was the Royals' first World Series title since 1985. The series win was sealed after the Royals beat the Mets 7–2 in the 12th inning of Game 5. The Royals rallied in the 9th inning down 2–0 to tie the score 2–2, forcing the game into extra innings. The five-run 12th inning was initiated by a Salvador Pérez single, with Jarrod Dyson pinch-running for him. This was followed by a single from Christian Colon and doubles from both Alcides Escobar and Lorenzo Cain, scoring runs from Jarrod Dyson, Colon, Paulo Orlando (who reached base on an error by Daniel Murphy), Escobar and Ben Zobrist (who was intentionally walked). Wade Davis, who hadn't allowed a run yet that postseason, closed out the game with a flawless 12th, allowing one hit and striking out Wilmer Flores to end the game and win the World Series for the Royals. Upon conclusion of the final game, catcher Salvador Perez was named World Series MVP.

=== 2016–2017: End of an era ===
The Royals followed up their World Series victory with an underachieving, injury-riddled campaign in 2016. The Royals had an inconsistent season in which they ultimately finished 81–81, third place in the division and out of playoff contention. This season is notable for the debut of future star Whit Merrifield. The 2017 season marked the end of the World Series core: pitcher Yordano Ventura was killed in a car accident on January 22, and the Royals wore patches that said 'ACE 30' on their jerseys for the 2017 season to honor him; Wade Davis was traded in the offseason. In 2017, the Royals finished similarly to 2016 at 80–82, third place in the division, and missed the playoffs for a second consecutive year. Stars Lorenzo Cain and Eric Hosmer became free agents after the season and signed contracts with the Milwaukee Brewers and San Diego Padres, respectively. However, through both of these years the Royals were one of the most successful teams in the league at challenging umpire calls via instant replay thanks to the work of replay coordinator Bill Duplissea.

=== 2018–present: John Sherman era ===
Although Eric Hosmer and Lorenzo Cain left in free agency, the Royals were able to re-sign Mike Moustakas and Alcides Escobar. In 2018, the team started a new rebuild, trading Moustakas mid-season for prospects, and giving playing time to young players like Adalberto Mondesi, Ryan O'Hearn, and Brad Keller. Despite this, the team finished with only 58 wins, the team's lowest win total since 2005. The 2018 season also marked the emergence of Whit Merrifield as a star, as he led MLB in hits (192) and stolen bases (45).

On June 3, 2019, the Royals selected Bobby Witt Jr. with the second pick in the MLB draft. Widely considered one of the top prospects in baseball, Witt is regarded as one of the biggest prospects to be drafted by Kansas City since Eric Hosmer and Mike Moustakas.

On August 30, 2019, it was announced that John Sherman, a minority owner of the Cleveland Indians, had agreed to purchase the team from David Glass for a reported amount of $1 billion. In September, manager Ned Yost announced that he would retire at the end of the season after ten seasons and a franchise-record 746 wins. The Royals finished the 2019 season one game better than 2018, at 59–103. Whit Merrifield once again led the league in hits, while Jorge Soler led the American League with 48 home runs and three Royals players paced the league in triples (Mondesi, Merrifield and Hunter Dozier, with 10 apiece). On October 31, 2019, the Royals announced the hiring of former St. Louis Cardinals manager Mike Matheny to replace Ned Yost. In 2020, the season was shortened to 60 games because of the COVID-19 pandemic; the Royals finished with a 26–34 record (a .433 winning percentage), good for fourth place in the AL Central. Overall in 2021, the Royals finished with a 74–88 record (a .457 winning percentage), landing in fourth place in the AL Central but seeing improvement over both 2019 and 2020, as catcher Salvador Pérez led MLB in both home runs and runs batted in and Bobby Witt Jr. continued to emerge as one of the top prospects in Minor League Baseball.

Beginning with the 2022 season, Dayton Moore was promoted to the team's President of Baseball Operations and J. J. Picollo began his tenure as general manager. Moore was fired by the end of the season. The Royals spent 2022 blending their roster with several rookies (including Bobby Witt Jr., MJ Melendez, and Vinnie Pasquantino among others), often fielding lineups with six or more rookies on a given night. The team finished in fourth place of the AL Central with a 65–97 record, and Mike Matheny was fired after their season finale in Cleveland.

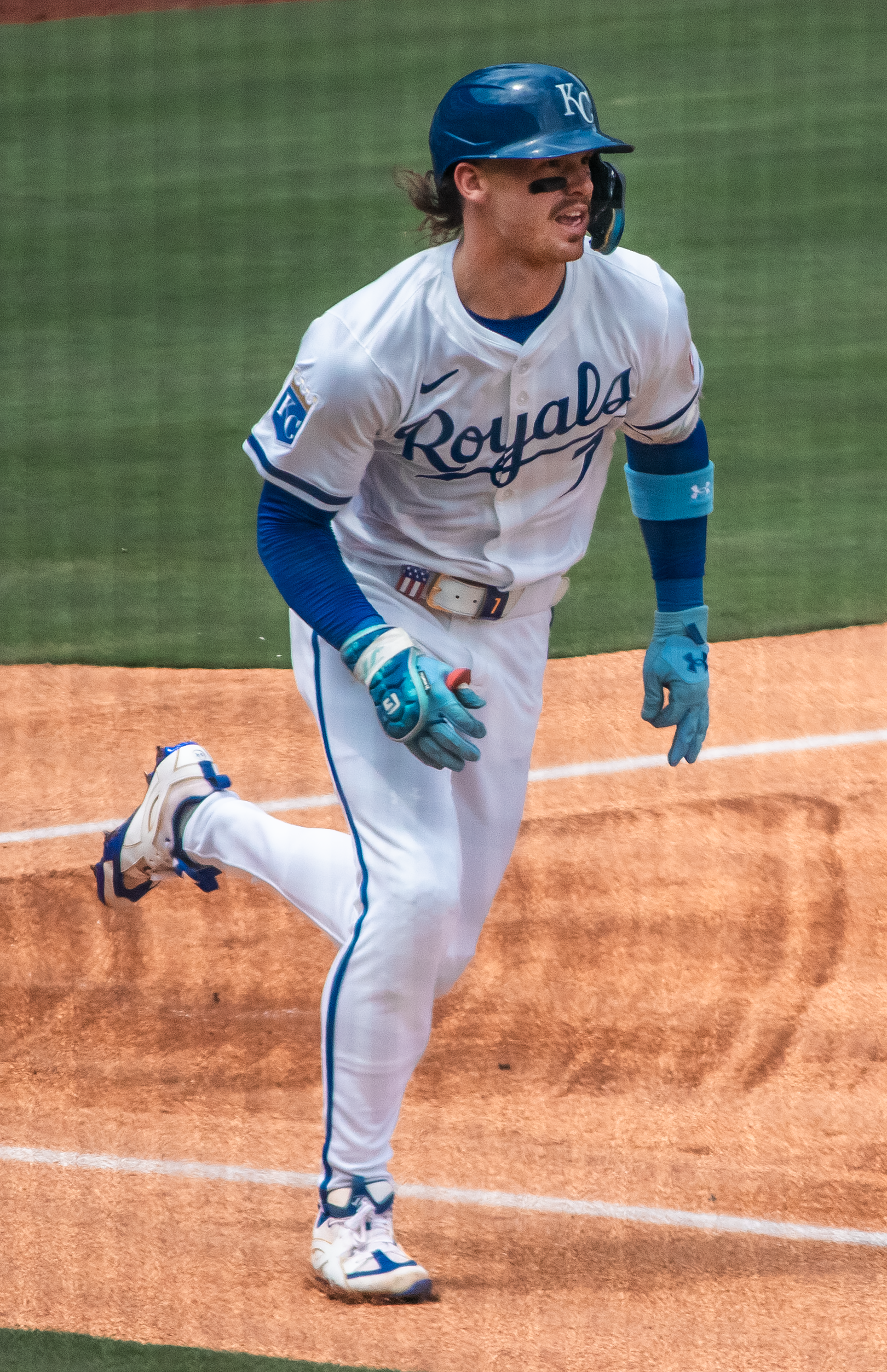
Bobby Witt Jr.

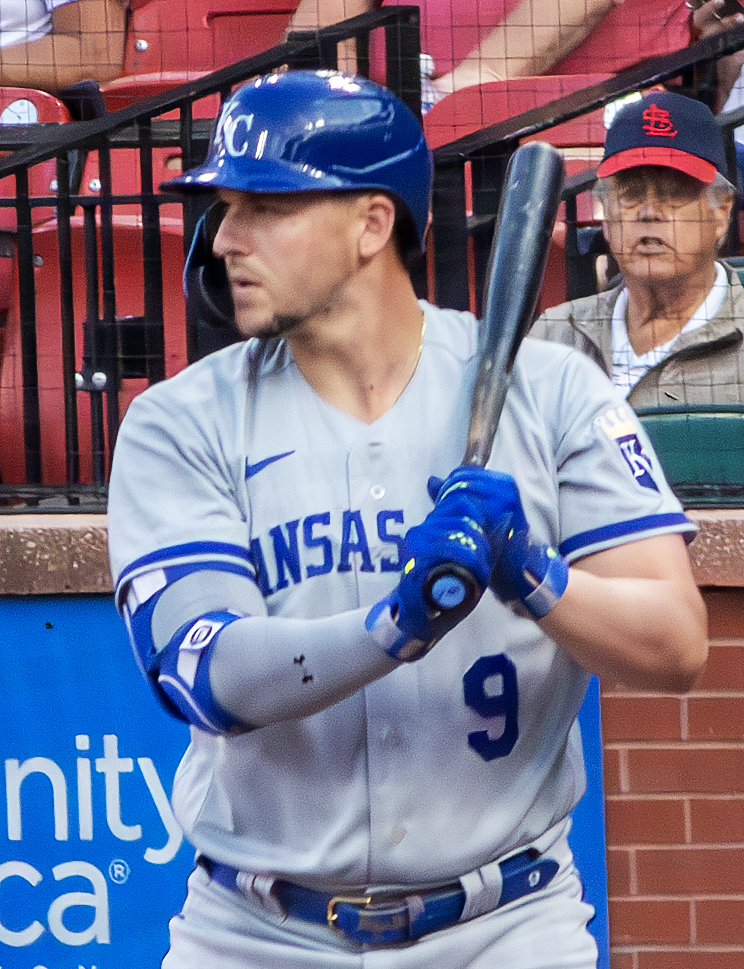
Vinnie Pasquantino

Matt Quatraro was hired as manager for the 2023 season, and the team finished with a record of 56–106. Leading into the 2024 season, the Royals were aggressive in the offseason signing pitchers such as Michael Wacha and Seth Lugo. The 2024 Royals became the second team ever to go from over 100 losses from the season prior to a playoff berth in the next. They clinched their first playoff berth since 2015 on September 27, 2024. They swept the Baltimore Orioles in the Wild Card round and lost to the New York Yankees in the American League Division series.

In February 2025, former manager Ned Yost rejoined the team as a senior advisor to general manager J. J. Picollo. The team finished the 2025 season in third place of the AL Central with a record of 82–80.

In the 2026 season, the team led a disappointing campaign marred by injuries and underperformance, finishing 69-93, 5th place in the AL Central. They were led by another stellar season from Bobby Witt Jr., a solid campaign from veteran pitcher Michael Wacha, and breakouts by sophomore outfielder Jac Caglianone and rookie catcher and Kansas City native Carter Jensen. On July 25th, in a game against the Detroit Tigers, longtime Royals catcher and team captain Salvador Perez broke George Brett's franchise home run record, hitting a record 318th home run.

==== Future stadium plans ====
Team owner John Sherman announced in November 2022 that the team plans to leave Kauffman Stadium prior to the end of their lease which expires at the end of the 2030 MLB season. The team announced in June 2023 that the two final sites under consideration for the stadium district were the East Village neighborhood and North Kansas City, but a third site in the Crossroads district emerged as the final site chosen by the team in February 2024. In April 2024, Jackson County voters rejected a ballot initiative to help fund the stadium. The Royals, who had pledged at least $1 billion from ownership for their project, wanted to use their share of the tax revenue to help fund a $2 billion-plus ballpark district. The team plans to open a new stadium by the start of the 2027 or 2028 MLB season, and it would have a seating capacity of about 34,000. The Royals are also considering relocating across the state border to Kansas City, Kansas, as well as considering building a downtown ballpark in Washington Square Park, an area located between Union Station and Crown Center on the Missouri side. In November 2024, it was reported that the Royals were also examining "two or three" potential stadium sites in Johnson County, Kansas.

On April 22, 2026, the Royals and Hallmark Cards announced a partnership to build a new ballpark in Crown Center, at the current location of Hallmark's corporate headquarters, instead of the Crossroads site. Groundbreaking is scheduled to take place in 2027. In October 2026, the Royals and Populous Holdings released updated renderings and confirmed that demolition of existing buildings will begin in late 2026 or early 2027.

== Uniform history ==
=== 1969–1972: Original look ===
The Royals' home uniform remained almost unchanged from its first season. The original design featured blue arm and neck piping, along with "Royals" in blue and in script lettering. The road uniform was inverted from the home uniform, with "Kansas City" written in blue, in script lettering and in an arch arrangement. For the 1971 season the "Kansas City" on the road uniforms were changed to block lettering, while both uniforms added a roundel containing the team logo on the left sleeve. The blue cap with "KC" stitched in front was also introduced and remains in use today.

=== 1973–1982: Pullover and powder blue uniforms ===
The Royals switched to pullover uniforms for the 1973 season. While the home uniform did not deviate much from its original design, the road uniform changed to a powder blue base and white letters. Names were added in the 1978 season.

=== 1983–1991: Return to buttoned style ===
The Royals returned to wearing buttoned uniforms for the 1983 season. The most notable change came on the powder blue uniform, where "Royals" in script replaced "Kansas City". Both uniforms added numbers on the left chest.

=== 1992–2001: Return to grey uniforms and alternate blue uniforms ===
For the 1992 season, the Royals resumed wearing grey uniforms on the road, but the uniforms retained the "Royals" script and letters in blue with white trim. In 1994 a blue alternate uniform was introduced, with "Royals" script and letters in white. The following season, the road uniforms were tweaked to feature "Kansas City" in block letters, while neck piping was removed. A grey cap with blue brim and "KC" in blue was also used for a few games.

=== 2002–2005: Addition of black ===
Before the 2002 season, the Royals added black to the color scheme, and this was also reflected on the team's uniforms. Initially, the home uniforms were only updated to remove blue piping and include black drop shadows, but in 2003, the Royals went with sleeveless uniforms with blue undershirts. The grey uniforms also removed the sleeves and piping, and were paired with black undershirts and a black cap with blue brim. Letters were also given black drop shadows. The Royals also went with a black alternate uniform, featuring blue piping and "Royals" written in blue with white trim. The sleeve patch was updated without the roundel on the home and blue alternate uniforms, while a new "Royals" roundel logo was placed on the grey undershirt and black alternates. The logo removed the "R" from the shield, enlarged the "KC" and added black drop shadows, and the crown was changed to black.

=== 2006–2021: New alternates and return to powder blue ===
In 2006, black was eliminated from the uniforms, and the Royals returned to wearing sleeved uniforms with arm piping. The crown on the "KC" shield logo reverted to gold, but the black drop shadows were not removed until 2019. The road uniforms brought back the "Kansas City" script, albeit written diagonally, with a slight adjustment in size prior to the 2012 season. For a few games in 2006, the black uniforms were used, albeit with the "Kansas City" script, before it was retired. In 2008, the Royals introduced a new powder blue alternate with "Royals" in blue with white trim, and letters in white with blue trim; the color lettering scheme in front was reversed starting in 2012. The uniforms were briefly paired with a powder blue cap with blue brim in 2010. Unlike the previous powder blue uniform, this set is paired with the home white pants. As a result, the royal blue alternates were worn exclusively on select road games.

Powder blue was added as a trim color when the Royals issued a new blue alternate in 2014. The "KC" insignia replaced "Royals" and the number in front, while piping was added. After winning the 2015 World Series, the Royals began wearing an alternate white uniform, featuring "Royals" in metallic gold with blue trim. In 2017, the uniform was updated with the team name in blue with gold trim, and numbers in gold and blue trim. A new blue cap with "KC" in gold was paired with this uniform.

=== 2022–present: Block road letters return; City Connect ===
The Royals unveiled a fresh uniform set for the 2022 season. The primary home uniform remained the same save for the thicker sleeve stripes. The road primary and blue road alternate returned to the block "Kansas City" wordmark the team used from 1971 to 1982, adding chest numbers on both uniforms. The alternate home powder blue uniform removed the royal blue elements, with the numbers taking the same color as the "Royals" script.

Also in 2022, the Royals wore "City Connect" uniforms in homage to Kansas City's "City of Fountains" moniker. The top of the uniform is navy blue with powder blue accents, with a stylized "KC" insignia on the left chest. The "KC" insignia was shaped to resemble a fountain of water shooting up. Pants worn are white with a powder blue stripe on each side. Caps are all-navy while helmets are navy with powder blue brim; both designs incorporate the "KC" in front.

Beginning in 2023, the Royals' powder blue alternate uniform would be worn with powder blue pants for select games, a combination not worn since the 1991 season. In 2025, the Royals' full powder blue uniform would be worn every Saturday home game, and would be paired with their batting practice cap featuring the classic "KCR" crown logo in a white panel along with a powder blue crown and royal blue brim. While the plan had been for the Royals to wear their full powder blue uniforms at home, they began to wear them on select road games as well, something they have not done since 1991.

In 2026, the Royals unveiled a second City Connect uniform, keeping the "City of Fountains" theme but in a white base with fuchsia and blue gradient accents. The crest on the left chest is a stylized "R" with a crown on top, reminiscent of the Royals' original logo, along with racing stripes on the shoulders. The sleeve patch features a fuchsia/blue gradient heart design reflecting Kansas City's placement in the country's heartland. Caps feature a fuchsia/blue base with the crown logo as the crest.

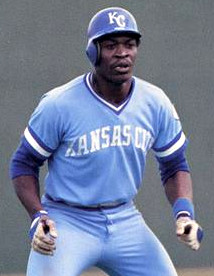
Road pullover uniform (1973–1982), worn by U. L. Washington

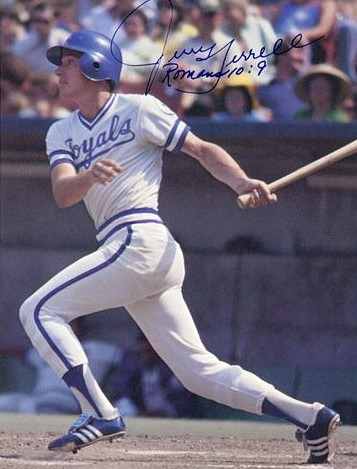
Home pullover uniform (1973–1982), worn by Jerry Terrell

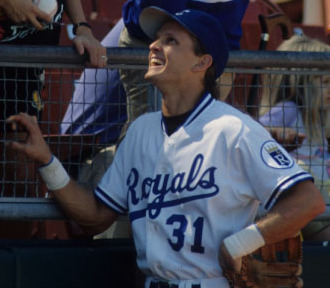
Home uniform (1983–1994), worn by David Howard

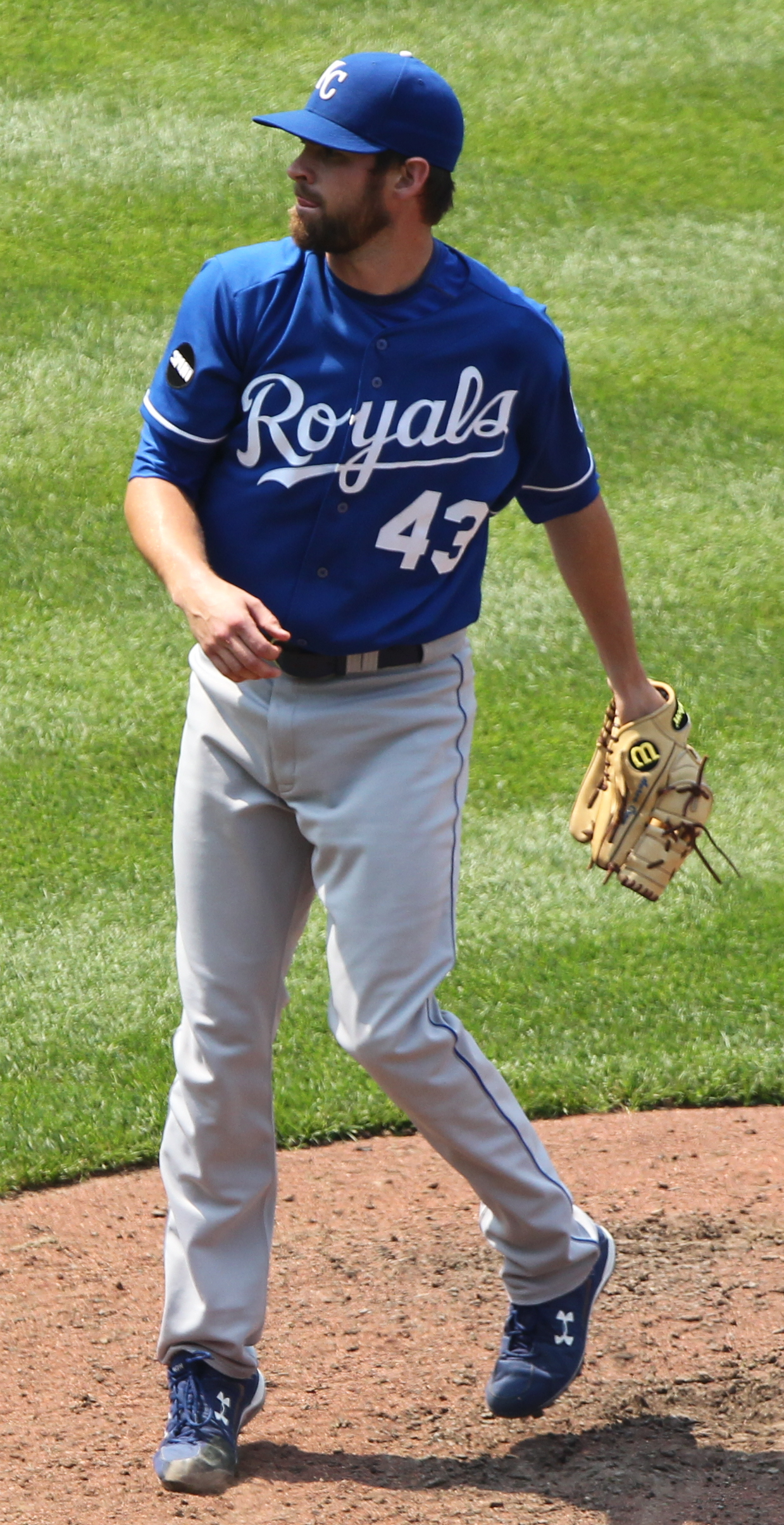
Alternate blue uniform (2006–2013), worn by Aaron Crow. This uniform was worn exclusively on the road starting in 2008.

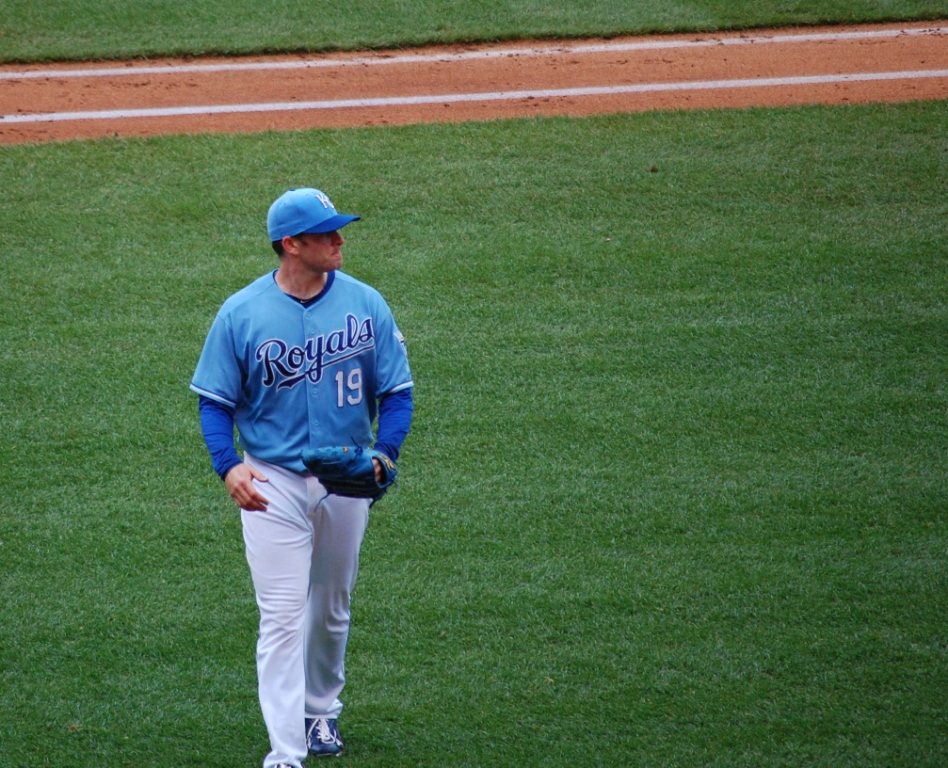
Alternate powder blue uniform with powder blue cap (2010), worn by Brian Bannister

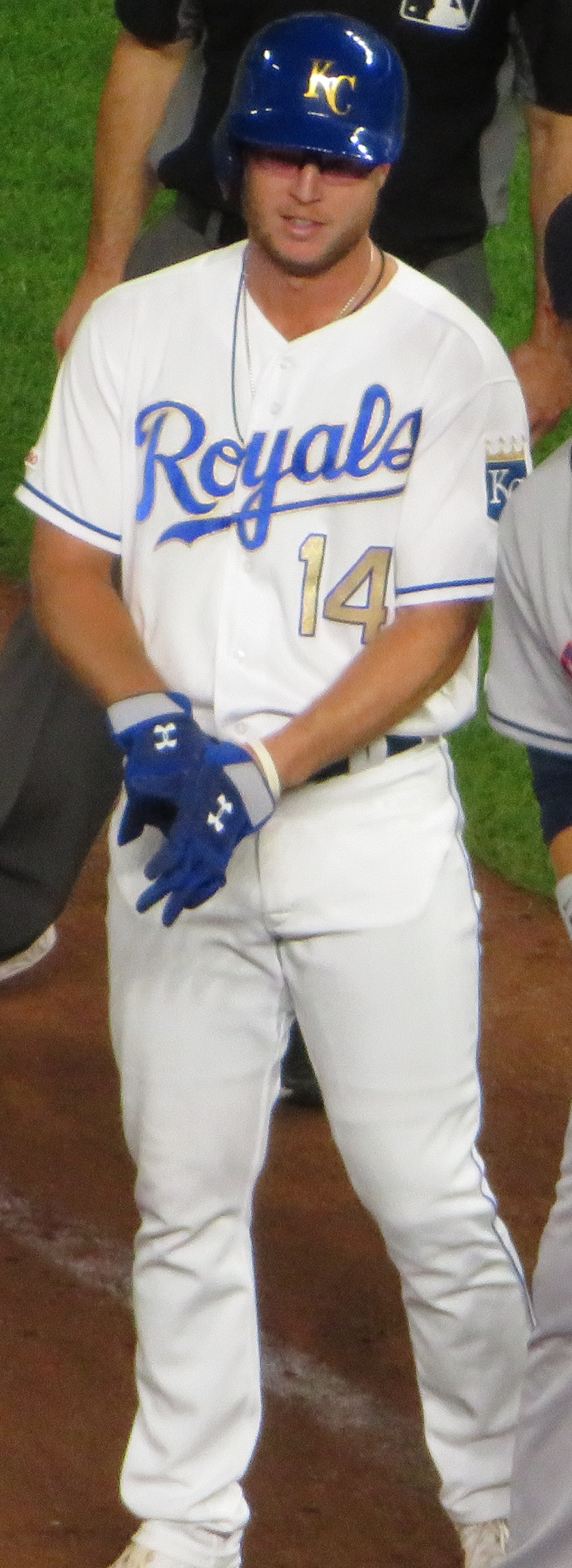
Home alternate uniform (2017–2021), worn by Brett Phillips

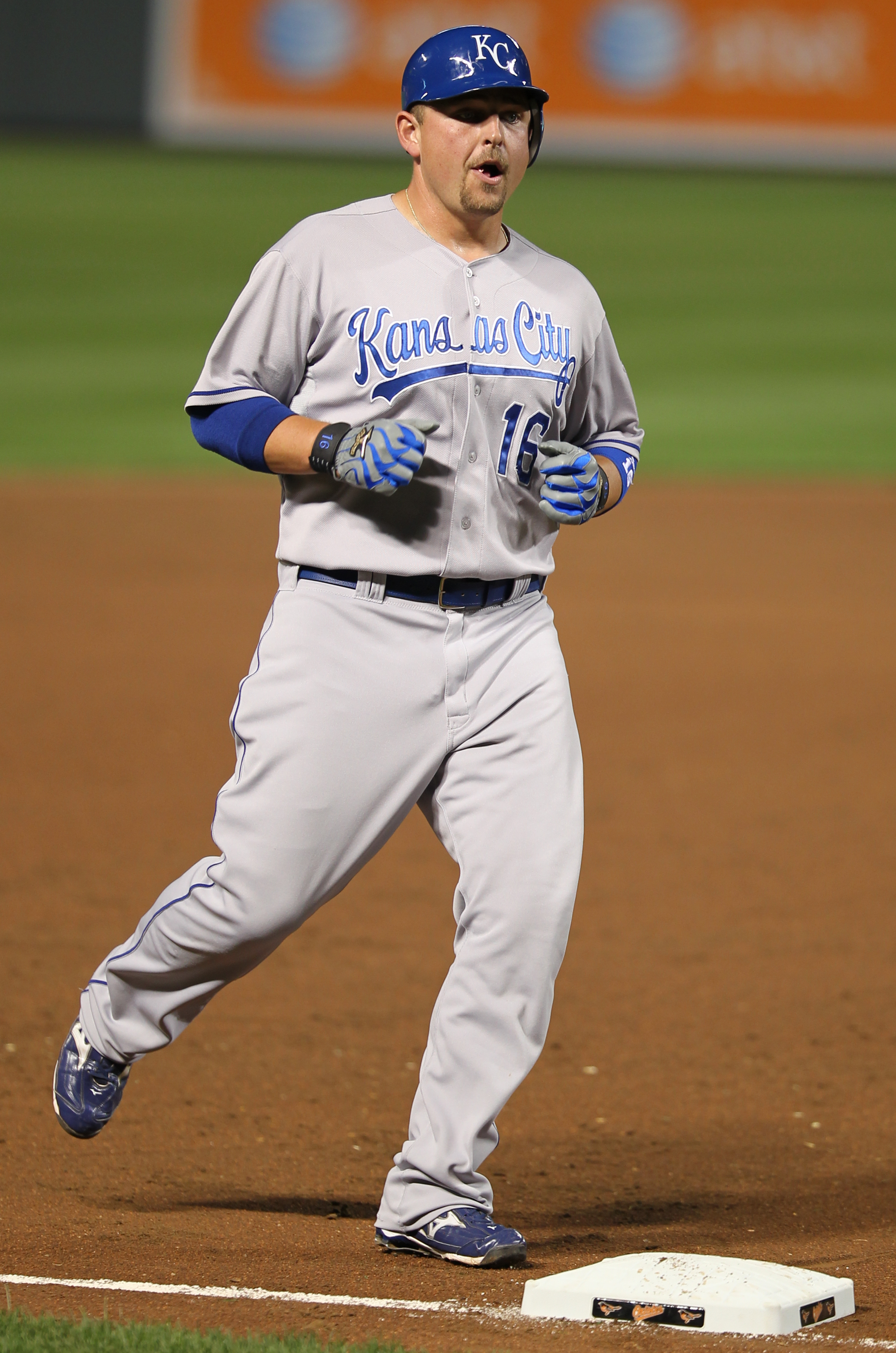
Road uniform (2006–2011), worn by Billy Butler

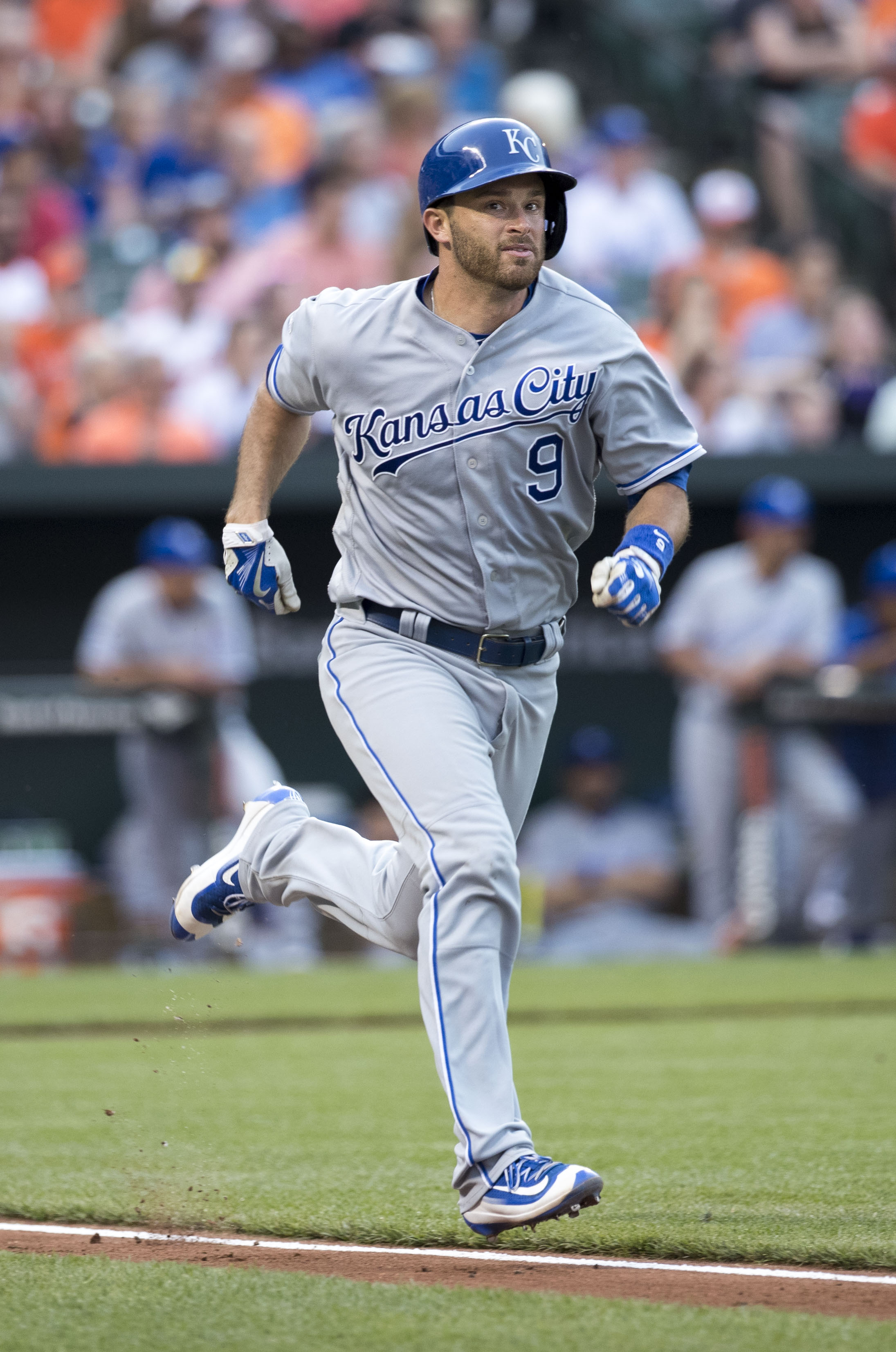
Road uniform (2012–2021), worn by Drew Butera

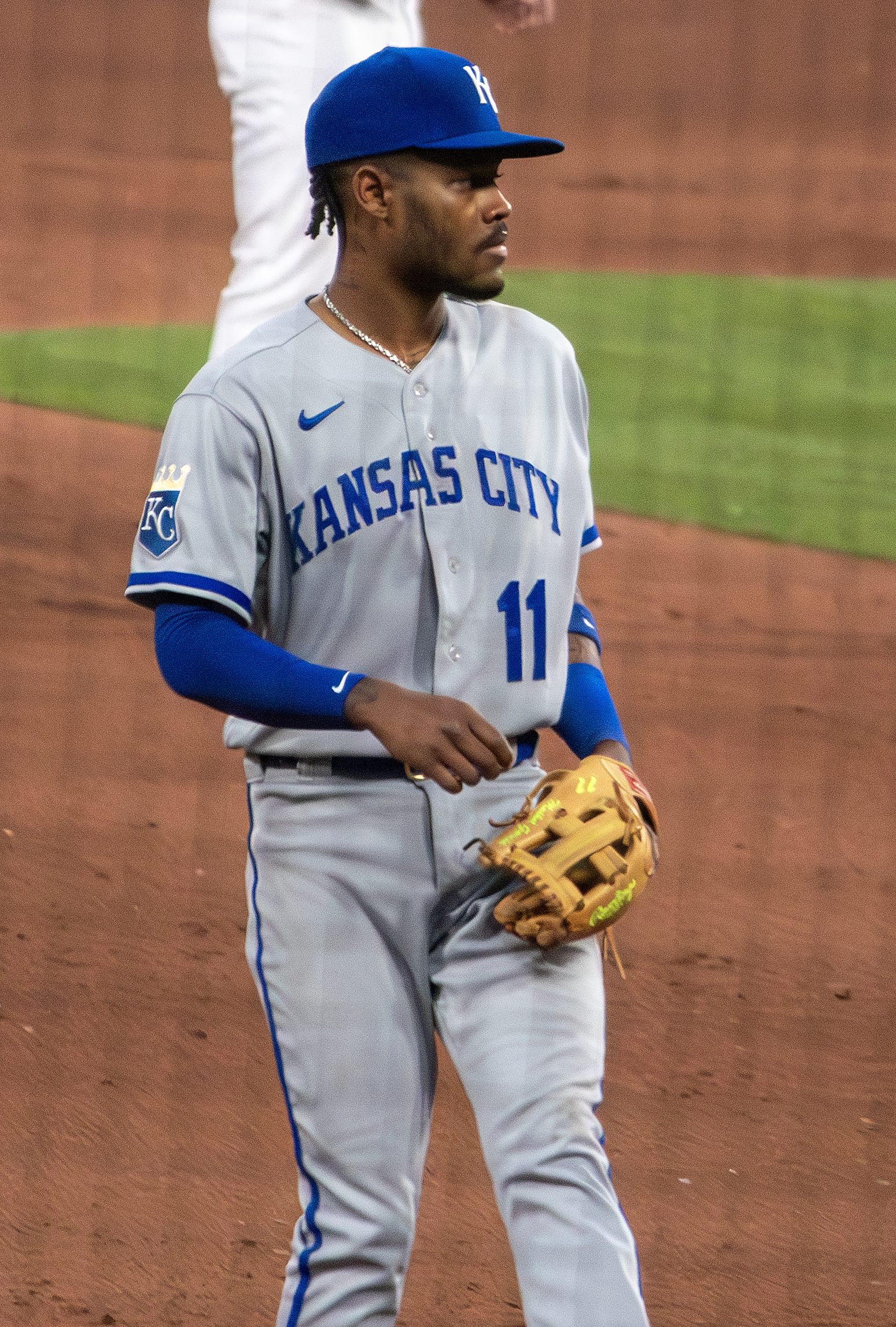
Road uniform (2022–present), worn by Maikel García

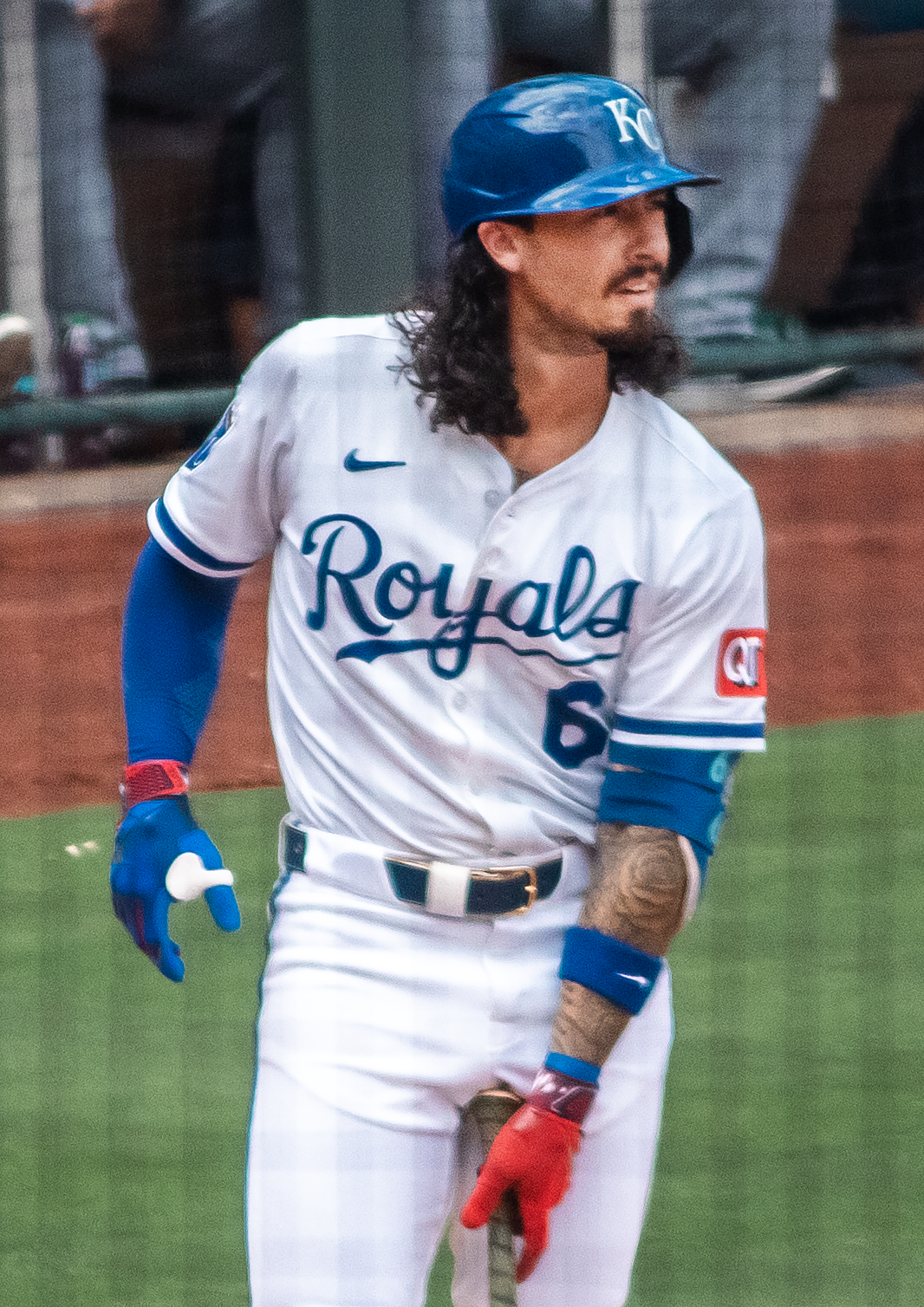
Home uniform (2006–present), worn by Jonathan India

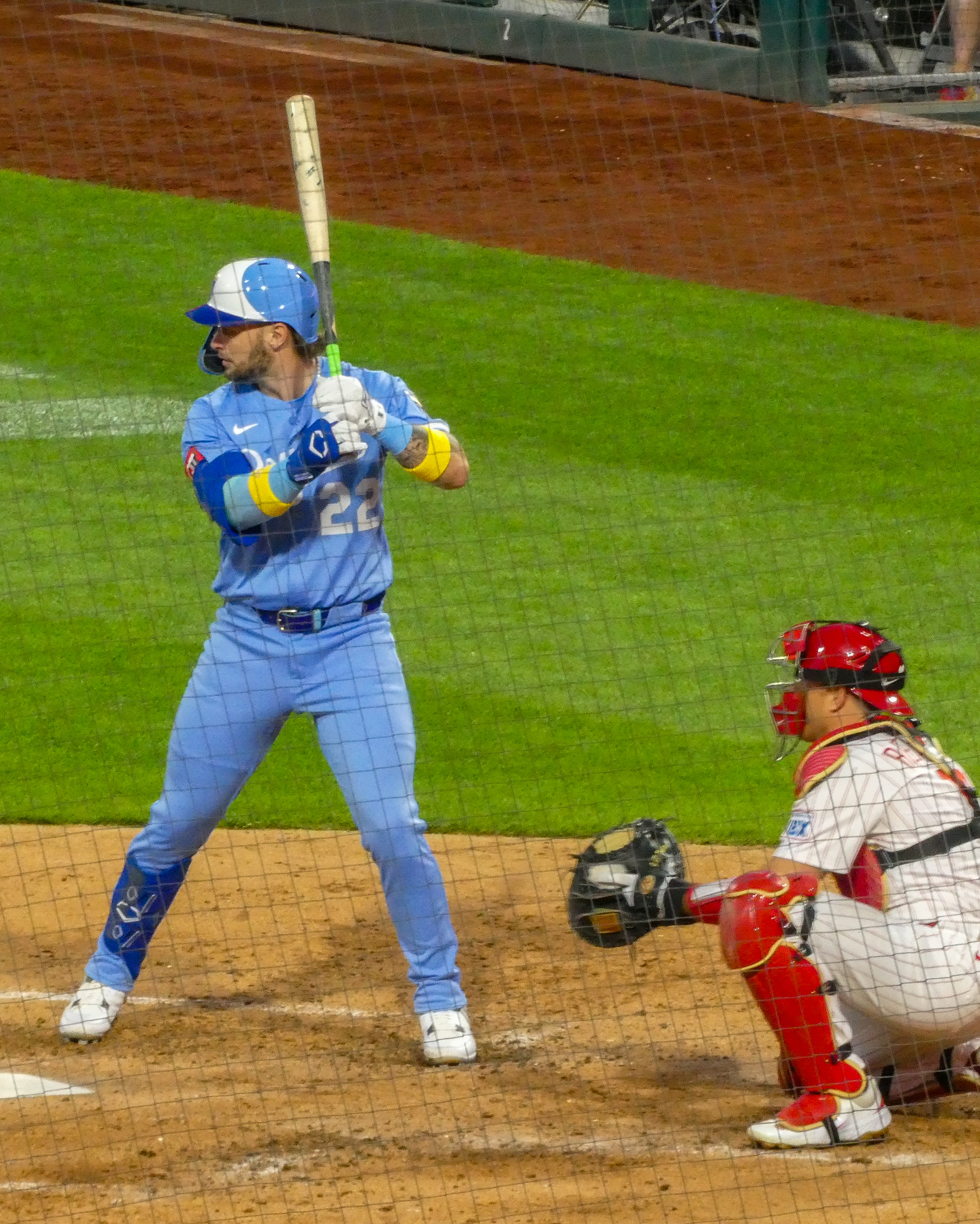
Alternate powder blue uniform (2022–present), worn by Carter Jensen. The powder blue pants were added in 2023 and became a full-time option in 2025 along with a white-paneled powder blue cap with royal blue brim.

== Rivalries ==
=== St. Louis Cardinals ===
The Royals' most prominent rivalry is with the intrastate St. Louis Cardinals. For geographic reasons, the teams long played exhibition games, but a true rivalry began with the Royals' victory over the Cardinals in the 1985 World Series, known as the "I-70 Series." Notably, the manager for the Cardinals in the series was Whitey Herzog, who had been the Royals' manager from 1975 to 1979, and led Kansas City to the franchise's first three playoff appearances – in 1976, 1977, and 1978 – before getting fired just shortly after the Royals were eliminated from playoff contention in 1979. Interleague play in 1997 allowed the I-70 Series to be revived in non-exhibition games. The first few seasons of the series were rather even, with the Cardinals holding a slight advantage with a 14–13 record through the 2003 season. Through the 2023 season, the Cardinals hold the series advantage 75–49.

=== New York Yankees ===
From 1976 to 1980, the Royals faced the New York Yankees four times in five years in the American League Championship Series. The Yankees won in 1976, 1977 and 1978, while the Royals won in 1980. The teams did not face each other in the postseason again until the 2024 American League Division Series, with the Yankees winning in four games. In a 2013 article about the 1983 Pine Tar Incident involving the two teams, Lou Pinella said: "As a team, we didn't really like Kansas City. We had played them in the '76, '77 and '78 postseason and beaten them every time. There was no love lost between the teams. We didn't like each other. They were our big rivals..." George Brett agreed: "I hated everyone on the Yankees, I really did. I hated 'em all, back in that era." Kansas City also held historic grudges against the Yankees in general, as during the Athletics' residency under Arnold Johnson's ownership, it was effectively a de facto "farm team" for the Bronx Bombers due to lopsided trades in favor of New York.

== Baseball Hall of Famers ==
Kansas City Royals Hall of Famers
Affiliation according to the National Baseball Hall of Fame and Museum
Kansas City Royals

Carlos Beltrán
**George Brett** *

Orlando Cepeda
Joe Gordon

Whitey Herzog
Harmon Killebrew

Bob Lemon
Gaylord Perry

John Schuerholz

- Players and managers listed in **bold** are depicted on their Hall of Fame plaques wearing a Royals cap insignia.
- * Kansas City Royals listed as primary team according to the Hall of Fame

=== Ford C. Frick Award recipients ===
Kansas City Royals Ford C. Frick Award recipients
Affiliation according to the National Baseball Hall of Fame and Museum

**Denny Matthews**

- **Names in bold** received the award based primarily on their work as broadcasters for the Royals.

== Other players of note ==
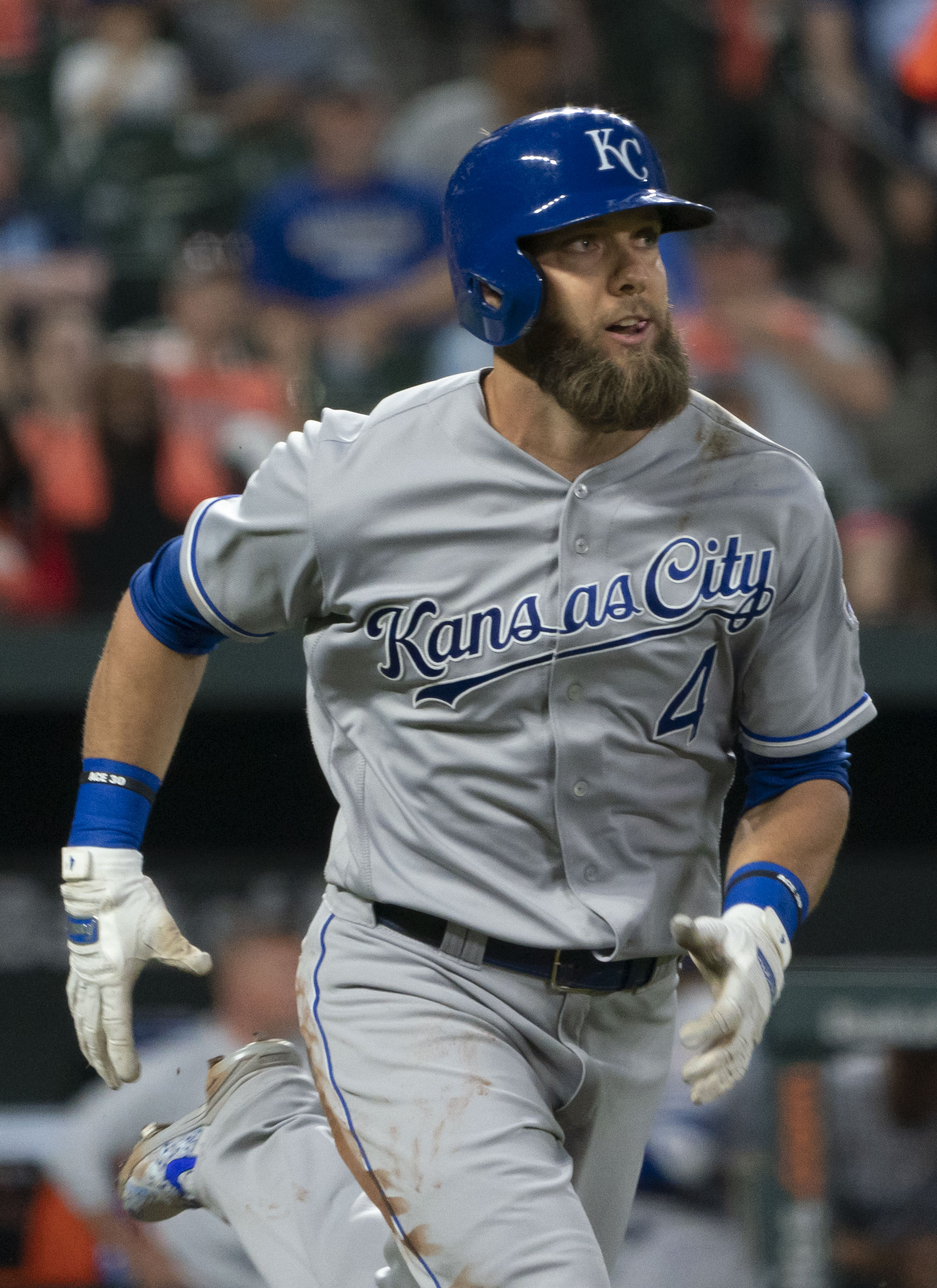
Alex Gordon

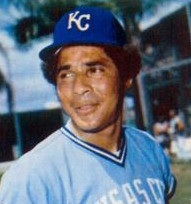
Amos Otis

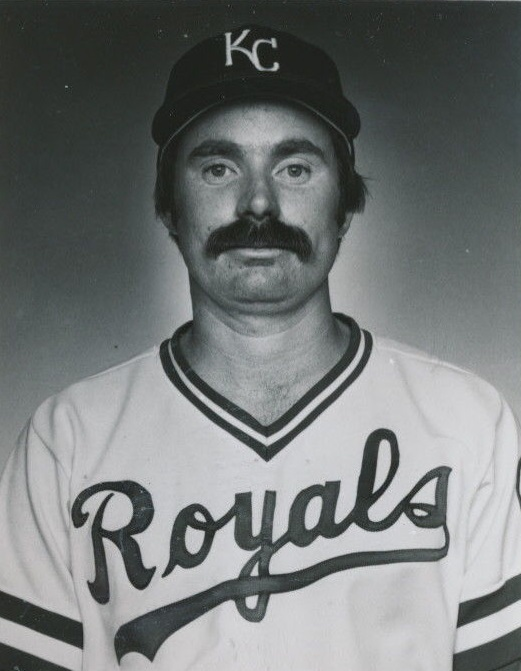
Dan Quisenberry

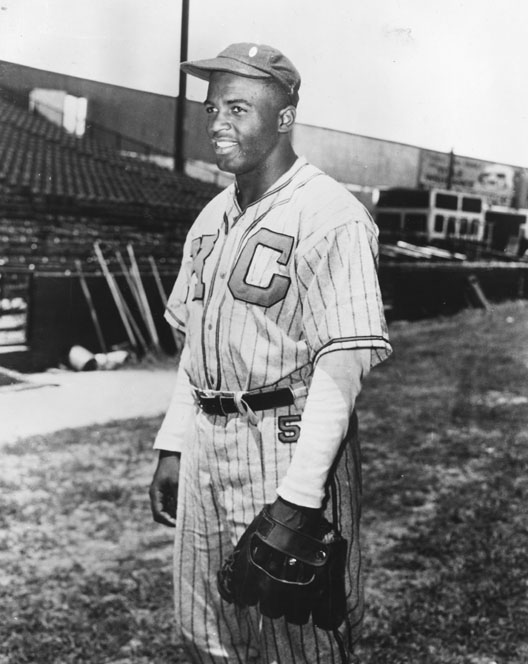
Jackie Robinson (#42 retired throughout MLB) played for the Negro League's Kansas City Monarchs.

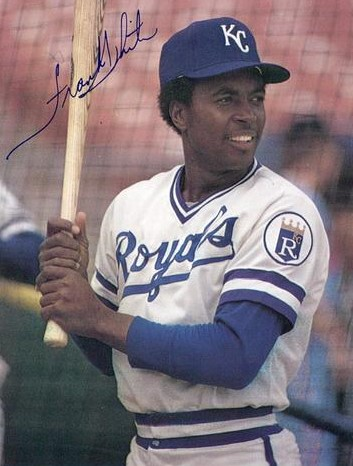
Frank White

=== Team captains ===
- George Brett 1989–1993
- Frank White 1989–1990
- Mike Sweeney 2003–2007
- Salvador Pérez 2023–present

=== Missouri Sports Hall of Fame ===
**Kansas City Royals in the Missouri Sports Hall of Fame**
No.	Player	Position	Tenure	Notes
–	Ewing Kauffman	Founder/Owner	1969–1993	Born near Garden City, grew up in Kansas City
–	Art Stewart	Scout	1969–2021	
–	George Toma	Groundskeeper	1969–1999	
—	Dayton Moore	GM	2006–2021	
2, 37	Fred Patek	SS	1971–1979	
3	Ned Yost	Manager	2010–2019	
4, 7	Alex Gordon	LF	2007–2020	
5, 25	George Brett	3B/DH/1B	1973–1993	
6	Terry Pendleton	3B	1998	
6, 19, 32	Willie Wilson	CF/LF	1976–1990	
8, 22	Jim Eisenreich	OF	1987–1992	
7	John Mayberry	1B	1972–1977	
8, 15, 28	Mike MacFarlane	C	1987–1994; 1996–1998	
11	Hal McRae	OF/DH/Coach; Manager	1973–1987; 1991–1994	
12	John Wathan	C Manager	1976–1985; 1987–1991	
15	Darrell Porter	C	1977–1980	Born in Joplin
16	Bo Jackson	OF/DH	1987–1990	
9, 10, 18	Jamie Quirk	C	1975–1976; 1978–1982; 1985–1988	
19, 20	Frank White	2B	1973–1990	Attended Longview Community College in Lee's Summit
21	Jeff Montgomery	RP	1988–1999	
22	Dennis Leonard	SP	1974–1986	
23	Mark Gubicza	SP	1984–1996	
24	Whitey Herzog	Manager	1975–1979	
26	Amos Otis	CF	1970–1983	
29, 40	Vince Coleman	LF	1994–1995	
29	Dan Quisenberry	RP	1979–1988	
29	Mike Sweeney	C/1B/DH	1995–2007	
30	Orlando Cepeda	1B	1974	
25, 34	Paul Splittorff	SP	1970–1984	
36	Gaylord Perry	SP	1983	
37	Jeff Suppan	P	1998–2002	
39	Al Hrabosky	RP	1978–1979	
40	Steve Busby	SP	1972–1980	

=== Retired numbers ===
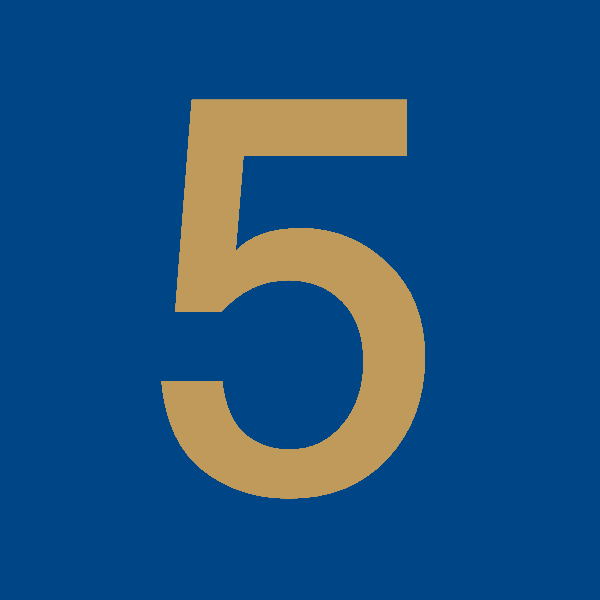
George
Brett
3B
Retired
1994
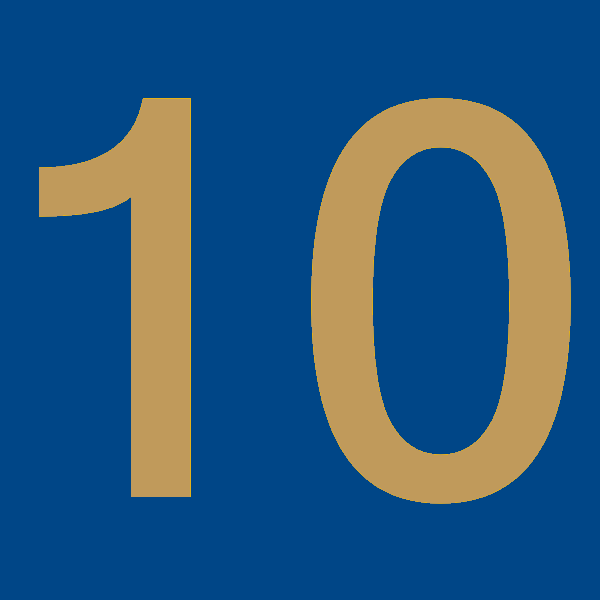
Dick
Howser
Manager
Retired
1987
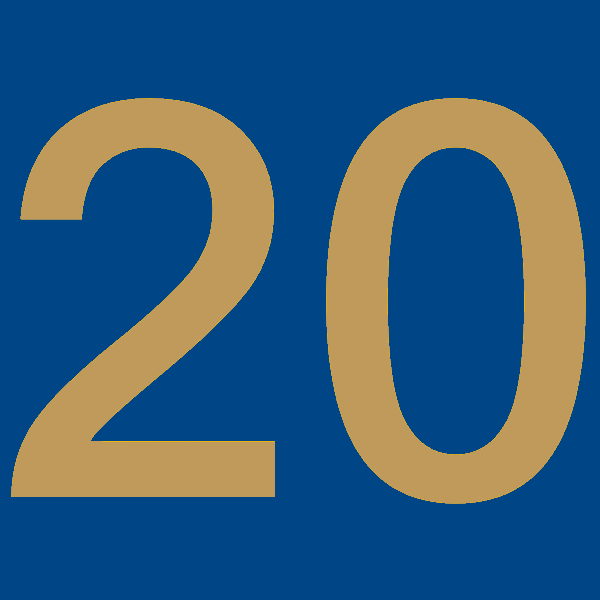
Frank
White
2B
Retired
1995
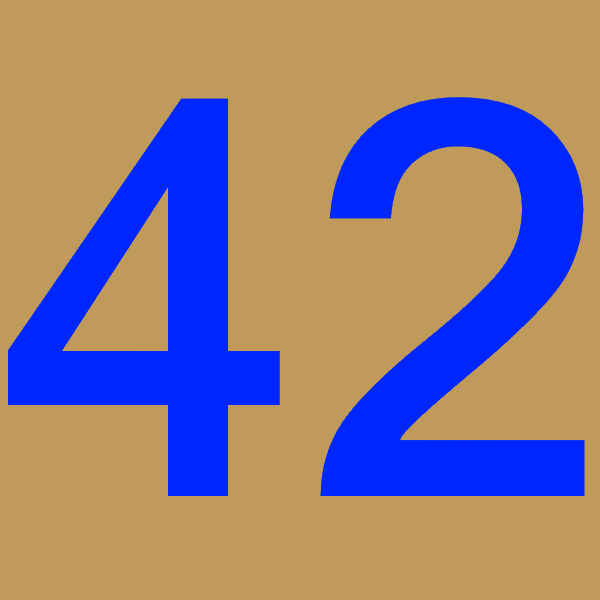
Jackie
Robinson
All MLB
Honored April 15, 1997

The Royals have retired the numbers of former players George Brett (No. 5) and Frank White (No. 20). Former manager Dick Howser's No. 10 was retired following his death in 1987. Former Brooklyn Dodgers player Jackie Robinson's No. 42 is retired throughout Major League Baseball.

==== Out of circulation, but not retired ====
No. 4, worn by Alex Gordon (.257 batting average, 190 home runs, 749 RBI, 8x Gold Glove), has not been assigned since Gordon retired after the 2020 season.

No. 29, worn by Royals greats Dan Quisenberry (238 saves, 2.55 ERA) and Mike Sweeney (.299 batting average, 197 home runs, 837 RBI), has not been assigned since Sweeney's departure in 2007.

No. 30, which was assigned to Yordano Ventura at the time of his death, has not been assigned since aside to Danny Duffy who wore it as a tribute during the 2021 season.

=== Hall of Fame ===
Key
Year	Year inducted
**Bold**	Member of the National Baseball Hall of Fame
†	Member of the Baseball Hall of Fame as a member of the Royals
**Bold**	Recipient of the Hall of Fame's Ford C. Frick Award

**Kansas City Royals Hall of Fame**
Inducted	No.	Player	Position	Tenure
1986	40	Steve Busby	SP	1972–1980
1986	26	Amos Otis	CF	1970–1983
1987	10	Dick Howser	Manager	1981–1986
1987	1	Cookie Rojas	2B	1970–1977
1987	25, 34	Paul Splittorff	SP	1970–1984
1989	22	Dennis Leonard	SP	1974–1986
1989	11	Hal McRae	OF/DH/Coach; Manager	1973–1987; 1991–1994
1992	—	Joe Burke	GM; President	1974–1981; 1981–1992
1992	32, 37	Larry Gura	SP	1976–1985
1992	2, 37	Freddie Patek	SS	1971–1979
1993	—	Ewing Kauffman	Owner and tributary of name of Kauffman Stadium	1969–1993
1994	5, 25	**George Brett**^{†}	3B/DH/1B	1973–1993
1995	19, 20	Frank White	2B	1973–1990
1996	—	Muriel Kauffman	Executive and wife of Ewing	1969–1995
1996	7	John Mayberry	1B	1972–1977
1998	29	Dan Quisenberry	RP	1979–1988
2000	24	**Whitey Herzog**	Manager	1975–1979
2000	6, 19, 32	Willie Wilson	CF/LF	1976–1990
2003	21	Jeff Montgomery	RP	1988–1999
2004	—	**Denny Matthews**^{†}	Radio announcer	1969–present
2005	18, 31	Bret Saberhagen	SP	1984–1991
2006	23	Mark Gubicza	SP	1984–1996
2008	—	Art Stewart	Scout	1969–2021
2011	17, 55	Kevin Appier	SP	1989–1999; 2003–2004
2012	—	George Toma	Groundskeeper	1969–1999
2015	29	Mike Sweeney	C/1B/DH	1995–2007
2023	3	Ned Yost	Manager	2010–2019
2024	16	Bo Jackson	LF	1986–1990
2024	—	Cedric Tallis	GM	1968–1974
2024	—	**John Schuerholz**	GM	1981–1990
2025	4	Alex Gordon	LF	2007–2020
2026	12	John Wathan	C/Coach; Manager	1976–1986; 1987–1991
2027	23	Zack Greinke	SP	2004–2010; 2022–2023
2027	35	Eric Hosmer	1B	2011–2017

== Roster ==
Kansas City Royals 2027 spring training roster
40-man roster		Non-roster invitees	Coaches / other
**Pitchers**: -- Angel Bastardo; 38 Ryan Bergert; 76 Spencer Bivens; -- Lucas Braun; 65 Noah Cameron; 74 José Cuas; 62 Randy Dobnak; 45 Carlos Durán; 60 Lucas Erceg; -- Logan Evans; -- José A. Ferrer; 36 Tony Gonsolin; 34 Anthony Gose; 35 Nolan Hoffman; 59 Ben Kudrna; 67 Seth Lugo; 41 Daniel Lynch IV; -- Bryce Miller; 61 Nate Pearson; 54 Mitch Spence; 50 Connor Thomas; 52 Michael Wacha; 44 Beck Way; 63 Steven Zobac	**Catchers**: 22 Carter Jensen; **Infielders**: 12 Nick Loftin; 19 Michael Massey; 9 Vinnie Pasquantino; 2 Tyler Tolbert; 7 Bobby Witt Jr.; **Outfielders**: 14 Jac Caglianone; 1 Isaac Collins; 28 Kyle Isbel; 24 Matthew Lugo; 16 John Rave; -- Carson Roccaforte; **Designated hitters**: 13 Salvador Perez		**Manager**: 33 Matt Quatraro; **Coaches**: 68 José Alguacil (infield); 70 Connor Dawson (assistant hitting); 80 Allan de San Miguel (bullpen catcher); 82 Miguel Garcia (coach); 83 Juan Graterol (bullpen catcher); 39 Damon Hollins (first base); 49 Paul Hoover (bench); 84 Mike McFerran (assistant pitching); 57 Mitch Stetter (bullpen); 85 Brian Sweeney (pitching); 99 Marcus Thames (assistant hitting); 25 Vance Wilson (third base); 37 Alec Zumwalt (hitting); **60-day injured list**: 58 Luinder Avila; 32 Stephen Kolek; 55 Cole Ragans; **Restricted list**: 64 Steven Cruz; 37 active, 0 inactive, 0 non-roster invitees; 7-, 10-, or 15-day injured list; * Not on active roster; ^{†} Suspended list; Roster, coaches, and NRIs updated November 18, 2026; Transactions • Depth chart; → All MLB rosters

== Managers ==
Statistics current through July 21, 2026

#^{[a]}	Manager	Seasons	Wins	Losses	Pct	PA	PW	PL	WS
1	Joe Gordon^{†}	1969	69	93	.426	—	—	—	—
2	Charlie Metro	1970	19	33	.365	—	—	—	—
3	Bob Lemon^{†}	1970–1972	207	218	.487	—	—	—	—
4	Jack McKeon	1973–1975	215	205	.512	—	—	—	—
5	Whitey Herzog^{†}	1975–1979	410	304	.574	3	5	9	0
6	Jim Frey	1980–1981	127	105	.547	1	5	4	0
7	Dick Howser	1981–1986	404	365	.525	3	8	12	1
8	Mike Ferraro	1986	36	38	.486	—	—	—	—
9	Billy Gardner	1987	62	64	.492	—	—	—	—
10	John Wathan	1987–1991	287	270	.515	—	—	—	—
11	Bob Schaefer	1991	1	0	1.000	—	—	—	—
12	Hal McRae	1991–1994	286	277	.508	—	—	—	—
13	Bob Boone	1995–1997	181	206	.468	—	—	—	—
14	Tony Muser	1997–2002	317	431	.424	—	—	—	—
15	John Mizerock	2002	5	8	.385	—	—	—	—
16	Tony Peña	2002–2005	198	285	.410	—	—	—	—
—	Bob Schaefer	2005	5	12	.294	—	—	—	—
17	Buddy Bell	2005–2007	174	262	.399	—	—	—	—
18	Trey Hillman	2008–2010	152	207	.423	—	—	—	—
19	Ned Yost	2010–2019	687	736	.483	2	22	9	1
20	Mike Matheny	2020–2022	165	219	.430	—	—	—	—
21	Matt Quatraro	2023–present	266	322	.452	1	3	3	0
Totals			4,273	4,660	.478	10	43	37	2

== Minor league affiliations ==
The Kansas City Royals farm system consists of seven minor league affiliates.

Class	Team	League	Location	Ballpark	Affiliated
Triple-A	Omaha Storm Chasers	International League	Papillion, Nebraska	Werner Park	1969
Double-A	Northwest Arkansas Naturals	Texas League	Springdale, Arkansas	Arvest Ballpark	2008
High-A	Quad Cities River Bandits	Midwest League	Davenport, Iowa	Modern Woodmen Park	2021
Single-A	Columbia Fireflies	Carolina League	Columbia, South Carolina	Segra Park	2021
Rookie	ACL Royals	Arizona Complex League	Surprise, Arizona	Surprise Stadium	2022
Rookie	DSL Royals Fortuna	Dominican Summer League	Boca Chica, Santo Domingo	Kansas City Royals Complex	2024
Rookie	DSL Royals Ventura	Dominican Summer League	Boca Chica, Santo Domingo	Kansas City Royals Complex	2024

== Season records ==
- Highest batting average: .390, George Brett (1980)
- Most games: 162, Al Cowens (1977), Hal McRae (1977), Carlos Beltrán (2002), Billy Butler (2013), Alcides Escobar (2014, 2016), Whit Merrifield (2019), Jorge Soler (2019)
- Most runs: 136, Johnny Damon (2000)
- Most hits: 230, Willie Wilson (1980)
- Highest slugging %: .664, George Brett (1980)
- Most doubles: 54, Hal McRae (1977)
- Most triples: 21, Willie Wilson (1985)
- Most home runs: 48, Jorge Soler (2019), Salvador Perez (2021)
- Most grand slams: 3, Danny Tartabull (1988)
- Most RBIs: 144, Mike Sweeney (2000)
- Most stolen bases: 83, Willie Wilson (1979)
- Most wins: 23, Bret Saberhagen (1989)
- Lowest ERA: 2.08, Roger Nelson (1972)
- Strikeouts: 244, Dennis Leonard (1977)
- Most strikeouts, single game: 16, Danny Duffy (2016)
- Most strikeouts, Reliever: 109, Wade Davis (2014)
- Complete games: 21, Dennis Leonard (1977)
- Shutouts: 6, Roger Nelson (1972)
- Saves: 47, Greg Holland (2013)

== All-time records ==
- Highest batting average: .306, George Brett
- Most games: 2,707, George Brett
- Most runs: 1,583, George Brett
- Most hits: 3,154, George Brett
- Highest Slugging %: .518, Danny Tartabull
- Most doubles: 665, George Brett
- Most triples: 137, George Brett
- Most home runs: 318, Salvador Perez
- Most RBIs: 1,596, George Brett
- Most stolen bases: 612, Willie Wilson
- Most wins: 166, Paul Splittorff
- Lowest ERA: 2.55, Dan Quisenberry
- Strikeouts: 1,458, Kevin Appier
- Complete games: 103, Dennis Leonard
- Shutouts: 23, Dennis Leonard
- Saves: 304, Jeff Montgomery
- Largest victory: 21 runs (26–5 win at Tigers in 2004)
- Largest defeat: 21 runs (22–1 loss at White Sox in 2026)

== Radio and television ==
As of 2024, the Royals flagship radio stations are KFNZ-FM (96.5) and KFNZ (610 AM). As KCSP, 610 AM had been carrying games since 2008, and entered into a new four-year deal starting from the 2020 season. The radio announcers are Denny Matthews and Ryan Lefebvre, with Steve Stewart and Steve Physioc.

Starting in 2026, Royals games will be produced and distributed by MLB Local Media under the Royals.TV branding. Prior to that, Royals games were aired on FanDuel Sports Network Kansas City, a branch of FanDuel Sports Network Midwest. For the 2012 season, Ryan Lefebvre was joined by Jeff Montgomery for about 20 games while the rest of the broadcasts were covered by former Angels announcer duo of Rex Hudler and Steve Physioc. During the 2016 season, the Royals averaged an 11.7 rating and 105,000 viewers on primetime TV broadcasts. Selected Royals games previously aired in the 2000s on the Royals Network, and its former flagship was KMCI-TV.

On February 22, 2007, Matthews was selected as the 2007 recipient of the Ford C. Frick Award, presented annually for major contributions to baseball broadcasting.

== Gameday experience ==
Kauffman Stadium is the 5th-oldest active ballpark in Major League Baseball. It features iconic outfield fountains, a Royals Hall of Fame, an 84-foot-wide by 105-foot-tall high-definition digital scoreboard called "CrownVision," a youth field within the Outfield Experience called the "Little K," and a stadium capacity of 37,903.

Fans in Kansas City are known for their pregame tailgating in the parking lot, grilling food, and playing games to get excited to enter the stadium. Some games feature gate giveaways, including bobbleheads, t-shirts, and hats.

Inside the gates, there are activities, food and beverage stands, and activations spread throughout the ballpark during the nine innings of play. The Outfield Experience offers family-friendly activities including a carousel, mini golf, and a playground. Fireworks displays are often held after Friday home games. Hall of Fame mascot Sluggerrr can be seen throughout the game in various places. The stadium has an official team store where fans can purchase merchandise including jerseys, hats, and unique souvenirs.

== Mascot ==
Sluggerrr is the mascot of the Royals. Sluggerrr is a lion, and made his first appearance on April 5, 1996. On game day, Sluggerrr can be found giving aggressive encouragement to players and fans, pitching in the "Little K", and firing hot dogs from an air cannon into the stands between innings.

== See also ==
- Kansas City Royals Baseball Academy
- List of Kansas City Royals seasons
- Sports in the Kansas City metropolitan area

Awards and achievements
Preceded by Detroit Tigers; 1984	World Series champions 1985	Succeeded by New York Mets; 1986
Preceded by San Francisco Giants; 2014	World Series champions 2015	Succeeded by Chicago Cubs; 2016
Preceded by Baltimore Orioles; 1979	American League champions 1980	Succeeded by New York Yankees; 1981
Preceded by Detroit Tigers; 1984	American League champions 1985	Succeeded by Boston Red Sox; 1986
Preceded by Boston Red Sox; 2013	American League champions 2014–2015	Succeeded by Cleveland Indians; 2016
