= Miles Prentice =

American businessman and civic leader (born 1942)

E. Miles Prentice III (born 1942) is an American businessman and civic leader based in New York City. An attorney, he owns several minor league baseball teams and is the chairman of the Center for Security Policy.

== Early life and education ==
Prentice was born in New Jersey and received an AB from Washington & Jefferson College in 1964 and his law degree from the University of Michigan in 1967 and was admitted to the bar in New York in 1973.

In 1999, he was inducted into the Washington & Jefferson Presidents hall of fame as a second baseman for the baseball team in 1961 and 1962. He also played football for four years.

== Career ==
He is a partner at the law firm Eaton & Van Winkle LLP where his specialty is international and domestic commercial and financial law. His Eaton profile says he has extensive experience in the "acquisition of companies, formation of joint enterprises, transfers of technology, financings (through the public markets and privately, including asset and project-based financings) and general operations."

Prentice purchased the Midland Angels after the 1989 season. The 1990 Angels program states that he served in the U.S. Army from 1968 through 1970 and that he was raised in Montpelier, Vermont.

Since the 1990s Prentice has made overtures to buy Major League Baseball teams including the Kansas City Royals, Milwaukee Brewers, Cincinnati Reds, Boston Red Sox and Houston Astros. At least one of his bids foundered due to concerns that he was underfinanced. In 1998, he agreed in principle to buy the Royals for $75 million, fronting a syndicate that included Julia Kauffman, daughter of founding owner Ewing Kauffman. However, the bid collapsed after the commissioner's office expressed concern that Prentice's syndicate was too large and didn’t have enough money behind it. He bid for the Royals again in 2000, but lost to David Glass even though his offer of $120 million was actually larger than Glass' bid. However, the commissioner's office opposed Prentice's bid after concluding he did not have enough net worth to withstand substantial losses.

== Philanthropy and advocacy ==
Prentice is the chairman of the Center for Security Policy, a think tank. The organization has been called "neo-conservative" by the Anti-Defamation League and a "hate group" by the Southern Poverty Law Center for alleged anti-Muslim views. He is a member of the Committee on the Present Danger: China (CPDC).

He funds the Miles and Katharine Culbertson Prentice Distinguished Lecture at Colby College. He is on the board of trustees of Washington & Jefferson College.

== Sports franchises ==
- Norwich Sea Unicorns
- Midland RockHounds (co-owner)
