= David Glass (businessman) =

American businessman (1935–2020)

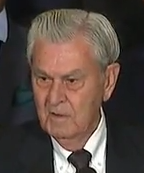
- Glass in 2016
- Born: David Dayne Glass; September 2, 1935; Oregon County, Missouri, U.S.
- Died: January 9, 2020 (aged 84); Bentonville, Arkansas, U.S.
- Education: Southwest Missouri State College (B.S.)
- Occupation: Businessman
- Employer(s): Walmart Stores, Inc. Kansas City Royals
- Predecessor: Sam Walton
- Successor: H. Lee Scott
- Board member of: Wal-Mart; Kansas City Royals
- Spouse: Ruth Glass
- Children: 3

David Dayne Glass (September 2, 1935 – January 9, 2020) was an American businessman. He was president and chief executive officer of Walmart Stores, Inc. He was also an owner and chief executive officer of the Kansas City Royals.

== Early life ==
The son of Marvin Glass and Myrtle Van Winkle, Glass was born on a farm in Oregon County, Missouri, and grew up in Mountain View, Missouri. He served in the United States Army from 1954 through 1956, then attended Southwest Missouri State College (now Missouri State University) in Springfield.

== Career with Walmart ==
David Glass joined the company in 1976. In his position as executive vice president of finance for Wal-Mart Stores, he administered the overall financial and accounting responsibilities of the company prior to his appointment as vice chairman and chief financial officer. He served in that role until 1984 when he was named president and Walmart’s chief operating officer. Along with Rob Walton, in 1985, Glass managed development of Retail Link program, Walmart's proprietary trend-forecasting software. In 1988, he was named Walmart's chief executive officer, stepping down from the position in January 2000. Glass was active in the company's growth from 123 stores in 1976 to its more than 4,000 nationally and internationally in 2005.

Glass was named Retailer of the Year by members of the retail industry in 1986 and 1991 and was inducted into the Retail Hall of Fame in August 2000. Glass was also a member of the board of Wal-Mart Stores, Inc. from 1976 until his death in 2020.

== Career with Kansas City Royals ==
Glass became the interim CEO and chairman of the Royals on September 23, 1993, following the death of his longtime friend, Royals founder Ewing Kauffman. Under Glass' leadership, the board cut the payroll from $41 million to $19 million. During the Major League Baseball strike of 1994–1995, Glass opposed any settlement with the players' union without a salary cap, and supported the use of strike-breaking "replacement" players, despite a court ruling that the use of replacement players violated federal labor law.

On April 18, 2000, Glass became sole owner of the Royals, purchasing the organization from the Kauffman estate for $96 million. The Royals board approved his offer despite a competing bid of $120 million by Miles Prentice. However, MLB rejected Prentice's offer. Even though Prentice offered more money, MLB concluded he did not have enough net worth to withstand substantial losses. With none of Kansas City's wealthy families showing any interest in the Royals (or sports ownership in general), Glass was the only serious bidder who had any interest in keeping the team in town. An original stipulation of the sale was that any profits from Glass' sale of the Royals must go to charity, but that clause expired long before Glass sold the team.

For much of his tenure as owner, Glass was criticized for bringing the same cost-cutting management style he used at Walmart to the Royals. Shortly after assuming sole ownership of the franchise Glass appointed his wife and their three children to the board and important senior management roles with the organization, despite the fact that none of them had any meaningful background in baseball. While his cost-conscious managerial style ensured large profits, the Royals were barely competitive for most of the early part of the new millennium. Glass' management is cited for transforming the Royals from a perennial playoff contender in the 1970s and 1980s to one of the worst teams in Major League Baseball during the 1990s and early 2000s.

Glass created a controversy on June 9, 2006, by revoking the press credentials of two reporters who had earlier asked pointed questions to Royals management. The move to avoid criticism infuriated many within the press and led to a backlash of articles that extended far beyond the Kansas City sports community.

The Royals had four winning seasons during his ownership: 2003, 2013, 2014 and 2015. In 2014, the Royals won 89 games and reached the 2014 Major League Baseball Playoffs for the first time in 29 years. They advanced to the World Series for the first time since 1985. The Royals finished the following year with the best regular-season record in the American League, and a second consecutive victory in its championship series. The Royals then defeated the New York Mets in 5 games to win its first World Series championship since 1985.

In August 2019, Glass agreed to sell the team to Cleveland Indians vice chairman John Sherman, pending approval from Major League Baseball and its remaining owners. In November 2019, Glass officially sold the team to Sherman.

== Personal life ==
Glass and his wife, Ruth, were the parents of three children, Dan, Don and Dayna, all of whom served on the Royals' board of directors.

Glass died of complications from pneumonia in Bentonville, Arkansas, on January 9, 2020, at the age of 84. His death was announced on January 17.

Glass Hall at Missouri State University, which houses business and management classes, is named after him.

Business positions
Preceded by Sam Walton	President of Wal-Mart; 1984–2000	Succeeded by Lee Scott
