= J. J. Picollo =

American professional baseball executive (born 1970)

Kansas City Royals
- General Manager/ Executive Vice President
- Born: December 10, 1970 (age 55)

Teams
- Atlanta Braves (1999–2006); Kansas City Royals (2006–present)

John J. Picollo (born December 10, 1970) is an American professional baseball executive. He is the general manager and president of baseball operations for the Kansas City Royals of Major League Baseball. Picollo has been employed with the Royals since 2006.

== Biography ==
Picollo is from Cherry Hill, New Jersey. He graduated from Cherry Hill High School West in 1989. He enrolled at North Carolina State University, where he played college baseball as a catcher for the NC State Wolfpack. He transferred to George Mason University to complete his college baseball career with the George Mason Patriots. Though the Cincinnati Reds selected Picollo in two MLB drafts, Picollo did not sign with the Reds. Undrafted after his senior year at George Mason as a result of elbow injuries, Picollo played in five games for the Oneonta Yankees, the Low-A affiliate of the New York Yankees, in 1994.

In 1999, Picollo joined the Atlanta Braves as a scout. When the Kansas City Royals hired Dayton Moore as their general manager in 2006, Moore's first hire was Picollo, naming him director of player development. The Royals promoted Moore to team president and Picollo to general manager in September 2021. Picollo assumed the role of general manager and president of baseball operations when Moore was fired in September 2022. On February 17, 2025, Picollo signed a contract extension with the Royals that runs through the 2030 season and includes a club option for the 2031 campaign.

Preceded by Dayton Moore	Kansas City Royals General manager 2022–present	Succeeded by Current
