= List of Kansas City Royals owners and executives =

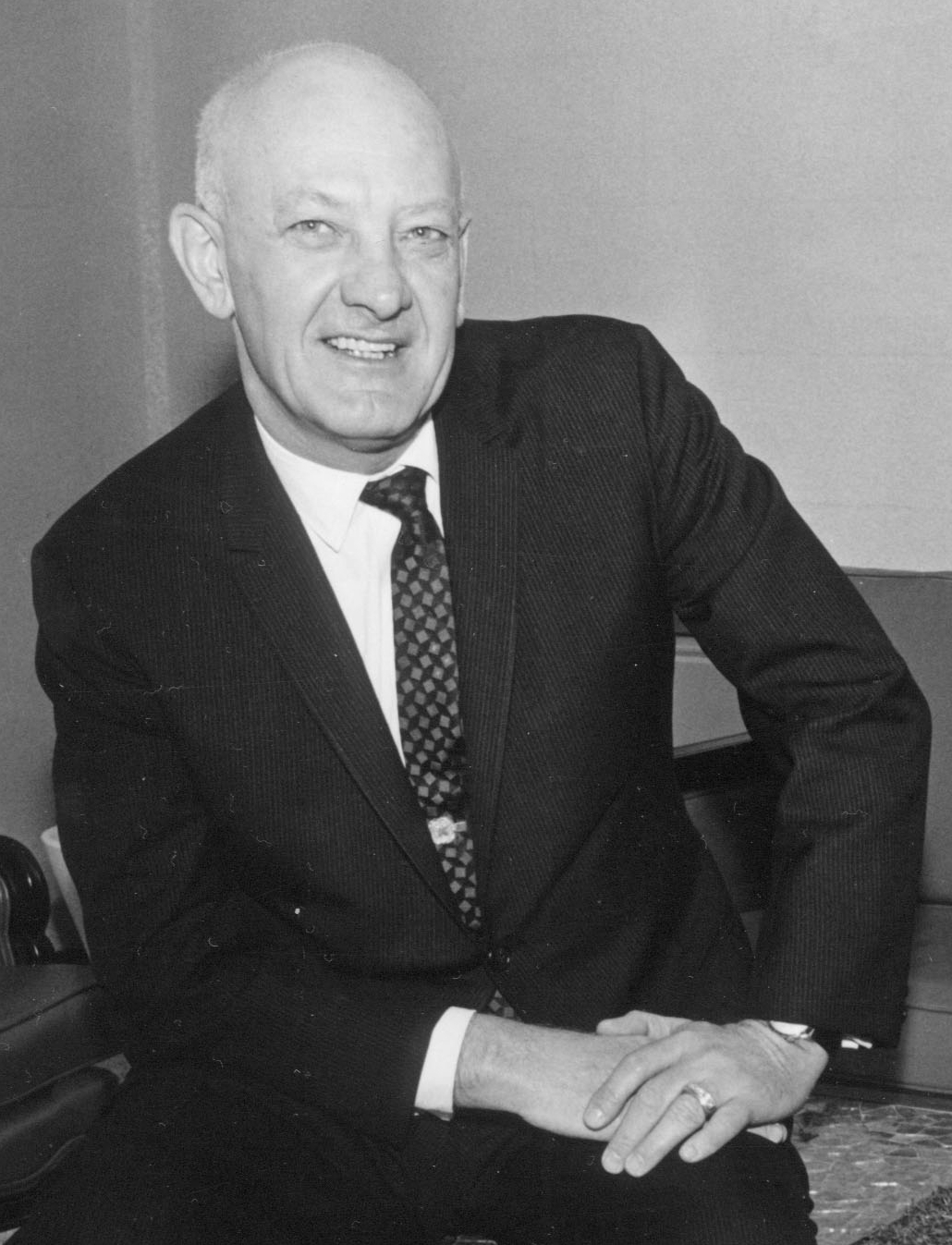
Ewing Kauffman

The Kansas City Royals baseball team is currently owned by an ownership group led by John Sherman. The franchise was first established by Ewing Kauffman in 1967.

== Owners ==
- Ewing Kauffman (1967—1993)
  - Avron Fogelman (1983—1991, part owner)
- Ewing Kauffman estate (1993—2000)
- David Glass (2000—2019)
- John Sherman (2020—present, majority owner)
  - Alan Atterbury
  - Karen Daniel
  - Dan Dees
  - Mark Demetree
  - The Dunn Family
  - Paul Edgerly
  - Bill Gautreaux
  - Mike Haverty
  - J. B. Hebenstreit
  - Carl Hughes
  - Rob Kaplan
  - Mariner Kemper
  - The Lockton Family
  - Patrick Mahomes
  - Peter and Veronica Mallouk
  - Terry Matlack
  - Kent McCarthy
  - Jay Pack
  - PJM Baseball, LLC
  - PlayBallKC, LLC
  - Seventh Inning Stretch, LLC
  - Brooks Sherman
  - Eric Stonestreet
  - Don Wagner

== General Managers ==
- Cedric Tallis (1968—1974)
- Joe Burke (1974—1981)
- John Schuerholz (1981—1990)
- Herk Robinson (1990—2000)
- Allard Baird (2000—2006)
- Dayton Moore (2007—2021)
- J. J. Picollo (2022—present)

== Other executives ==
- Larry Doughty
- Dan Glass
- Lou Gorman
- Michael E. Herman
- Joe Klein
- Art Stewart
- Dean Taylor
