= Jim Frey =

American baseball manager (1931–2020)

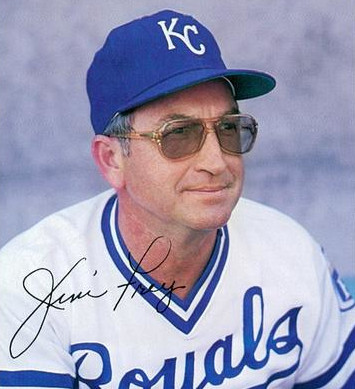
- Frey in 1980
- Manager
- Born: May 26, 1931; Cleveland, Ohio, U.S.
- Died: April 12, 2020 (aged 88); Ponte Vedra Beach, Florida, U.S.
- Batted: Left Threw: Left

Career statistics
- Managerial record: 323–287–1
- Winning %: .530
- Stats at Baseball Reference
- Managerial record at Baseball Reference

Teams
- As manager: Kansas City Royals (1980–1981); Chicago Cubs (1984–1986); As coach: Baltimore Orioles (1970–1979); New York Mets (1982–1983)

Career highlights and awards
- World Series champion (1970); NL Manager of the Year (1984)

James Gottfried Frey (May 26, 1931 – April 12, 2020) was an American professional baseball manager, coach, general manager, and Minor League Baseball (MiLB) outfielder. In 1980, Frey led the Kansas City Royals of Major League Baseball (MLB) to their first American League (AL) championship, in his first year with the team. In the World Series, they lost to the Philadelphia Phillies, who won their first World Series championship.

== Early career ==
Frey was born in Cleveland, Ohio. He was attended Western Hills High School in Cincinnati, Ohio alongside his lifelong friend Don Zimmer. A left-handed batting-and-throwing outfielder, Frey spent much of his career in the farm systems of the Boston/Milwaukee Braves and St. Louis Cardinals. A recurring arm injury prevented him from his best shot at the big leagues, in 1958.

Following the end of Frey's playing career in 1963, he joined the Baltimore Orioles as a scout and MiLB manager. Frey was promoted to the MLB Orioles' coaching staff under Earl Weaver, in 1970, and coached on three AL pennant winners and one World Series champion through 1979. Jim Palmer called him "one of the great fielder-mover-arounders of all time."

== Kansas City Royals ==
A week after the end of the 1979 World Series on October 24, Frey was named to succeed Whitey Herzog as manager of the Kansas City Royals. He led the Royals to a 97–65 mark and the American League West Division title in 1980; then, in the 1980 American League Championship Series, the Royals swept their long-time postseason nemesis, the New York Yankees, in three straight games to capture the AL title. This served as some sort of revenge for the Yankees having defeated Herzog's Royals for three consecutive seasons (1976–78) in the ALCS. However, the Royals dropped the World Series to the Philadelphia Phillies in six games. Frey's use of seven pitchers for the whole Series led to short runs for their starters that meant they could not pitch efficiently despite batting .290 in the Series.

During the strike-marred 1981 season, in which the Royals finished the first half with a 20–30 record, Frey was criticized widely for not taking full advantage of a team built for speed and for failing to motivate his players by Kansas City vice president/general manager Joe Burke. Frey was relieved of his duties on August 31, despite the 10–10 ballclub leading the second-half American League West standings. His replacement was Dick Howser, who had lost his managerial job with the Yankees after the previous year's ALCS. Frey's record in just less than two seasons as Royals manager was 127–105.

== Chicago Cubs ==
Frey then returned to the coaching ranks as the hitting coach for the New York Mets from 1982 to 1983. Nicknamed “Preacher Man”, Frey was hired by the Chicago Cubs as their manager for the 1984 season. Ryne Sandberg (approaching his fourth season in the majors) cited Frey as key to shaping his mindset when it came to driving the baseball and his timing on certain pitches (after Frey noticed Sandberg's approach during spring training games that year), which saw him win the NL MVP (among other awards) that year on the road to a Hall of Fame career. As for the Cubs, they won the division title, earning their first post-season appearance since the 1945 World Series. During the clubhouse celebration following the division-clinching in Pittsburgh, Frey declared, "The monkey's off our back!"

The Cubs won the first two games against the San Diego Padres in the 1984 National League Championship Series at Wrigley Field, before they went to San Diego needing to win just one of the next three games. The Cubs were then blown out in Game 3, which was then followed by the decision by Frey to not have Rick Sutcliffe (who had gone 16–1 since being acquired by the Cubs midseason) pitch four days after winning Game 1 in a move apparently decided not long before Game 4 was to begin, with an idea to save Sutcliffe for either the next game of the series or Game 1 of a potential World Series. Instead, Frey went with starter Scott Sanderson on the mound, which saw him give up three runs in four innings, but the Cubs had rallied with two runs in the eighth to tie the game. In the bottom of the ninth, closer Lee Smith gave up a one-out base hit and then gave up a walk off two-run home run from Steve Garvey to force a Game 5. With Rick Sutcliffe on the mound, the Cubs led 3–0 after the end of five innings. In the sixth, Sutcliffe gave up two hits along with a walk before two sacrifice flies gave the Padres two runs before the end of the inning. Sutcliffe was sent out to pitch the seventh inning, which spiraled into disaster that saw the Padres score four runs in the inning before Sutcliffe was finally pulled. By the end of the game, the Padres had won 6–3. Many critics blamed Frey for mishandling the pitching staff, although the 1984 Cubs are revered among Cubs fans. Baseball historian Bill James called Frey in 1997 the "dumbest manager I had ever met" along with stating that his success with the Royals and Cubs happened as "He was what those teams needed at that time -- not a guy who could play percentages or teach young men to play baseball, but a guy who could keep a veteran team in a positive frame of mind for a few months. All teams are different; all managers are different."

The 1985 season would be particularly trying for the team, in which the entire five-man starting rotation simultaneously spent time on the disabled list. Cubs media relations director Bob Ibach later related that when it was suggested to Frey to turn Dennis Eckersley into a relief pitcher due to his velocity dropping after the fourth inning, he was quoted as saying “There’s no (bleepin’) way he'll ever be a (bleepin’) relief pitcher” (in 1987, traded to Oakland, Eckersley would soon be a star relief closer). After a finish of 77–84 in 1985, the bottom fell out in 1986. Frey was fired two months into the season and replaced by John Vukovich. The next year, Frey surfaced as a color commentator on the Cubs' WGN Radio broadcasts, which Cubs general manager Dallas Green later felt was a move made by Tribune Company as preparation to replace Green.

On November 11, 1987, Tribune hired Frey to replace his old boss in Green in serving as director of baseball operations. Frey hired his lifelong friend, Zimmer, to manage the team, and immediately made his presence felt. Within weeks of his hiring, Frey dealt relief pitcher Lee Smith to Boston for journeyman pitchers Al Nipper and Calvin Schiraldi, the latter of whom was best known for playing a part in the Red Sox' 1986 World Series collapse. Frey also traded the popular Keith Moreland to San Diego for closer Goose Gossage, who had played a big part on the Padres team that eliminated the Cubs, four years earlier. Neither move worked, and the Cubs were without a closer. Before November 1987, Frey informed Gordon Goldsberry, the director of player development and scouting (as hired by Green in 1981), that he would not have his contract renewed; the move was stated to have hurt the farm system, as he also let go of a number of scouts.

Frey made a bold move in the winter of 1988, trading budding star Rafael Palmeiro and young pitcher Jamie Moyer to the Texas Rangers for a number of players, including Mitch Williams. The trade appeared to pay off for the Cubs with respect to the 1989 season as Williams saved 36 games, the Cubs won a division title and Moyer and Palmeiro struggled in Texas. But Williams had just one more forgettable year for the Cubs before being traded to Philadelphia in 1991, and Palmeiro and Moyer went on to have productive careers. Following the 1989 campaign, Frey was named co-Executive of the Year by United Press International (UPI).

After a disappointing 1990 season, Frey was active on the free agent market, acquiring former Toronto Blue Jay and 1987 American League MVP George Bell, former Cincinnati Reds starting pitcher Danny Jackson, and former Houston Astros closer Dave Smith. Jackson and Smith flopped in their roles in 1991, and Zimmer was fired – apparently on orders from Tribune Co. CEO Donald Grenesko, in May 1991. Jim Essian, a former journeyman catcher and Iowa Cubs manager, replaced Zimmer for the remainder of the season. Frey was reassigned within the organization after the 1991 season, and was replaced by former Chicago White Sox general manager Larry Himes. He left baseball in 1992, citing a feeling of being worn out after 43 years in the game.

== Managerial record ==
Team	Year	Regular season					Postseason			
Team	Year	Games	Won	Lost	Win %	Finish	Won	Lost	Win %	Result
KC	1980	162	97	65	.599	1st in AL Central	5	4	.556	Lost World Series (PHI)
KC	1981	50	20	30	.400	5th in AL Central	–	–	–	–
KC	1981	20	10	10	.500	Fired	–	–	–	–
KC total		232	127	105	.547		5	4	.556	
CHC	1984	161	96	65	.596	1st in NL East	2	3	.400	Lost NLCS (SD)
CHC	1985	162	77	84	.478	4th in NL East	–	–	–	–
CHC	1986	56	23	33	.411	Fired	–	–	–	–
CHC total		379	196	182	.519		2	3	.400	
Total		611	323	287	.530		7	7	.500	

== Retirement and death ==
Later on, Frey became Vice Chairman of the Independent Somerset Patriots of the Atlantic League of Professional Baseball, being a key figure in the team's early years. He died in Ponte Vedra, Florida, on April 12, 2020, at the age of 88, survived by his wife of 68 years and his four children.

Sporting positions
Preceded by Charley Lau	Baltimore Orioles Hitting Coach; 1970–1977	Succeeded by Frank Robinson
Preceded by Charley Lau	Baltimore Orioles Bullpen Coach; 1970–1975	Succeeded by Cal Ripken Sr.
Preceded by George Staller	Baltimore Orioles First Base Coach; 1976–1979	Succeeded by Frank Robinson
Preceded by Charlie Fox	Chicago Cubs Manager; 1984–1986	Succeeded by John Vukovich
Preceded by Dallas Green	Chicago Cubs General Manager; 1988–1991	Succeeded by Larry Himes
