= Andy MacPhail =

American baseball executive (born 1953)

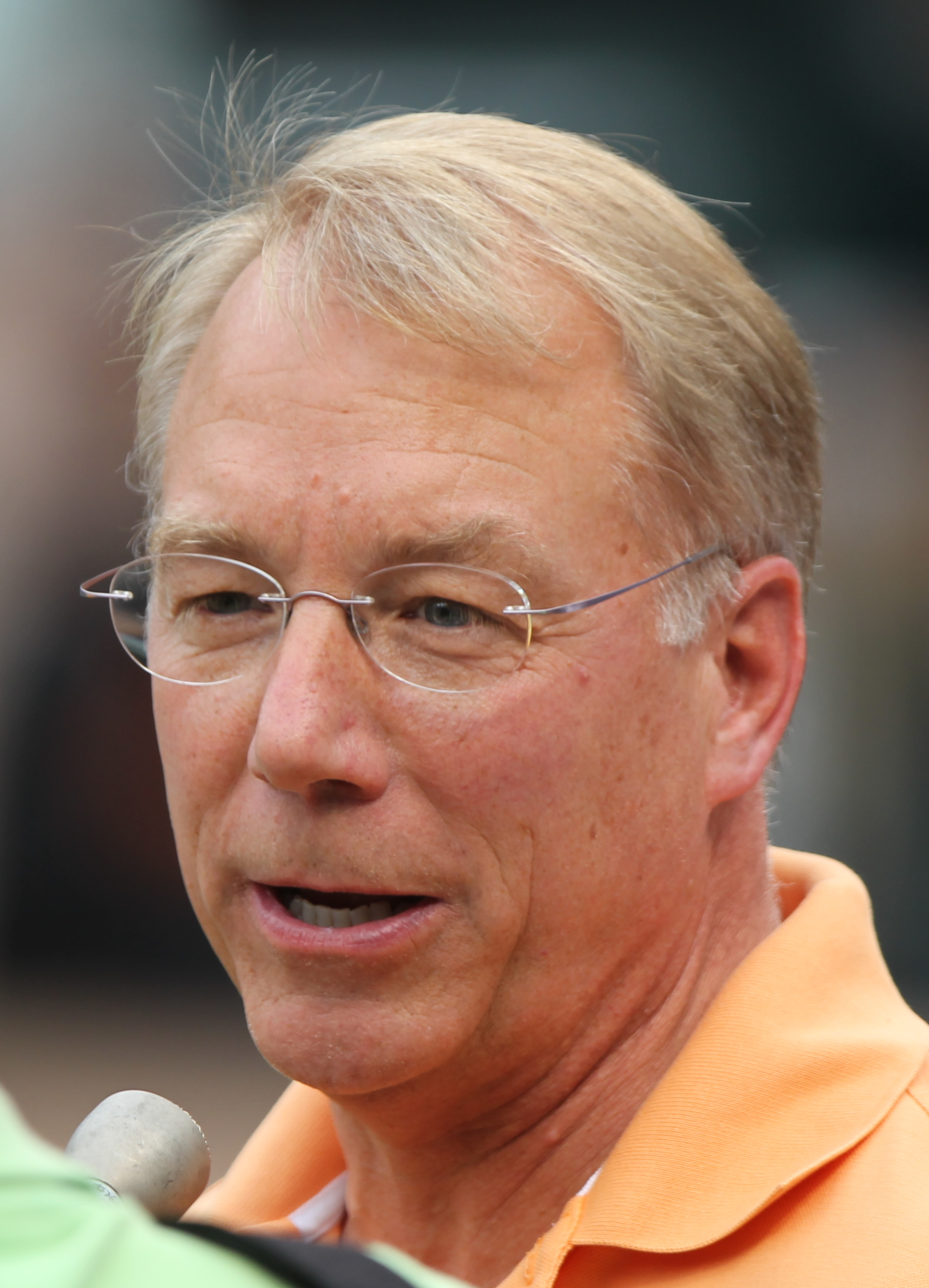
- MacPhail in June 2011
- General manager / Executive
- Born: April 5, 1953 (age 73); United States

Teams
- As general manager: Minnesota Twins (1985–1994); Chicago Cubs (2000–2001); Baltimore Orioles (2007–2011); As president: Chicago Cubs (1995–2006); Philadelphia Phillies (2015–2020)

Career highlights and awards
- 2× World Series champion (1987, 1991); Sporting News Executive of the Year (1991); Minnesota Twins Hall of Fame

Andrew Bowen MacPhail (born April 5, 1953) is an American baseball executive. He has previously served as general manager for the Minnesota Twins and Chicago Cubs, and as president for the Baltimore Orioles and Philadelphia Phillies.

MacPhail is the son of Lee MacPhail and the grandson of Larry MacPhail, both of whom were inducted into the National Baseball Hall of Fame for their careers as executives in MLB.

== Career ==
MacPhail began his career as a baseball executive with the Chicago Cubs' Rookie-level Minor League Baseball affiliate in 1976. After a year in the role, he became an assistant in the Cubs' parks operations department, and was promoted to assistant director of player development. He joined the front office of the Houston Astros of Major League Baseball as their assistant director of scouting in 1981, and then was promoted to assistant to the general manager in 1982. He was hired as the Minnesota Twins' vice president of player development in 1984, and then as the Twins' general manager in 1985. As the Twins' general manager, he hired Tom Kelly to serve as the team's field manager, and traded for Jeff Reardon, Dan Gladden, Joe Niekro, and Dan Schatzeder. Under MacPhail, the Twins won the 1987 World Series and 1991 World Series championships. The 1991 Twins rebounded from a last place finish after MacPhail signed Jack Morris in the offseason. MacPhail won Sporting News' Executive of the Year Award in 1991.

At the end of the 1994 season, the Cubs hired MacPhail as their president and chief executive officer. MacPhail demoted Larry Himes, the Cubs' general manager, and hired Ed Lynch to fill the role. The Cubs reached the playoffs when they won the National League wild card spot in 1998. They won the National League Central division in 2003. MacPhail served with the Cubs until the end of the 2006 season, when he stepped down and was succeeded by John McDonough.

Peter Angelos, the owner of the Baltimore Orioles, hired MacPhail as the team's president of baseball operations on June 20, 2007. Before the 2008 season, MacPhail traded Érik Bédard for a package that included Adam Jones and Chris Tillman. He acquired J. J. Hardy after the 2010 season and Chris Davis and Tommy Hunter at the trade deadline in 2011. He also hired Buck Showalter as manager during the 2010 season. MacPhail's contract expired at the end of the 2011 season, following the Orioles' 14th consecutive losing season, and he opted to leave the team. Many of the players acquired by MacPhail, as well as Showalter, helped the Orioles reach the postseason after MacPhail's departure.

On June 29, 2015, the Philadelphia Phillies hired MacPhail as a special assistant to Pat Gillick, the team's president. MacPhail succeeded Gillick as president at the end of the 2015 season. On December 11, 2020, he was succeeded by David Dombrowski.

== Personal ==
MacPhail is the youngest of four sons born to Lee MacPhail, who served as president of the American League. He is the grandson of Larry MacPhail, who with Lee forms the only father-and-son members of the Baseball Hall of Fame. Andy's uncle, Bill MacPhail (Lee MacPhail's brother), was president of CBS Sports and later was president of CNN Sports.

MacPhail graduated with a degree in American studies from Dickinson College in Carlisle, Pennsylvania, in 1977, where he was a member of Kappa Sigma fraternity. He played college baseball as an outfielder for Dickinson at the Division III level.

Preceded by Howard Fox	Minnesota Twins General Manager; 1985–1994	Succeeded by Terry Ryan
Preceded by Ed Lynch	Chicago Cubs General Manager; 2000–2001	Succeeded by Jim Hendry
Preceded by Don Grenesko	Chicago Cubs President and CEO; 1994–2006	Succeeded by John McDonough (interim)
Preceded by new position	Baltimore Orioles President of Baseball Operations; 2007–2011	Succeeded by Dan Duquette
