= Syd Thrift =

American baseball executive (1929-2006)

- Born: February 25, 1929; Locust Hill, Virginia, U.S.
- Died: September 18, 2006 (aged 77); Milford, Delaware, U.S.

Sydnor W. Thrift Jr. (February 25, 1929 – September 18, 2006) was an American scout and executive in Major League Baseball who served as the general manager of the Pittsburgh Pirates from 1985 to 1988, and the de facto general manager of the Baltimore Orioles from 1999 to 2002. During a 50-year career in professional baseball, he also spent time as a player, scout, or executive with the New York Yankees, Chicago Cubs, Oakland Athletics, and Kansas City Royals.

== Early career ==
Thrift was born in Locust Hill, Middlesex County, Virginia, part of the historic Middle Peninsula area, where his mother and father ran a general merchandise store. He graduated from Syringa High School in 1945 and from Randolph-Macon College in 1949. He joined the United States Army in January 1951 during the Korean War and served for two years. While in the army, he was stationed at Fort Eustis, Virginia, where he played and coached for the base team the Wheels.

While working as high school teacher and coach from 1953 to 1956, Thift was a part-time scout for the New York Yankees and Pittsburgh Pirates, becoming the Pirates' scouting supervisor in 1957. He left the Pirates after the 1967 season to join the Kansas City Royals as scouting director and in 1970 founded the Kansas City Royals Baseball Academy. Renowned for its player development, the academy produced 14 major league players. After two years with the Oakland Athletics, he owned and operated Syd Thrift and Associates, a real-estate business based in Vienna, Virginia.

== Return to baseball ==
Thrift had been out of baseball for nine years when he was the surprise choice on November 7, 1985, to succeed Joe L. Brown as vice president and general manager of baseball operations with the Pirates which was under new ownership. He hired a relatively unknown Jim Leyland, then the Chicago White Sox third base coach, as manager. Together they turned the last place Pirates around and by 1988 the club finished second to the New York Mets, which was considered by some a miracle. Thrift's management and personnel decisions were later widely attributed for the team's subsequent success, as they won National League Eastern Division titles from 1990 through 1992. He also had a contentious relationship with the team's investors. He signed a two-year $400,000 contract that gave him the final say on all baseball-related decisions on October 26, 1987, three days after winning a power struggle that resulted in the resignation of Malcolm Prine as club president. The following year on October 4, 1988, the Pirates board of directors unanimously voted to oust Thrift who was at odds with board chairman Douglas Danforth and team president Carl Barger.

In March 1989, Thrift became the Yankees' vice president of baseball operations, signing a five-year contract. In June, George Steinbrenner ordered Thrift and the scouts to stop traveling to evaluate talent as a cost-saving measure. Thrift resigned from the Yankees on August 30.

Thrift also served as a consultant to the New York Mets, Los Angeles Dodgers, San Francisco Giants and Tampa Bay Devil Rays. In 1990 he and sports writer Barry Shapiro wrote his autobiography, The Game According to Syd: The Theories and Teachings of Baseball's Leading Innovator.

Thrift was hired by the Chicago Cubs as assistant to general manager Larry Himes on December 2, 1991. He left the Cubs on October 18, 1994, when Himes' successor Ed Lynch elected not to renew his contract.

== Baltimore Orioles ==
Thrift was put in charge of the minor league operations of the Baltimore Orioles upon his appointment as the team's director of player development thirteen days later on October 31, 1994. He succeeded Doug Melvin who had left the Orioles earlier that month to become general manager of the Texas Rangers. He was promoted to vice president of baseball operations on December 21, 1999, succeeding Frank Wren who had been relieved of his general manager duties two months prior. Wren had alleged that Thrift used his influence with team owner Peter Angelos to get him fired.

Thrift's time with the Orioles ended on December 4, 2002, when both Jim Beattie and Mike Flanagan assumed his duties. By then, the Orioles had its fifth straight losing season, its top three minor-league affiliates finished a combined 109 games below .500 and the Rochester Red Wings ended a 42-year affiliation.

== Legacy ==
Thrift brought a fresh eye to evaluating talent and building teams. Rickey Henderson, Frank White, Al Oliver and Bobby Bonilla were among the notable players originally scouted or signed by Thrift. In 2015, Syd Thrift Athletic Complex at the Middlesex High School was opened in his honor.

== Retirement ==
After retiring from baseball in 2004, he settled in Kilmarnock, Virginia, and was the co-host of a syndicated radio program sponsored by Major League Baseball. He was honored by The Sporting News as one of the best teachers in baseball. He received an honorary doctorate of laws by Randolph-Macon College and their Distinguished Alumnus Award. In 1995 he was presented with the Edwin Rommel Award for his years of contribution to the sport of baseball. In 1996 he was inducted into the Middle Atlantic Major League Baseball Scouts Hall of Fame. And in 1998 he was inducted into the Virginia Sports Hall of Fame and the Randolph-Macon College Athletic Hall of Fame.

== Death ==
Thrift died September 18, 2006, at Milford Memorial Hospital in Milford, Delaware, at age 77 following apparent complications from knee replacement surgery earlier that day. Survivors included his wife, Dolly Thrift; two sons; and five grandchildren.

Sporting positions
Preceded by Joe L. Brown	Pittsburgh Pirates General manager 1985–1988	Succeeded by Larry Doughty
Preceded by Frank Wren	Baltimore Orioles General manager 1999–2002	Succeeded by Mike Flanagan (as Vice-president of Baseball Operations) and Jim Beattie (as Executive Vice-president of Baseball Operations)
