= Ewing and Muriel Kauffman Memorial Garden =

Botanic garden in Kansas City, Missouri, United States

Coordinates: 39.0396°N 94.5794°W

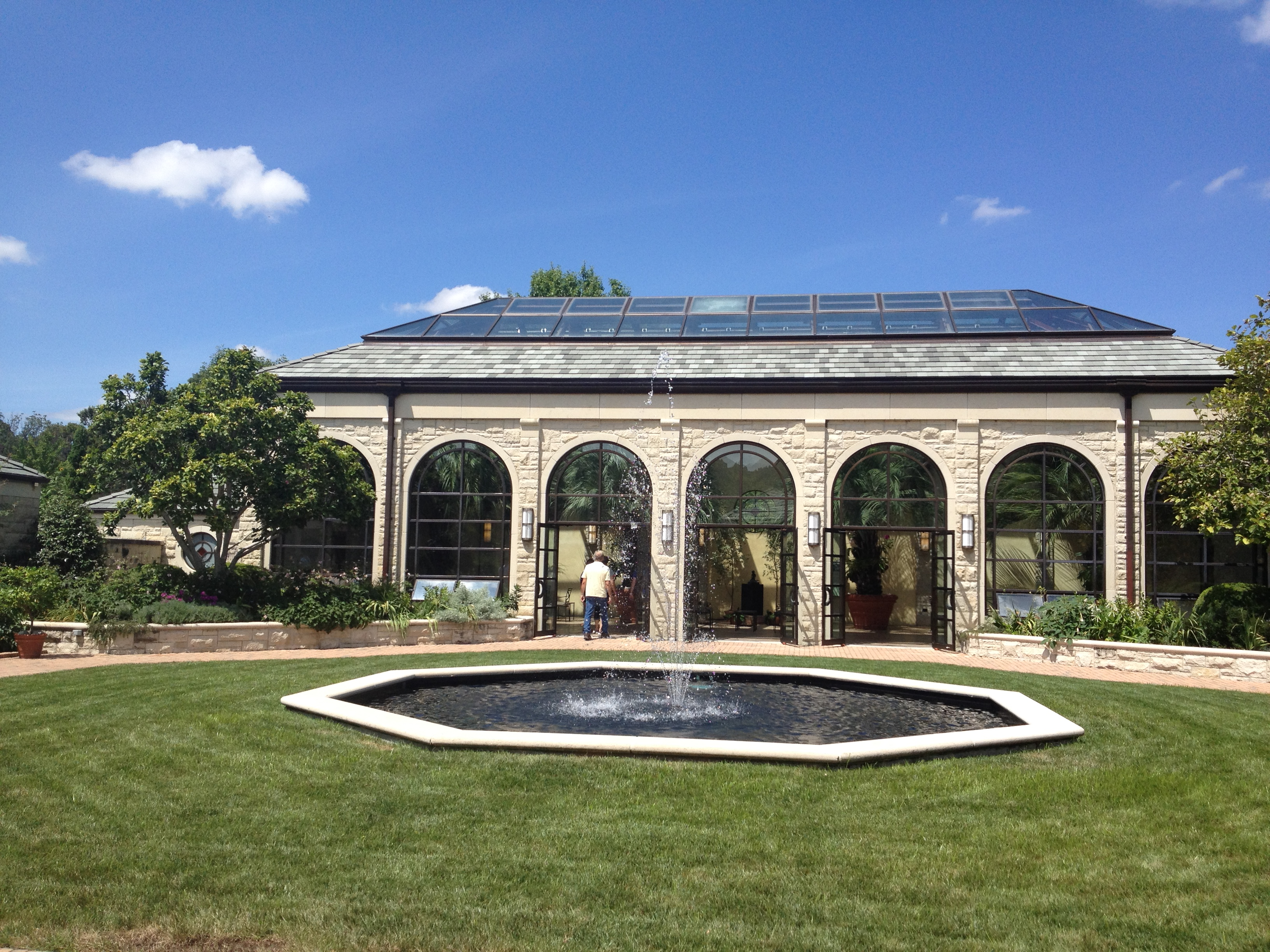
- Interactive map of Ewing and Muriel Kauffman Memorial Garden
- Website: Official website

The Ewing and Muriel Kauffman Memorial Garden is a 2-acre botanic garden and part of the Kauffman Legacy Park, located in Kansas City, Missouri. It is maintained by the Muriel McBrien Kauffman Family Foundation. The gardens are located near Country Club Plaza and the main campus of University of Missouri–Kansas City. The Kauffman Memorial Garden is enclosed by limestone walls and has brick paths and seating areas. The garden showcases five designs.

== Five Designs ==
The Allee: Peking Tree Lilacs shading billowing blue Endless Summer Hydrangeas and other seasonal flowers are found in the entrance of the garden. Allee is a French word meaning, "a walkway lined with trees or tall shrubs."

Green Garden: The Green Garden’s centerpiece is where water jumps in a playful octagonal pool. It is bordered on the south by a pergola of overhead planter boxes filled with cascading seasonal flowers that create a space where Mrs. Kauffman’s favorite flower, the gardenia, can be found during the growing season. Four beds surround each corner of the garden containing spring-blooming magnolias.

Orangery: The “orangery” flanks the north side of the green garden and offers a sheltered gathering place for visitors and a site for seasonal plants, and in winter, the garden's citrus, camellia and gardenia collections. The garden's orchid collection can also be found in the "boots" of the orangery's two large pindo palm trees.

Parterre Garden: The Parterre “Canal” Garden is home to a long pool, where bronze figures Jazz I and Jazz II, by local artist Tom Corbin dance in the water. The long canal pool is lined with a colorful display of annuals and tropicals that change with each season. Paths behind rows of flowering crabapples feature long borders of perennials.

Secret Garden: The secluded Secret Garden behind the conservatory features its own distinctive watery accents and a quiet spot for reflection.

== Memorial ==
The Memorial site of Kansas City business and philanthropists Ewing Kauffman and Muriel Kauffman are interred at the garden. The Kauffmans’ world travels inspired the creation of the garden for the enjoyment and enrichment of the community. The space artfully includes plants from both Muriel and Ewing’s heritage by using species popular to Canada and Missouri.

All together, the garden features 7,000 plants, varieties that include vintage and modern perennials, annuals, shrubs, bulbs and trees. Local volunteers and gardeners, in association with Powell Gardens are responsible for daily care.

== Gallery ==
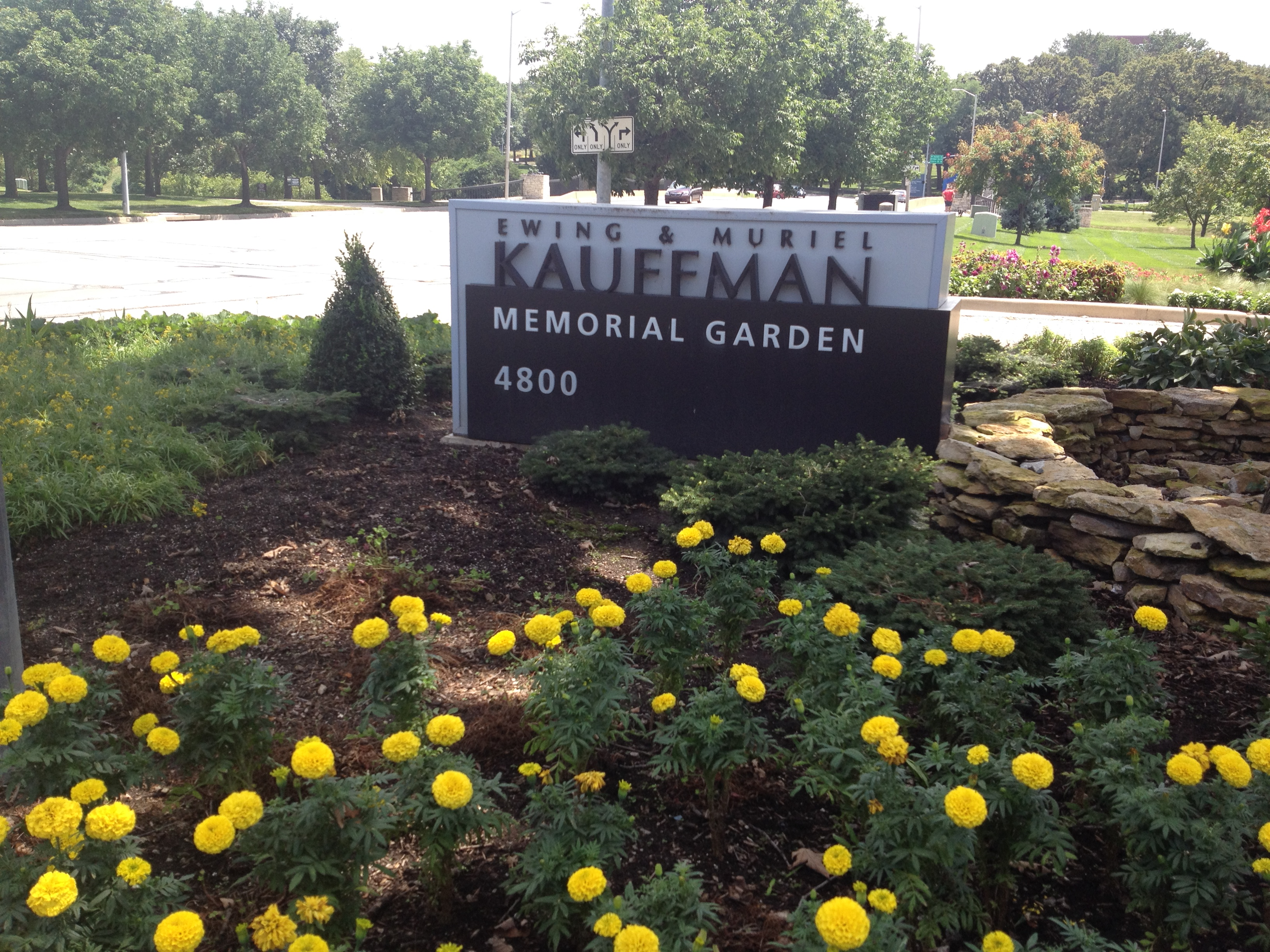
Entrance to the Ewing and Muriel Kauffman Memorial Garden from the East

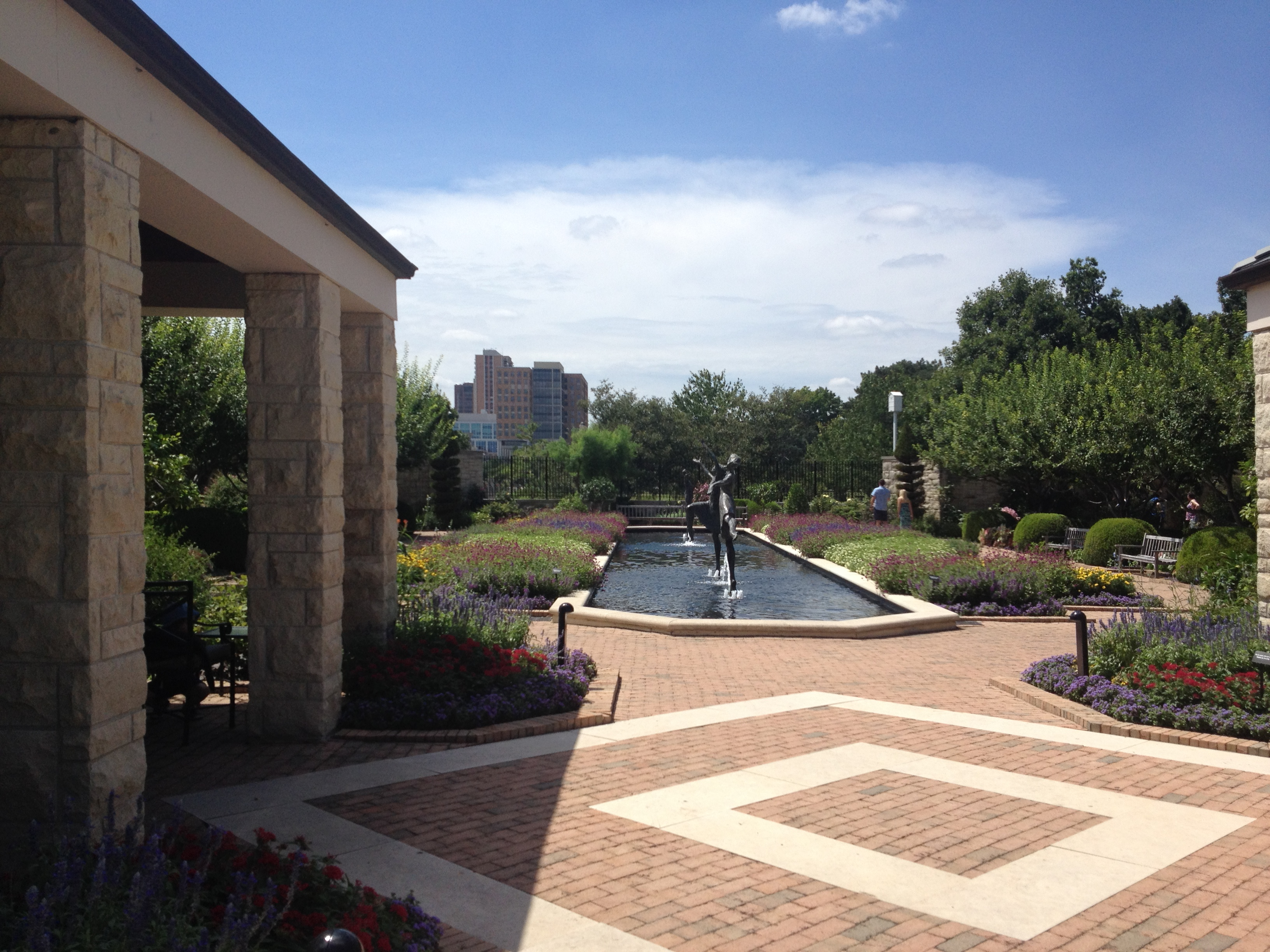
Ewing and Muriel Kauffman Memorial Garden (west view from center court)

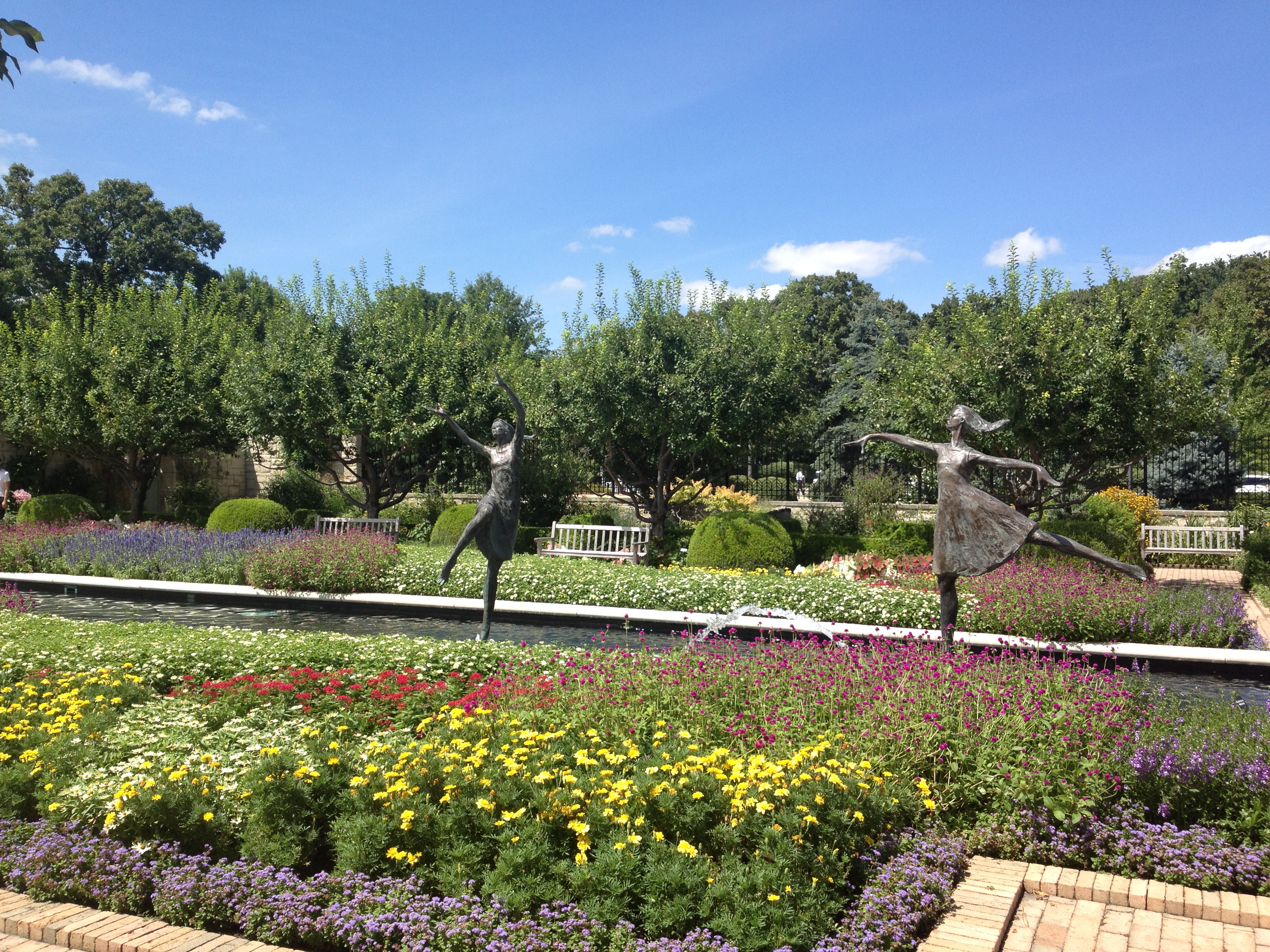
Ewing and Muriel Kauffman Memorial Garden view of west fountains from south walkway

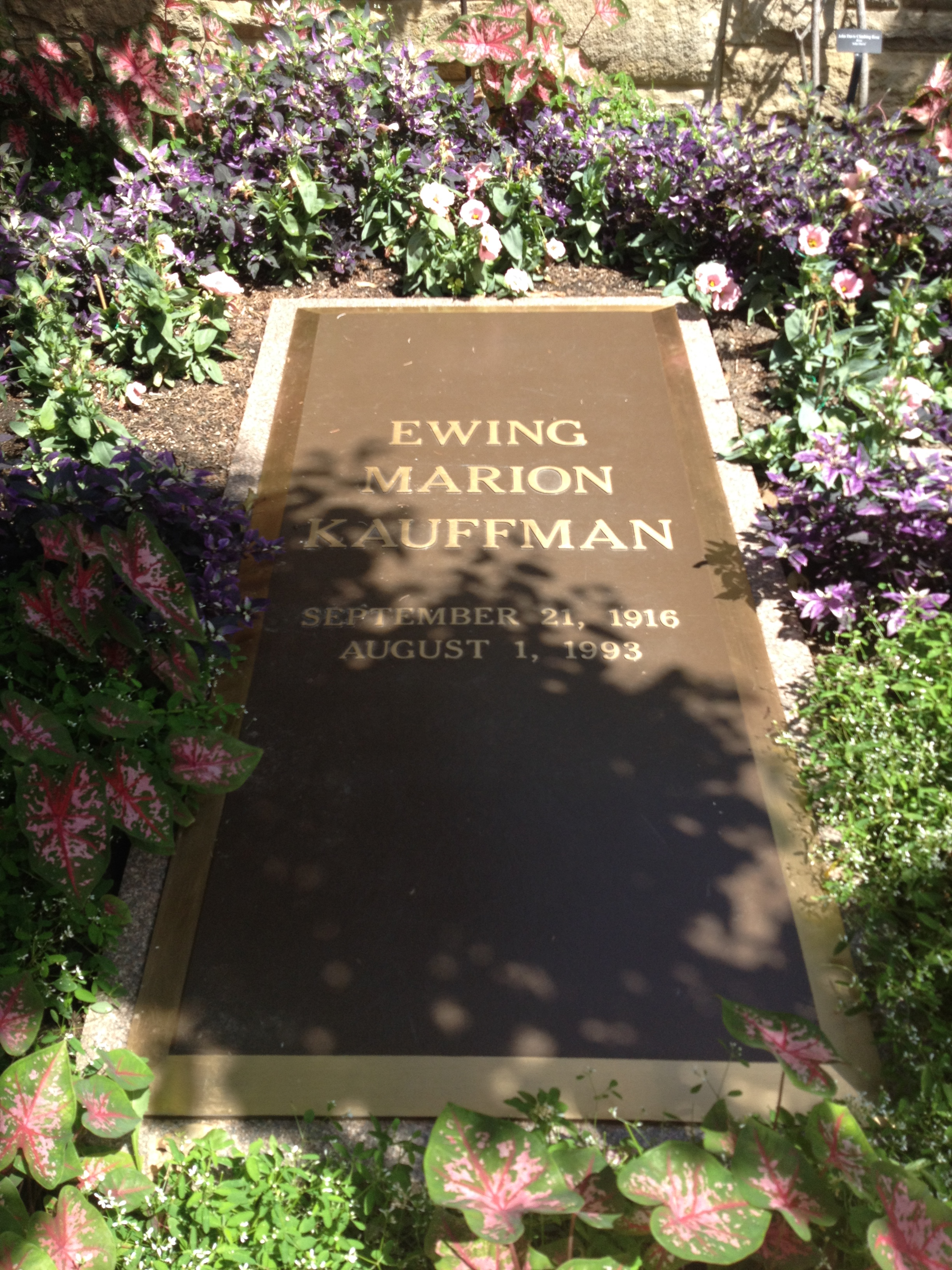
Ewing Kauffman burial site

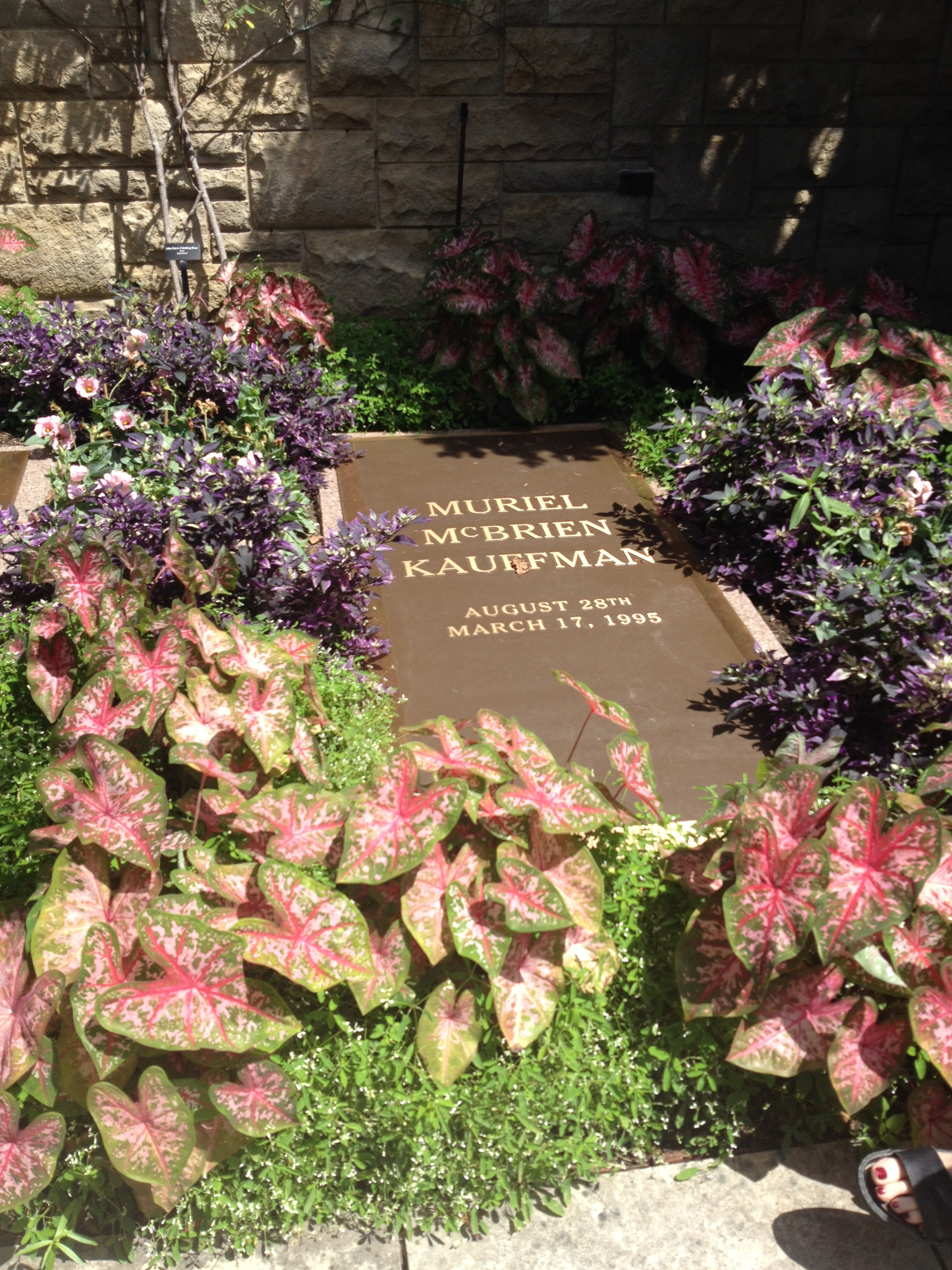
Muriel Kauffman burial site

== See also ==
- List of botanical gardens and arboretums in Missouri
