= Peace Park (Missouri) =

Park and arboretum in Columbia, Missouri

Coordinates: 38.9482°N 92.3298°W

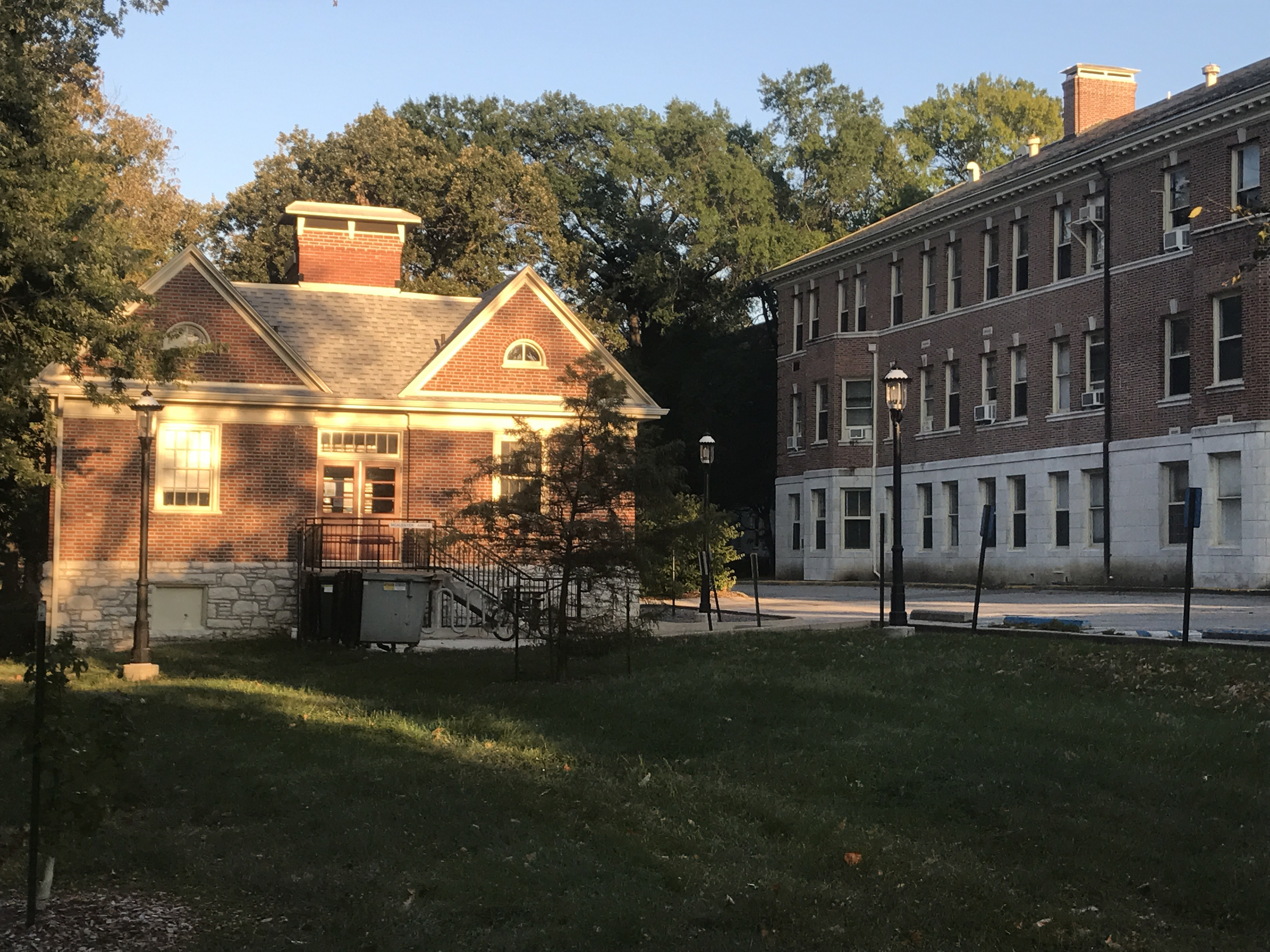
The “Monkey House” in McAlester Park

Peace Park also known as McAlester Arboretum is a park and arboretum located on the University of Missouri campus in Columbia, Missouri, United States. It was renamed Peace Park after the Kent State Massacre, to which there is a memorial in the park. The park is near Francis Quadrangle and the Missouri School of Journalism. Across Elm Street is Downtown Columbia and the Columbia Missourian and the State Historical Society of Missouri. Peace Park is popular with students, faculty, and Columbia residents alike.

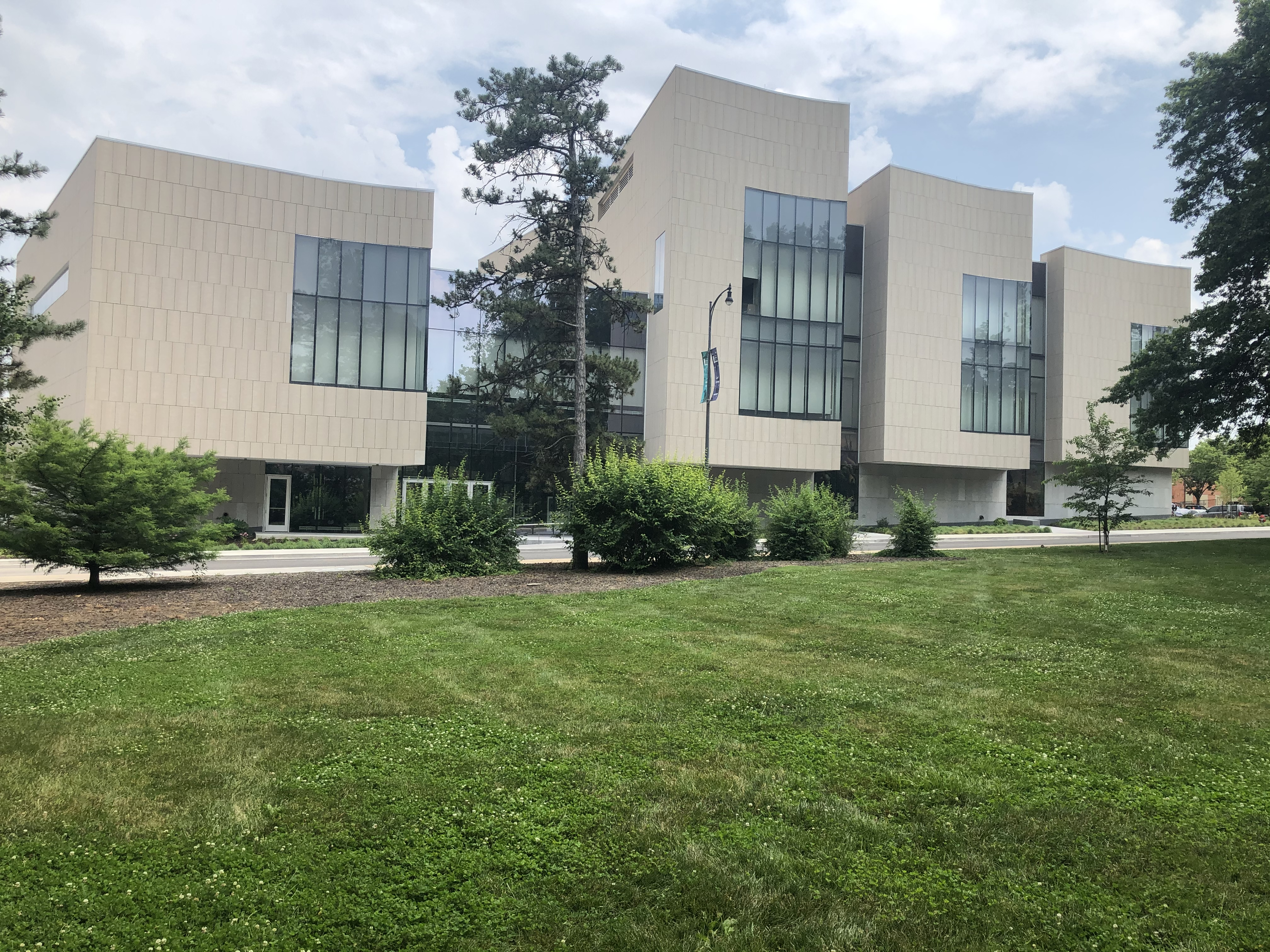
The State Historical Society of Missouri from McAlester Park

== History ==
McAlester Park is the oldest undeveloped land on Mizzou's main campus. It was named after McAlester Hall, home to the medical school, in the early 1900s.

In 1967, the park was the gathering place for a peaceful anti-war rally. Again, in 1969 on Moratorium Day people gathered in the park to peacefully protest. On May 4, 1971, one year after the Kent State Massacre, students gathered again in the park to peacefully march. The march ended back in the park, where they officially changed the name from McAlester Park to Peace Park. The night ended in an all-night concert. By the end of the night, students had created a peace symbol of rocks within the park as a memorial to the Kent State Massacre victims

== Features ==
The McAlester arboretum contains more than 100 trees of 43 varieties. Plans include adding several genera of trees and shrubs important to the Mid-Missouri region. Goose Creek runs through the park and eventually into Flat Branch of Hinkson Creek and ultimately to Perche Creek and the Missouri River. The campus has been designated the Mizzou Botanic Garden.

== See also ==
- List of botanical gardens and arboretums in Missouri
