= Sistema Peralta =

Baseball strategy

Sistema Peralta (Peralta system) is a baseball strategy where the pitching rotation in a 9-inning game is divided amongst three pitchers throwing three innings each (3-3-3), or one pitcher every three innings. This system contrasts with the more traditional strategy of having a starting pitcher, who handles the bulk of the pitching workload (typically at least 5 innings), and reliever(s) who finish up the game (i.e. 5-2-2, 5-2-1-1, among various other combinations). It is named after Tigres del Mexico founder Alejo Peralta, who established and implemented its use with Tigres starting in the 1970s.

== Background ==
The strategy is an adaptation from early research theories proposed by mechanical engineering professor at Princeton University and baseball statistician Earnshaw Cook. For games not enforcing the designated hitter rule, Cook realized that he could start the game with a series of relievers and use a designated batter when the pitcher would normally bat. After doing so, in the following half inning where his team had to pitch, he would place the next reliever. This is done until the end of four whole innings, where he would put in the starting pitcher and proceed as normal until the end of the game.

== Prominent uses ==
=== 2010 National League Championship Series (Game 6) ===
Mexican baseball analyst Tomas Morales pointed out that San Francisco Giants manager Bruce Bochy had used, albeit unaware, a similar version of the system in Game 6 of the 2010 National League Championship Series.
