= Cedric Tallis =

American sports executive (1914–1991)

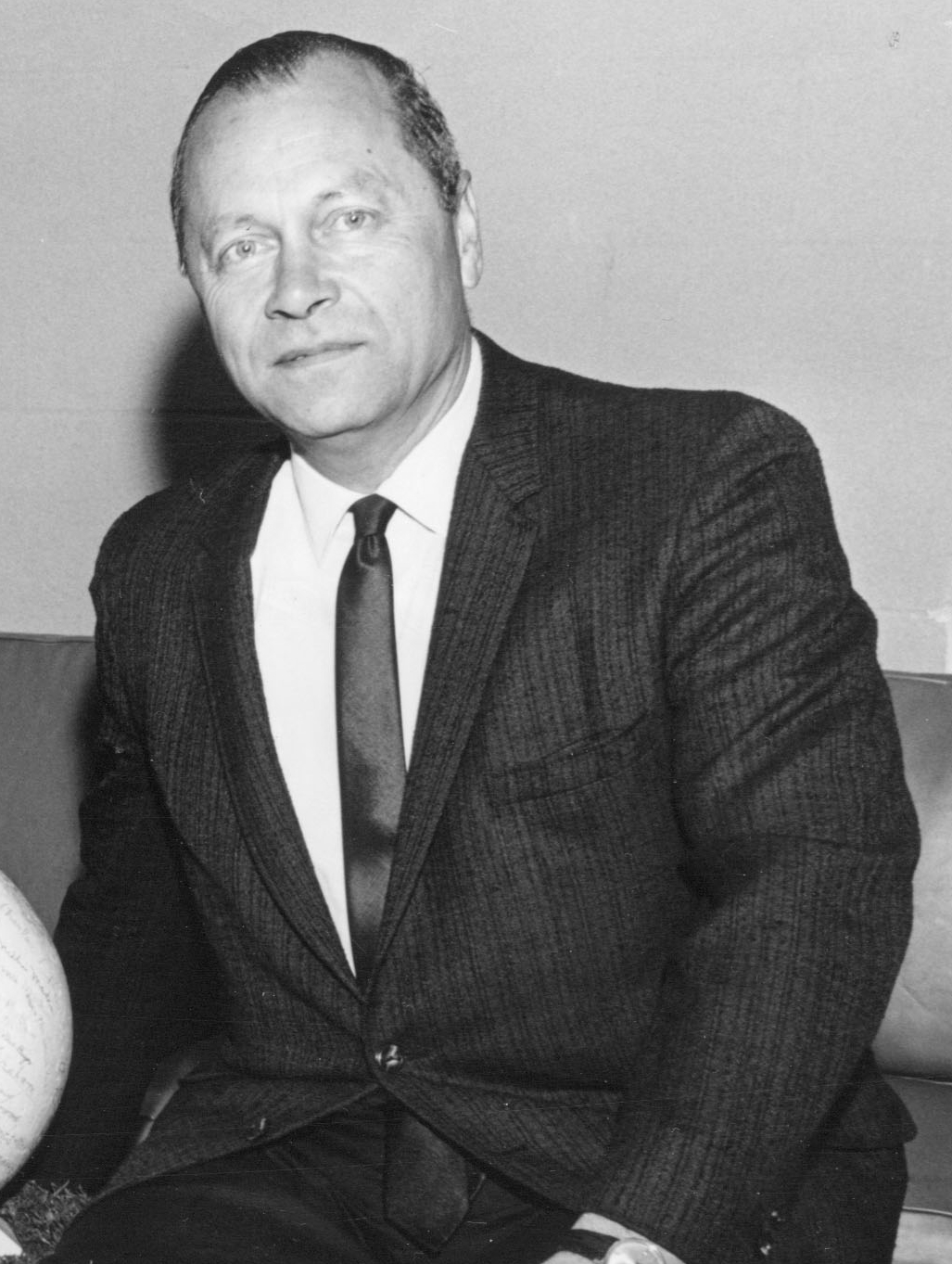
- Tallis in 1968
- General manager / Executive
- Born: July 29, 1914; New York City, U.S.
- Died: May 8, 1991 (aged 76); Tampa, Florida, U.S.

Teams
- As general manager: Kansas City Royals (1968–1974); New York Yankees (1978–1979)

Career highlights and awards
- World Series champion (1978); Kansas City Royals Hall of Fame

Cedric Nelson Tallis (July 29, 1914 – May 8, 1991) was an American executive in Major League Baseball who served as the first general manager of the expansion Kansas City Royals and later played an important role in the New York Yankees' dynasty of the late 1970s.

== Career ==
A World War II veteran of the United States Army, where he attained the rank of major, Tallis was the general manager of teams in minor league baseball, including the Birmingham Barons of the Double-A Southern Association and the Vancouver Mounties and Seattle Rainiers of the Triple-A Pacific Coast League, through the end of the 1960 season. His first major league job was as business manager of one of the American League's first two expansion teams, the Los Angeles Angels, whom he joined in their maiden season, 1961.

Seven years later, in 1968, Tallis was hired by Royals' owner Ewing Kauffman to build his expansion team when it entered the AL in 1969. Tallis recruited a management team that included future GMs John Schuerholz, Lou Gorman, Syd Thrift, Jack McKeon and Herk Robinson. Gorman, in his autobiography, described Tallis as "enthusiastic, energetic, extremely personable and eager for the challenge to prove he could run a major league ball club." He drafted wisely in the 1968 AL Expansion Draft, supervised the founding and operation of the Kansas City Royals Baseball Academy, a revolutionary training ground for elite athletes without significant baseball experience, and built a strong farm system. By 1971, their third season, the Royals sported a winning record—earning Tallis the Executive of the Year Award from The Sporting News that season. Two years later, the Royals moved into a state-of-the-art new ballpark, Royals Stadium, now Kauffman Stadium.

But in June 1974, Tallis was replaced as Kansas City's GM by Joe Burke, former general manager of the Texas Rangers. Under Burke, players signed and developed during Tallis' tenure—such as Baseball Hall of Famer George Brett—would mature to help Kansas City dominate the American League West Division during the latter part of the 1970s. Tallis, however, soon joined the front office of the Yankees, reporting to George Steinbrenner and Yankee president/GM Gabe Paul. Tallis' first task in the Bronx was to serve as the club's supervisor of the successful 1974–75 renovation of Yankee Stadium. After the 1977 season, and the Yankees' first world championship in 15 years, Paul resigned to become president of the Cleveland Indians. In the front office overhaul that followed, Tallis was named Yankee general manager.

Tallis held the title during the 1978 and 1979 seasons, although owner Steinbrenner took an integral role in the team's day-to-day operations and at one point named manager Bob Lemon as the team's GM-designate during the middle of the 1978 season. During Tallis' administration, the Yankees continued their aggressive role in baseball free agency (notably signing Hall of Fame relief pitcher Goose Gossage). In his first season, New York roared back from a 14 1/2-game midseason deficit to beat the Boston Red Sox in a one-game playoff for the 1978 AL East flag, defeat Tallis' old Royals club for the third consecutive season in the ALCS, then take the 1978 World Series in six games from the Los Angeles Dodgers. The following year, however, the Yankees suffered the tragic loss of catcher and team captain Thurman Munson in an August plane crash and finished fourth, 13 1/2 games in arrears of the Baltimore Orioles. Tallis was replaced as general manager by Gene Michael at the end of the season.

He spent three more years in the Yankee front office as an executive vice president before leaving the organization in 1982. He then became executive director of the Tampa Bay Baseball Group, which was established to lure a Major League club to the Tampa Bay area. Although the group nearly convinced the Chicago White Sox to move to the Florida enclave, it did not succeed in its mission during Tallis' lifetime. He died of a heart attack in Tampa at the age of 76 in 1991. All told, Tallis had a 43-year career in baseball management.

Preceded by Franchise created	Kansas City Royals General Manager; 1968–1974	Succeeded by Joe Burke
Preceded by Gabe Paul	New York Yankees General Manager; 1977–1979	Succeeded by Gene Michael
