= John McDonough (sports executive) =

American sports executive (born 1953)

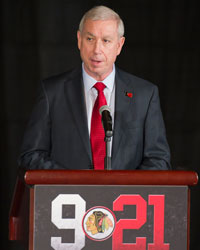
- McDonough in 2011
- Born: John McDonough; May 19, 1953 (age 73); Chicago, Illinois, U.S.
- Education: Saint Mary's University of Minnesota
- Occupations: Former President & CEO of the Chicago Blackhawks
- Years active: 1974–2020

John McDonough (born May 19, 1953) is an American sports executive who spent two decades with the Chicago Cubs. In 2007, he left the presidency of the Cubs to become president of the Chicago Blackhawks. On June 1, 2011, McDonough was promoted to president and CEO of the Blackhawks. He specialized in the area of marketing. On April 27, 2020, he was released from his job with the Blackhawks.

== Personal life ==
McDonough is a lifelong Chicago area resident, graduating from Notre Dame High School in Niles, Illinois before matriculating to Saint Mary's University in Winona, Minnesota.

== Professional career ==
=== Chicago Sting ===
McDonough's first work as a sports executive was with the Chicago Sting, Chicago's franchise in the North American Soccer League (NASL). He served as General Sales Manager, and later as Vice President of Sales and Marketing. McDonough was also a member of the front office when the Sting won the 1981 NASL Soccer Bowl Championship.

=== Chicago Cubs ===
McDonough spent 25 years with the Cubs (1983–2007). During his tenure with the team, the Cubs set numerous attendance records, setting an all-time mark in 2007, when McDonough was team president. In McDonough's time as Cubs president, the franchise saw success off the field, but not on the field, as the team only made the playoffs 5 times, winning one postseason series, and finishing 125 games under .500.

One of the major innovations McDonough is credited with is the annual "Cubs Convention" which gives fans a chance to meet and interact with coaches, players and licensed vendors. Debuting in 1985, this was the first event of its kind in sports and is now viewed as a prototype for professional team and league fan festivals.

He also is credited with creating the role of "guest conductor", where celebrities, local heroes, and local high school sports champions are given the chance to lead the singing of "Take Me Out to the Ball Game" during the seventh-inning stretch at Cubs home games. The promotion started in the wake of the death of broadcaster Harry Caray in 1998, and continues as a tradition today.

=== Chicago Blackhawks ===
On November 20, 2007, McDonough left the Cubs and became president of the Chicago Blackhawks, Chicago's National Hockey League franchise. The Hawks future stars had already been drafted. In 2006, Jonathan Toews was the #3 pick and in June 2007 Patrick Kane was selected #1. In his tenure with the team, the Blackhawks have moved quickly to revitalize the team's profile and fan base, in what Forbes Magazine called "The Greatest Sports-Business Turnaround Ever." Since McDonough joined the Blackhawks, the team has won Stanley Cup titles in 2010, 2013 and 2015, becoming the first organization in the NHL's salary cap era to capture three championships.

Upon his arrival to the Blackhawks, McDonough welcomed back Hall of Famers Bobby Hull, Stan Mikita and Tony Esposito as team ambassadors, and helped foster a landmark partnership with WGN Television and Comcast SportsNet which allowed all 82 regular-season games to be broadcast on television for the first time in team history. The Blackhawks also announced a partnership with Chicago's WGN Radio 720 to become the team's new radio broadcast rightsholder.

McDonough was also instrumental in bringing the NHL Winter Classic 2009 to Chicago, a contest which matched up the Blackhawks and Detroit Red Wings in front of 40,818 at Wrigley Field on January 1, 2009. The game drew an 11.8 overnight rating and a 21 share on NBC in Chicago, making it the most-watched NHL game in almost 34 years.

The Blackhawks franchise has undergone an enormous transformation under McDonough's leadership; since 2007, the team's season ticketholder base has more than tripled, and the Blackhawks have sold out 340 straight home contests and counting, leading the league in average attendance each season since 2008-09. In less than two years since McDonough's arrival, the Blackhawks organization jumped from 118th (2007) to 16th (2010) in ESPN Magazine's Ultimate Standings. The organization's ranking marked the best among Chicago's professional sports teams. In 2012, a survey of SportsBusiness Journal readers voted the Blackhawks the NHL team for which they'd most like to work. In the 2015 SportsBusiness Journal survey, the Blackhawks were the highest-ranked NHL team in the category "Team that represents the ‘model franchise’ in all of North American sports." On November 11, 2018, he fired coach Joel Quenneville after a 6–6–3 start. Quenneville ended his 10+ seasons with the Blackhawks with a 452–249–96 regular-season record, a 76–52 record in the postseason, and as the second winningest coach in NHL history with 890 wins.

On April 27, 2020, McDonough was released from his role with the Blackhawks.

In October 2021, an independent investigation into how the Blackhawks responded to claims that video coach Brad Aldrich had sexually assaulted a player revealed that just days before the 2010 Stanley Cup Finals, McDonough convened a meeting with several other team officials at which it was decided that any further action would be deferred until after the Finals. Aldrich was allowed to quietly resign after the Finals, and subsequently pleaded guilty to assaulting a high school hockey player in Michigan. The investigation found that McDonough took responsibility for handling the matter, but did not inform human resources until three weeks after the Finals. In response, NHL Commissioner Gary Bettman decreed that McDonough and others who took part in the meeting would have to meet with him before they could be allowed to work in the NHL again.

== Other work ==
- Juvenile Diabetes Research Foundation International: Advisory Board of Directors (Illinois Chapter)
- Northwestern University: Master of Arts in Sports Administration Faculty Advisory Board

== Awards ==
- Major League Baseball Marketing Excellence Award
- Chicago Baseball Veteran's Committee Man of the Year
- Promo Magazine: America's Top Ten Marketing Executives
- St. Mary's University of Minnesota Presidential Award For Outstanding Merit (2010)
- Notre Dame High School Hall of Fame
- Public Relations Society of America (Chicago Chapter): Executive of the Year
- Chicagoland Sports Hall of Fame: Inducted in 2008

Preceded by Andy MacPhail	Chicago Cubs President; 2006–2007	Succeeded by Crane Kenney (as Chairman)
