= List of botanical gardens and arboretums in Missouri =

This list of botanical gardens and arboretums in Missouri is intended to include all significant botanical gardens and arboretums in the U.S. state of Missouri

Name	Image	Affiliation	City
Ewing and Muriel Kauffman Memorial Garden		Ewing Marion Kauffman Foundation	Kansas City
McAlester Arboretum		University of Missouri	Columbia
Missouri Botanical Garden			St. Louis
Missouri State Arboretum		Northwest Missouri State University	Maryville
Mizzou Botanic Garden		University of Missouri	Columbia
Powell Gardens			Kingsville
Seiwa-en		Missouri Botanical Garden	St. Louis
Shaw Nature Reserve		Missouri Botanical Garden	Gray Summit

== See also ==
- List of botanical gardens and arboretums in the United States
