= Larry Himes =

American baseball general manager

- General manager
- Born: October 7, 1940 (age 85); Riverside, California, U.S.
- Stats at Baseball Reference

Teams
- Chicago White Sox (1986–1990); Chicago Cubs (1991–1994)

Career highlights and awards
- Acquired Sammy Sosa for both the White Sox and Cubs

Lawrence Austin Himes (born October 7, 1940, in Riverside, California) is an American former general manager (GM) for two Major League Baseball (MLB) teams: the Chicago White Sox (1986–1990); and the Chicago Cubs (1991–1994). Himes is likely best known for trading for Sammy Sosa during each tenure as GM. Prior to becoming a general manager, he was the California Angels scouting director (1981–1986). During his nine-year playing career (1961–1969), Himes was a catcher in eight minor league baseball farm systems, batting .251 in 725 games played.

== Tenure with White Sox ==
Himes was hired by White Sox chairman Jerry Reinsdorf to succeed Ken "Hawk" Harrelson in 1986. Harrelson, a longtime broadcaster for the White Sox, had a tenure of just under a season, and Himes was charged with rebuilding the franchise.

Himes as a rookie general manager generated controversy among players. Himes established and enforced rules requiring socks be worn into the clubhouse, and banning the bringing of beer into the Sox clubhouse.

Outside the clubhouse, Himes built the White Sox farm system, drafting All-Stars Jack McDowell, Robin Ventura, Frank Thomas, and Alex Fernandez in the first round in consecutive years (1987–1990). By late 1990, all four were integral parts of the White Sox.

Himes also traded one of the Sox franchise's most popular players, Harold Baines, in July 1989. With the White Sox so far out of the pennant race, Baines and second baseman Fred Manrique were sent to the Texas Rangers for second baseman Scott Fletcher, pitcher Wilson Álvarez, and 20-year-old outfielder Sammy Sosa. Baines' bat wasn't enough to lift the Rangers to an American League West title, and Fletcher and Sosa found starting jobs with the White Sox in 1990. Álvarez made his Major League debut in 1991, no-hitting the Baltimore Orioles in his first start. He later became a key member of the White Sox staff. Sosa blossomed into a star several years later, causing then-Rangers managing partner George W. Bush to muse that his approval of the trade was one of the worst mistakes he ever made.

Thanks in part to Himes' moves, field manager Jeff Torborg's performance, and strong seasons from veterans like Iván Calderón, Ozzie Guillén, Carlton Fisk, and Bobby Thigpen, the White Sox won 94 games in 1990, contending with the eventual American League champion Oakland Athletics into the final week of the season. The season was the last in old Comiskey Park, as the White Sox were scheduled to move into a new ballpark with the same name across the street (now named Guaranteed Rate Field). Himes was not there to see the White Sox make the move, as he and his director of scouting Al Goldis were fired after the 1990 season.

== Tenure with Cubs ==
Cubs chairman Don Grenesko hired Himes to succeed Jim Frey as general manager on the same October 1991 day that he fired Frey. The Cubs had come off of a season where three expensive free-agent acquisitions (George Bell, Danny Jackson, and Dave Smith) failed to lift the Cubs over .500.

Himes immediately hired his field manager, former Oakland Athletics coach Jim Lefebvre.

=== Trading for Sammy Sosa, again ===
Himes' biggest move with the Cubs came just before the end of Spring Training 1992, when Himes sent Bell to the White Sox for Sosa and left-handed pitcher Ken Patterson. While this trade has been mentioned as one of the Cubs' best in franchise history, it did not look so lopsided when it was made. Sosa had struggled in 1991, spending some time with the White Sox' Triple-A affiliate. White Sox brass questioned if Sosa would ever harness his raw talent. Meanwhile, Bell was a former American League MVP and was a National League All-Star in 1991.

After battling injuries in 1992, Sosa quieted criticism of the trade by hitting 30 home runs and stealing 30 bases in 1993 and 1994. Meanwhile, Bell was out of baseball by 1994.

=== Contract negotiations with Greg Maddux ===
While Himes' tenure with the Cubs will most likely be fondly remembered for the acquisition of Sosa, it will also be remembered conversely for the departure of pitcher Greg Maddux following the 1992 season, a season in which Maddux won 20 games and his first of four consecutive National League Cy Young Awards.

Maddux had emerged back in 1988, when he made the National League All-Star team for the first time and won 18 games. He won 19 games in 1989 and 15 in 1990 and 1991, staking his claim as the Cubs' ace, and one of the National League's best pitchers. As he was eligible for free agency in 1992, Himes negotiated with Maddux and his agent Scott Boras during the first half of 1992. In July 1992, Himes offered Maddux a contract that would pay him more than $5 million per year. Maddux indicated that he wanted to test the free agent market first, so the offer was withdrawn.

After Maddux filed for free agency, he fielded offers from the New York Yankees and the Atlanta Braves. After he received his offer from the Braves, he contacted Himes to see if Himes would match the offer. Himes declined, stating that he spent Maddux's money on Randy Myers, José Guzmán, Dan Plesac, and Candy Maldonado.

Maddux made his Braves' debut on Opening Day 1993 at Wrigley Field, beating the Cubs and his former teammate Mike Morgan 1–0. He went on to play in every postseason from 1993 until 2003, winning three more Cy Young Awards, three National League pennants and one World Series. Guzmán's Cubs career was marred by injuries and Maldonado and Plesac did not make significant contributions to the club either. Myers became the Cubs' relief ace, and he helped the Cubs finish .500 in 1993.

Maddux's departure is regarded as one of the Cubs' franchise's worst moves, on par with the trading of future Baseball Hall of Fame inductee Lou Brock to the St. Louis Cardinals for pitcher Ernie Broglio.

=== Other stars depart ===
Himes also presided over the exodus of other popular stars on the club. Rick Sutcliffe departed after the 1992 season and managed productive seasons with the Baltimore Orioles. Right fielder Andre Dawson was not offered a contract after 1992 and signed on with the Boston Red Sox, playing four more seasons.

Catcher Joe Girardi was left unprotected during the 1992 expansion draft, allowing the Colorado Rockies to select him. Girardi later helped the New York Yankees win the 1996, 1998, and 1999 World Series.

=== Disastrous 1994 season ===
Himes' era reached a nadir during 1994. The Cubs started the year losing their first 10 home games, causing new manager Tom Trebelhorn to conduct a "Town Hall" meeting on a park bench in front of the fire station on Waveland Avenue. The Cubs floundered throughout the season before a strike mercifully ended it in August 1994.

=== Sandberg walks away ===
The low point of the 1994 season came in June, when perennial All-Star second baseman Ryne Sandberg, now a member of the Hall of Fame, abruptly announced his retirement. Sandberg had slumped the first two months of 1994, and days after announcing his retirement, his wife filed for divorce. Still, Sandberg cited Himes' draconian clubhouse rules and management style as one of the reasons for his departure in his autobiography 'Second to Home,' co-authored by Barry Rozner.

Sandberg came out of retirement to play in 1996 and 1997. By then, Ed Lynch was general manager and Andy MacPhail team president.

== See also ==
Preceded by Ken Harrelson	Chicago White Sox General Manager; 1986–1990	Succeeded by Ron Schueler
Preceded by Jim Frey	Chicago Cubs General Manager; 1991–1994	Succeeded by Ed Lynch
