= Joe Burke (baseball executive) =

American baseball executive (1923–1992)

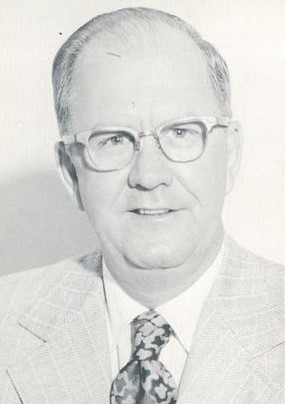
- General manager / Executive
- Born: December 8, 1923; Louisville, Kentucky, U.S.
- Died: May 12, 1992 (aged 68); Kansas City, Kansas, U.S.

Teams
- As general manager: Texas Rangers (1972–1973); Kansas City Royals (1974–1981); As president: Kansas City Royals (1981–1992)

Career highlights and awards
- World Series champion (1985); Sporting News Executive of the Year (1976); Kansas City Royals Hall of Fame

Joseph Roy Burke (December 8, 1923 – May 12, 1992) was an American front office executive in Major League Baseball who served as general manager or club president of the Kansas City Royals for almost 18 years during the most successful period in that expansion team's early history.

Burke was executive vice president and general manager of the Royals from the middle of the 1974 season through October 1981. He then served as club president until his death on May 12, 1992. During his tenure, Burke was general manager of the Royals' first American League championship team, the 1980 edition, then was president of the 1985 Royals, who won the franchise's first World Series title. In addition to those two pennant-winners, the Royals won American League West Division championships in 1976, 1977, 1978, 1981 (second half of a split season) and 1984. In 1976, he was named Major League Executive of the Year by The Sporting News after his first division title.

Before coming to Kansas City, Burke had been a member of the front office of the Texas Rangers and its predecessor, the second modern-era Washington Senators franchise. He had begun his baseball career in 1948 with the Louisville Colonels of the Triple-A American Association, where he worked under general manager Ed Doherty. After rising to the post of GM of the Colonels in 1960, Burke joined the expansion Senators in their debut 1961 season as business manager, again working for Doherty, the team's first general manager. He later was named the Senators' vice president and treasurer, and was retained when Bob Short purchased the Senators in 1968. He accompanied the franchise to Dallas-Fort Worth when it relocated after the 1971 season and became the Rangers' general manager in their first season in North Texas. After two years in that role, Burke moved to the Royals as business manager after the 1973 campaign.

In June 1974, Burke became the second general manager in the Royals' six-year history. One of his first major moves was the hiring of Whitey Herzog as manager during the middle of the 1975 season on July 25. Herzog would be elected to the Baseball Hall of Fame as a manager in 2010, but he had failed dismally as the Rangers' pilot, working under Burke, during 1973. In Kansas City, he would turn the Royals into consistent contenders in the AL West. Burke also appointed Jim Frey and Dick Howser as managers after Herzog's exit, and each man would lead Kansas City to an American League pennant (and, in Howser's case, the 1985 World Series title as well).

In August 1981, he was diagnosed with lymphoma and began chemotherapy treatments. As such, he was promoted to team president in October to lighten his workload while his assistant John Schuerholz was promoted to general manager. Like Herzog, Schuerholz would also be elected to the Baseball Hall of Fame (in 2017, for his later success as GM of the Atlanta Braves).

In 1992, Burke's lymphatic cancer returned. On May 12, he died in Kansas City, Kansas at the age of 68.

Preceded by Bob Short	Texas Rangers General Manager; 1972–1973	Succeeded by Dan O'Brien Sr.
Preceded by Cedric Tallis	Kansas City Royals General Manager; 1974–1981	Succeeded by John Schuerholz
Preceded by Ewing Kauffman	Kansas City Royals President; 1981–1992	Succeeded by Michael E. Herman
