= Muriel Kauffman =

Canadian civic leader and philanthropist

Muriel Irene McBrien Kauffman
- Born: August 28, 1916; Toronto, Ontario, Canada
- Died: March 17, 1995 (aged 78)
- Resting place: Ewing and Muriel Kauffman Memorial Garden
- Education: Trafalgar Castle School; McMaster University
- Occupations: Civic leader, philanthropist
- Known for: Founding owner of the Kansas City Royals, co-founder of the Kauffman Foundation, visionary behind the Kauffman Center for the Performing Arts
- Spouse: Ewing Kauffman (m. 1962)

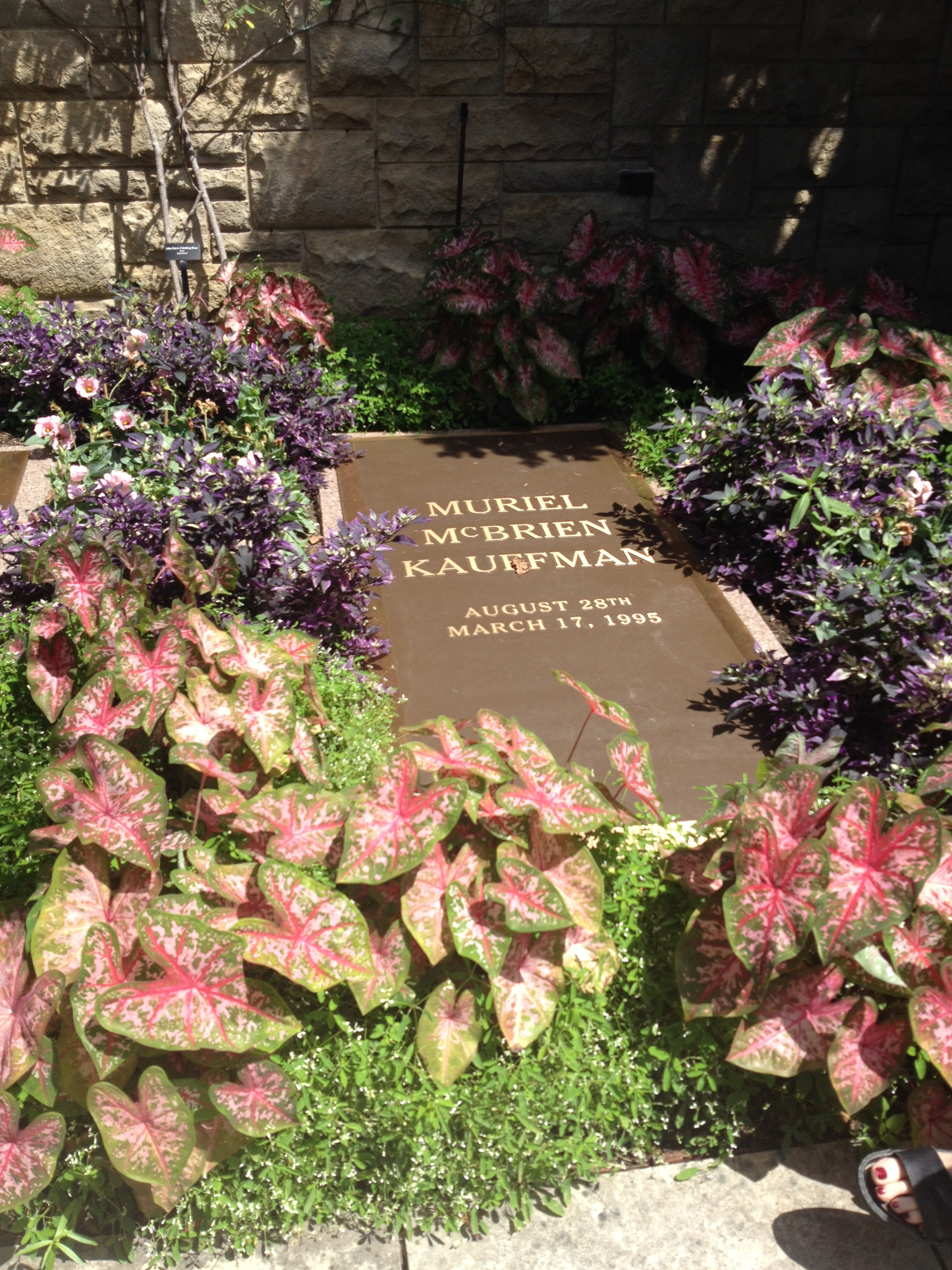
Muriel Kauffman burial site, Ewing and Muriel Kauffman Memorial Garden

Muriel Irene McBrien Kauffman (August 28, 1916 – March 17, 1995) was a Canadian civic leader and philanthropist in Kansas City, Missouri. She was the wife and partner of Ewing Kauffman. Ewing and Muriel worked together at Marion Labs and were the founding owners of the Kansas City Royals baseball team.

She was born in Toronto, Ontario, graduated from the Trafalgar Castle School in Whitby, Ontario and McMaster University in Hamilton, Ontario. Her father was Toronto lawyer and politician Fred McBrien. She met Ewing in the early 1960s in Miami, Florida. He was attending a medical convention and she was vacationing at the same hotel. They married in February 1962.

After her death, her remains were interred at the Ewing and Muriel Kauffman Memorial Garden next to her husband's remains.

in 1987, the Foundations for Ewing and Muriel split due to their diverse interests; Muriel focused her philanthropic effort on performing and visual arts, as well as causes related to healthcare, whereas Ewing's favorite charities revolved around education and entrepreneurial support. Muriel's legacy is further cemented with her receipt of the Mr. Baseball Award from the Baseball Writer Association of America, the William Booth Award from the Salvation Army, and, with her husband, the 1986 Mankind Award from the Heart of America Chapter of the Cystic Fibrosis Foundation. Muriel was named a director of UMB in 1971, and she was granted an honorary doctor of law degree from McMaster University (her undergraduate alma mater) in 1985.

== Kauffman Center for the Performing Arts ==
In 1994, Muriel dedicated much of her foundation's effort to realizing the construction of the Kauffman Center for the Performing Arts. Upon Muriel Kauffman's death, Julia Irene Kauffman (Muriel's daughter) carried forward her mother's idea to build a performing arts center in Kansas City. As chairman of the Muriel McBrien Kauffman Foundation, Julia Kauffman worked to turn her mother's dream into a performing arts center.

In the Crossroads District of Kansas City, Missouri, the Kauffman Center for the Performing Arts was opened in the fall of 2011.

The center includes a 1,600-seat concert hall and a 1,800-seat proscenium theater, and is the performance home for the Kansas City Symphony, the Lyric Opera of Kansas City, and the Kansas City Ballet. The Kauffman Center also features a diverse range of performances in both halls including dance and music of all types from pop to rock, light classical to country, jazz groups to bands, and gospel to folk music, as well as smaller Broadway and off-Broadway touring productions.
