= Marjorie Powell Allen =

American philanthropist

Marjorie Powell Allen (1929–1992) was an American philanthropist from Kansas City, Missouri who worked with the Powell Foundation.

Allen gave two day camps and a residential camp for children, but most notably she donated 809 acres of Powell family land that became Powell Botanical Gardens.

In 1996 the Marjorie Powell Allen Chapel, a non-denominational chapel designed by architect E. Fay Jones, opened at Powell Botanical Gardens.

Allen also helped found the Women's Employment Network of Kansas City and Central Exchange. The Network helps women on public assistance find jobs. The Central Exchange is a professional organization for diverse women.

In April 1983, Allen received an earnest letter of request from Mr. Charles S. Douglas, who, at the time, was a relatively new member of the Astronomical Society of Kansas City. Mr. Douglas wrote in hopes of obtaining a grant for $20,000 in order to build a new observatory on land leased to the organization by the City of Louisburg, Kansas in Lewis-Young Park. Remembering that her father, George E. Powell, who had established the family's foundation, Allen incrementally granted the organization their initial request which she generously expanded to nearly $48,000 to ensure the observatory would be equipped with restrooms and a computerized system for the extraordinary telescope built by the society's members which houses a nearly 30-inch mirror. Powell Observatory was opened and dedicated May 11, 1985 in a ceremony dedicating the Powell family name to the observatory. Powell Observatoryremains operational and continues to be managed and operated by the Astronomical Society of Kansas City.

In 1988, Allen was voted Philanthropist of the Year by the Greater Kansas City Council on Philanthropy. She also received the "Friend to Youth" award from the American Humanics program at Rockhurst College in 1985.

When she died after battling a long illness, her memorial celebration was held on the grounds of Powell Botanical Gardens.
