= Michael E. Herman =

Michael E. Herman (born 1941 in New York City) was president of the Kansas City Royals professional baseball team from 1992 to 2000.

Herman received a Bachelor of Science degree in metallurgical engineering from Rensselaer Polytechnic Institute in 1962 and an MBA from the University of Chicago.

Herman was executive vice president and chief financial officer of Marion Laboratories from 1974 to 1990 working for Ewing Kauffman before Kauffman tapped him to become president of the club.

Preceded by Joe Burke (baseball)	Kansas City Royals President; 1992–2000	Succeeded by Dan Glass
