= Larry Doughty =

American baseball executive

Larry Doughty was the general manager of the Pittsburgh Pirates Major League Baseball team, from 1989 to 1991.

Doughty then became a scout for the Cincinnati Reds, becoming scouting supervisor and later Scouting Director for the Reds from 1983 to 1987. He joined the Pittsburgh Pirates as assistant general manager to Syd Thrift, along with Cincinnati associate Cam Bonifay as his head scout. Doughty replaced Thrift as general manager of the Pirates on November 7, 1988, due to conflict between Thrift and the ownership group. The Pirates won division titles in Doughty's third and fourth years, with new additions Don Slaught, Zane Smith and Jay Bell.

He was criticized, though, for the loss of top prospects like Wes Chamberlain (on a waiver error) and Moisés Alou (for Smith), hurting the farm system. In 1992, the club's new president, Mark Sauer, replaced Doughty with Ted Simmons.

Doughty was a special assistant to the GM for the San Diego Padres in 1993.

He was the farm director for the Kansas City Royals in 1996 and a VP for player personnel in 1998.

In 1999–2000, Doughty was a special assistant to the GM of the New York Mets.

Preceded by Syd Thrift	Pittsburgh Pirates General Manager; 1989 to 1991	Succeeded by Ted Simmons
