= Dan Glass =

American baseball executive

Dan Glass (born c. 1959) is the former president of the Kansas City Royals Major League Baseball team.

Glass is the son of former Royals owner David Glass who acquired the team in 2000 and immediately installed his son to succeed Mike E. Herman who had been president since 1992. The Glass family sold the Royals to John Sherman in 2019.

He attended Southwest Missouri State University and graduated from Drury University after working for five years at Wal-Mart where his father was CEO working in Fayetteville, Arkansas; Tahlequah, Oklahoma; Tulsa, Oklahoma; and Carbondale, Illinois. He lives in Olathe, Kansas, and operated a jewelry business and Glass Enterprises real estate business.

He began working in the Royals Baseball Operations Department in 1993 as a baseball operations assistant and became assistant director of player personnel in 1996.

Preceded by Michael E. Herman	Kansas City Royals President; 2000–2019	Succeeded by vacant
