= Kansas City Royals Baseball Academy =

Buck O'Neil Baseball Complex
- Interactive map of Buck O'Neil Baseball Complex
- Former names: Kansas City Royals Baseball Academy
- Address: 6620 Clark Road; Sarasota; United States
- Coordinates: 27°15′59″N 82°26′20″W
- Current use: land is used as a county park

Construction
- Opened: 1969

Tenants
- Kansas City Royals (1969–1974); Baltimore Orioles (1990–present)

The Kansas City Royals Baseball Academy (also known as the Royals Academy and the GCL Royals Academy) was a part of the player development system of the Kansas City Royals in the early 1970s. The Royals are an American professional baseball team based in Kansas City, Missouri. An innovation conceived by Ewing Kauffman, the franchise's original owner, the goal was to develop quality athletes into major-league-caliber ballplayers for the organization. Fourteen Academy students eventually graduated to the majors, the most notable of which were Ron Washington, U L Washington and Frank White. Others who made the majors included Bruce Miller and Rodney Scott. The concept was discontinued in May 1974.

== Facilities ==
Constructed at a cost of about US $1.5 million, the academy was located on 121 acres (49 ha) of land just southeast of Sarasota, Florida. The facilities consisted of two buildings and five baseball diamonds, each built to the exact specifications of the one at Royals Stadium which opened in April 1973. That meant all the fields had AstroTurf playing surfaces, sliding pits around the bases instead of a full dirt infield, uniform 12-foot (3.66 m) outfield walls and measurements of 330 ft (100.58 m) down the foul lines, 385 ft (117.35 m) in the power alleys, 410 ft (124.97 m) to straightaway center field and 60 ft (18.29 m) from home plate to the backstop. The academy was dedicated on March 21, 1971, with Kauffman, Commissioner of Baseball Bowie Kuhn and American and National League presidents Joe Cronin and Chub Feeney in attendance.

The facilities are part of Twin Lakes Park, which was purchased by Sarasota County in 1986. It was renamed the Buck O'Neil Baseball Complex on March 8, 1995. Various major league ballclubs have used it in the decades following the academy's closure. The latest is the Baltimore Orioles, beginning with the start of spring training in 1990, and continuing since 1991 as the site of its minor league camp.

== Faculty ==
All seven of the academy's instructors had playing experience in Major League Baseball. They were Bill Fischer, Joe Gordon, Tommy Henrich, Steve Korcheck, Jim Lemon, Johnny Neun and Chuck Stobbs. Gordon had been the major league Royals' manager in 1969, the franchise's inaugural season. Korcheck was the academy's coordinator of instruction. Among the other members of the faculty, two were from the sport of track and field – Wes Santee and onetime University of Kansas coach Bill Easton. Mickey Cobb, the academy's athletic trainer, served in a similar capacity with the parent club in Kansas City from 1977 through 1990.

== Operations ==
The project began on September 11, 1969 when Kauffman officially announced plans to start the academy. Syd Thrift, who was already employed in the Royals' scouting department, was appointed as its director. In February 1970, Thrift asked high school coaches from around the United States to recommend boys who were both fine athletes regardless of sport and interested in attending the academy. By June and July of that same year, 7,682 young athletes between the ages of 16 and 21 attended tryout camps which were arranged in 41 states. Of the 42 who were accepted for the first class, none were scouted by any of the major league ballclubs and eight had never played the sport at the high-school level.

Each of the athletes selected for the 10‐month course received a $5,000 scholarship and a monthly salary of $100 for the first three months, $150 for the next three and $200 for the last four. They also got transportation to Sarasota, dormitory accommodations, three diet‐planned meals a day, health and life insurance, emergency dental care and a round‐trip plane ticket home for the Christmas holiday, all at the team's expense. Attendance at the academy included an educational requirement in which each individual had to fulfill 12 credit hours at Manatee Junior College. The players took classes in the morning. Kauffman recommended that the courses taken involved business and public relations out of concern for the players' financial well-being in the future. Expenses for books and room and board was paid by the Royals.
