= Powell Gardens =

Botanical garden in Kingsville, Missouri, United States

Coordinates: 38.8714°N 94.0410°W

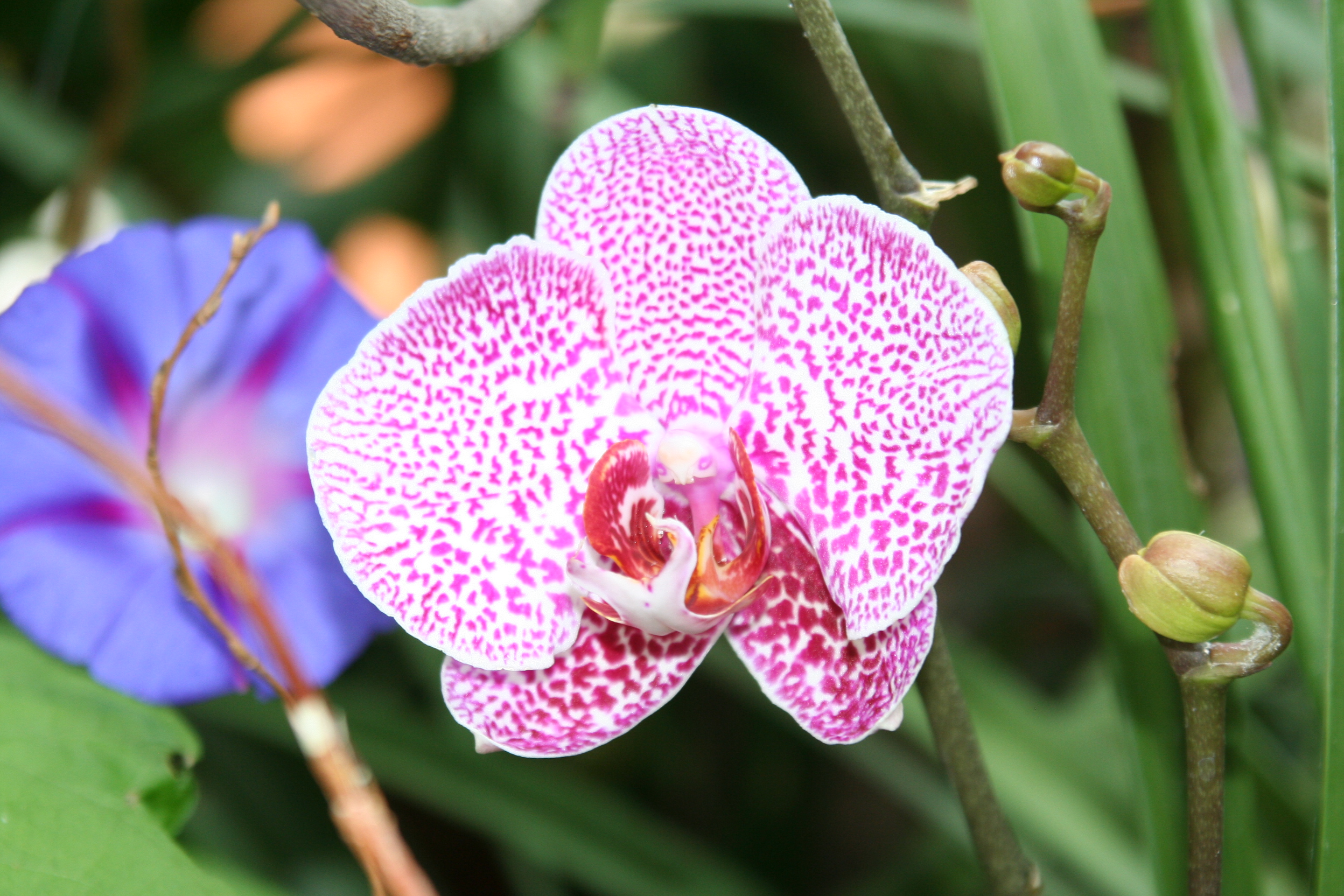
- Interactive map of Powell Gardens
- Website: Official website

Powell Gardens, Kansas City's botanical garden, is a 970-acre (3.9 km^{2}) botanical garden in Kingsville, Missouri, United States, 30 miles (48 km) east of Kansas City. It features 6,000 varieties of plants, with 225,000 plants in seasonal displays, and is open to the public, for a fee, during daylight hours.

The garden dates to 1948, when the land was purchased by George E. Powell, Sr. Since then, the site has been a dairy farm, a Boy Scout camp, an agricultural and natural resource center, and since 1988, a botanical garden.

== History ==
Powell Gardens' history begins in 1948, when George E. Powell, Sr., a prominent Kansas City businessman, acquired the land that is now Powell Gardens, Kansas City's botanical garden. Powell learned firsthand about the sometimes harsh and unpredictable life of farming during his childhood on the family farm. In 1917, he left to pursue a business career in Kansas City. He, along with his son George Powell Jr., and others, took over ownership of Yellow Transit Freight Lines, now YRC Freight, in 1952.

In 1969, in keeping with his stewardship philosophy, Mr. Powell donated the 640-acre (2.6 km^{2}) farm to the Kansas City Area Council of the Boy Scouts of America, who used it as a regional camp until 1984. In 1984, with the University of Missouri’s School of Agriculture as a catalyst and partner, the Powell Family Foundation began developing a horticultural and natural resource facility called Powell Center.

As a part of this development, Powell Center retained Pittsburgh, Pennsylvania-based Environmental Planning and Design, the leading U.S. consultants for botanical gardens. The firm recognized that the site would be ideal for development as a botanical garden. In 1988, official ties with the University of Missouri ended and Powell Gardens Inc., a not-for-profit organization, was established. A 19-member board of directors, in which several Powell family members serve, governs Powell Gardens. Friends of Powell Gardens, a separate organization, is made up of more than 5,000 members. Staffing at the gardens fluctuates between 35 employees during off-season and close to 70 in peak season. Powell Gardens is supported through private donations and admission, gift shop and rental revenues.

== Gardens ==
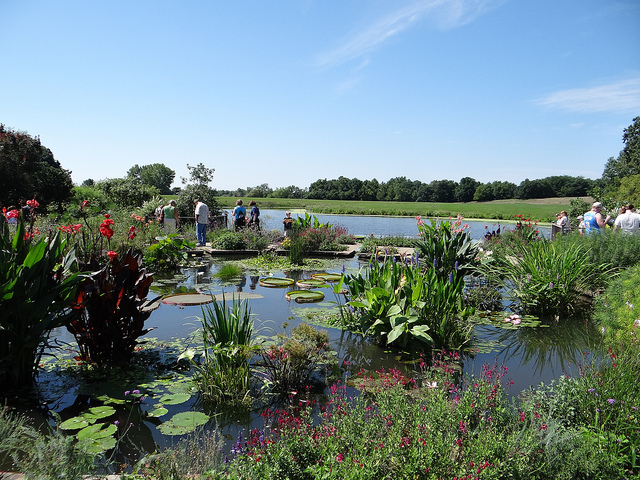
The Island Garden

- The Visitor Center and surrounding gardens - The Visitor Center is located at the heart of Powell Gardens’ 970 acres and is home to the Powell Gardens Conservatory which offers seasonal rotating installations and serves as the centerpiece for the surrounding gardens. Designed by architect E. Fay Jones, the Visitor Center offers a setting for educational classes, events, wedding receptions, the on-site restaurant Cafe Thyme and Perennial Gifts, the garden gift shop.
  - Surrounding gardens include: Visitor Center Landscape, Conservatory, Terrace Garden, Conifer Garden, The Dogwood Walk, and The Dennis & Anette Young Magnolia Walk.
- Fountain Garden - Centered between the Visitor Center, the Heartland Harvest Garden and the Conifer Garden, features a 42-foot diameter interactive water feature, surrounded by panicle hydrangeas, colorful annuals, burgundy ninebarks, and cannas.
- Marlese Lowe Gourley Island Garden– Tiered pools in this garden offer a diverse array of water plants in summer. Featured aquatic plants include waterlilies, lotus, cannas, and papyrus, which fill the pools with texture and movement.
- Pavilion and Meadow – native prairie grasses and flowers, burned each spring.
- Chapel walk and landscape – native oak-hickory woodland with native woodland wildflowers, including a collection of many varieties of redbud tree.
- David T. Beals III Woodland and Stream Garden – azaleas and rhododendrons, ferns, bleeding hearts, hostas, astilbes, giant butterburs and spring bulbs.
- Perennial Garden – more than 1,200 varieties, including daylilies, daffodils, hibiscus, and hardy asters and chrysanthemums, with ornamental grasses, against an evergreen background.
- Byron Shutz Nature Trail – 3 miles (4.8 km) of trail with native and naturalized trees, shrubs, grasses and wildflowers, including biscuitroot, draba, and prairie-plum.
- Heartland Harvest Garden – Powell Gardens is home to one of the largest edible landscapes in North America. This 12-acre (49,000 m^{2}) garden features many fruits and vegetables - some common, and some unfamiliar - and showcases "the journey of food from seed to plate". This garden features a French country style kitchen garden, greenhouses, a vineyard of native and European grapes, quilt gardens of local farm produce, and a youth education garden called the Fun Foods Farm. Also located in this garden is the open-air Missouri Barn, a beautiful structure that is home to concerts, barn dinners and cooking demos throughout the year.
- Memorial Garden - Located next to the Marjorie Powell Allen Chapel, the Memorial Garden’s path meanders through native wildflowers, lofty oaks, and a small native prairie. A trickling fountain attracts birds and butterflies to create a site that is vibrant and full of life.
- Perennial Garden - The Perennial Garden offers more than 1,200 varieties of plants that return year after year. This 3.5-acre landscape is designed as a series of “rooms” separated by trees and shrubs rather than walls.

== Attractions and events ==
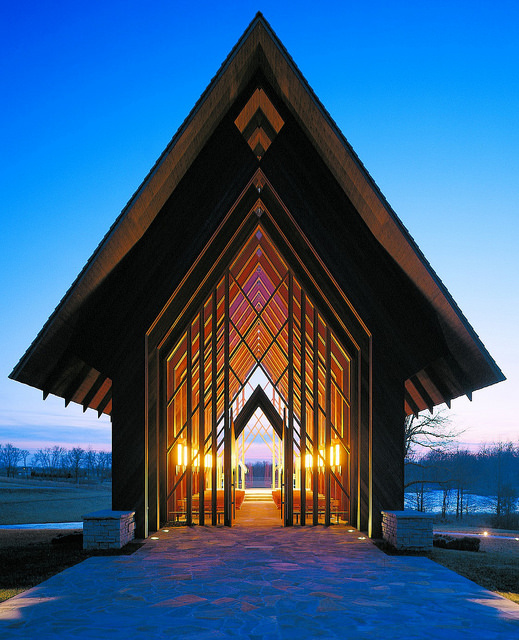
The Marjorie Powell Allen Chapel

The iconic Marjorie Powell Allen Chapel is a 4,700 sq. ft. nondenominational wedding chapel that first opened in 1996. It was designed by architect E. Fay Jones + Maurice Jennings and is made of mostly wood and glass.

Each year, the conservatory located in the Visitor Education Center is transformed into a tropical rainforest in order to house spring and summer butterfly exhibits. Blue morpho butterflies are featured along with others, including paper kite butterflies.

Powell Gardens hosts Missouri Barn Dinners every year, beginning in late spring. Held in the Missouri Barn, these dinners feature multi-course meals prepared by local chefs who are able to source many of their ingredients from the Heartland Harvest Garden. This series has featured chefs from notable Kansas City restaurants including República, Lidia's Kansas City, and others.

Powell Gardens hosts special exhibits each summer that are supplemented by a schedule of related special events and activities. Notable exhibits include:

- In 2001, Big Bugs! featured giant, lifelike bug sculptures, 100 times their normal size, scattered across the landscape. It included three ants that weighed 700 pounds each and were 25 feet long. The exhibit also featured a 1,200-pound female praying mantis, a 50-pound spider, and a 100-pound damselfly.
- In 2008, Chapungu - The Great African Sculpture Exhibit, featured 54 monumental stone sculptures. Visitors could watch master stone carvers at work in the gardens, and attend stone carving workshops hosted by the master carvers.

== See also ==
- List of botanical gardens and arboretums in Missouri
