= Mizzou Botanic Garden =

Botanical garden in Columbia, Missouri, United States

Coordinates: 38°56′43.08″N 92°19′43.68″W

- Interactive map of Mizzou Botanic Garden
- Website: Official website

The Mizzou Botanic Garden contains thousands of plants within the campus of the University of Missouri in Columbia, Missouri, United States. The Garden includes famous icons, such as Thomas Jefferson's original grave marker and the Columns of Academic Hall, and is open year-round, only asking for a small donation to visit.

== Collections ==
Notable collections include:

- Arboretum in McAlester Park 4 acres (1.6 ha), with more than 100 trees of 43 species.
- Asiatic & Oriental Lily Garden.
- Beetle Bailey Statue and Garden: Cartoon character Beetle Bailey and the surrounding gardens pay tribute to Mort Walker, creator of Beetle Bailey and MU distinguished alum.
- Bulb Display Garden.
- Butterfly Garden.
- Daylily Garden: Features more than 50 cultivars of daylily hybrids donated by the Central Missouri Hemerocallis Society.
- Ellis Perennial Garden.
- Hydrangea: 10 varieties of the genus Hydrangea.
- Jefferson Garden: Includes cardinal flower, columbine, Virginia bluebells, sweetshrub, and Rose of Sharon. A bronze sculpture of Thomas Jefferson, as well as the original tombstone, a simple obelisk, which once sat next to Jefferson's grave, are also located in the garden.
- Life Sciences Discovery Garden.
- Mel Carnahan Quadrangle.
- Memorial Union Gardens.
- Native Missouri Tree Collection.
- Peony Garden: Features peonies, lilacs and other "old-fashioned" plants.
- Perennial Phlox Garden: Features 11 varieties of perennial phlox and English roses.
- Rothwell Family Garden.
- The Gardens on David R. Francis Quadrangle: More than 100 hardy, herbaceous perennials, with ornamental shrubs, trees and annual flowers woven throughout the garden.
- Tiger Plaza.
- Tree Trails: There are three self-guided walks designed to highlight the trees on campus.
- Wildlife Pond: In the 1920s, a spring north of Stephens Hall was transformed into a pond surrounded by a Japanese garden with an arched bridge and Pagoda gate. Recently several water plants native to Missouri, including Water Lilies, Pickerel Weed, Copper Iris and Thalia have been added.

== See also ==
- List of botanical gardens and arboretums in Missouri
