= Earnshaw Cook =

American mathematician (1900–1987)

Earnshaw Cook (March 28, 1900 – November 11, 1987) was an American early researcher and proponent of sabermetrics, the analysis of baseball through statistical means.

== Engineering ==
Cook was born in Reisterstown, Maryland in 1900. A member of the Princeton University class of 1921, he was an engineer specializing in metallurgy. He spent most of his working life at the American Brake Shoe Co. in Mahwah, New Jersey, later consulting on the Manhattan Project before retiring from the industry in 1945. In the 1950s and 1960s, Cook worked as a mechanical engineering professor at Johns Hopkins University, where he published several academic papers.

== Statistical baseball studies ==
Cook first set about his statistical baseball studies with the goal of proving that Ty Cobb, holder of the highest career batting average at .366, was better than Babe Ruth, the premier power hitter of the first half of the 20th century. Additionally Cook sought to understand strategic issues such as batting order and relief pitching, rather than accept the traditional strategies of baseball. Sports Illustrated writer Frank Deford learned of Cook's work and interviewed him for the lead story of a 1964 issue with the title "Baseball is Played All Wrong". Using tools of the time, such as a slide rule and a Friden STW mechanical calculator, Earnshaw Cook published the culmination of his work, Percentage Baseball (MIT Press), in 1964. Percentage Baseball was the first book of baseball statistics studies to gain national media attention. Though Cook received some support from Los Angeles Dodgers manager Walter Alston and Chicago White Sox owner Bill Veeck, most baseball executives and managers rejected Cook's mathematical approach and academic language. He was also criticized for lax mathematical models and inadequate numerical evidence by statisticians, such as George Lindsey (himself a baseball statistician), who advised that it be "kept out of the sight of students of the theory of probability." Modern author Michael Lewis describes Cook's prose as "crafted to alienate [baseball statistics] converts."

Among Cook's boldest assertions was that, utilizing his strategies, a team could gain up to 250 runs a season, a number which modern methods indicate is an extreme overestimate. Years later, sabermetrician Pete Palmer and sports historian John Thorn asserted that their computer simulations using Cook's lineup modifications slightly reduced the number of runs a team scored. Bill James would later write in his 1981 Baseball Abstract that "Cook knew everything about statistics and nothing at all about baseball—and for that reasons, all of his answers are wrong, all of his methods useless." Earnshaw Cook also dismissed the effects of player handedness (thus, condemning the use of the platoon system), which even contemporary studies showed to be erroneous. Cook did, however, uncover several important pieces of information which are now accepted as common knowledge in modern sabermetrics, such as the inefficiency of the sacrifice bunt. More importantly, the material generated discussion on statistical analysis in baseball and introduced many baseball fans to objective research. In 1971, Waverly Press published Cook's follow-up to Percentage Baseball titled Percentage Baseball and the Computer, in which Cook described many pieces of strategy suggested by his computer simulations.

== Influence and legacy ==
Cook never worked for a Major League baseball team; he described the relationship between himself and baseball franchises in the foreword to Percentage Baseball: "I would be willing to go as far as pretending to understand why none of four competent and successful executives of second-division ball clubs were most reluctant to employ probabilistic methods of any description... but they did not even want to hear about them!" Though Cook himself was never hired by a Major League team, his work influenced Major League Baseball personnel such as Tal Smith, Ewing Kauffman and Davey Johnson, as well as future sabermetricians like Palmer. Percentage Baseball also influenced Eric Walker, who worked for the San Francisco Giants and Sandy Alderson's Oakland Athletics. Cook's slide rule, which he used during his research for Percentage Baseball, was donated upon request to the Baseball Hall of Fame. Prior to his death, he had diminished eyesight and he and his wife, Elizabeth Cook, collaborated with Johns Hopkins on developing illuminated magnifying glasses for reading and research. His signature tie was a bow tie. He engineered a unique golf putter for himself and applied his statistical and rare metal analysis to golf as well. He served in the Navy during World War I and played baseball with his college roommate, Larry Keyes. Elizabeth Cook experienced college in England. Cook had no direct descendants. Earnshaw Cook died of a heart attack in 1987 in Baltimore, Maryland. Elizabeth Cook died in 1996.

Philip Roth based the character of the kid genius baseball coach Isaac Ellis in The Great American Novel on Cook.
