= Ed Lynch (baseball) =

American baseball player (born 1956)

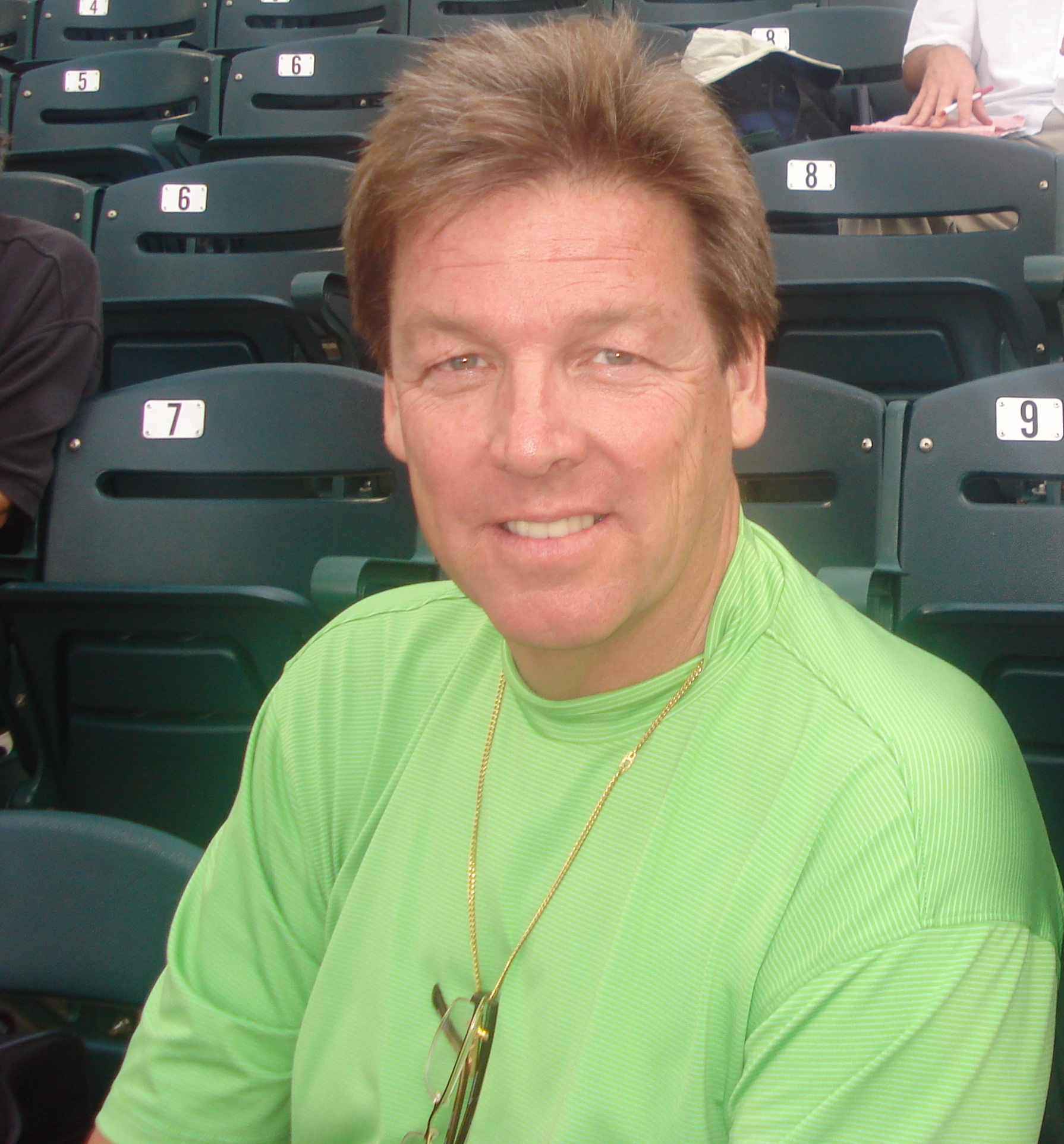
- Lynch in 2010
- Pitcher
- Born: February 25, 1956 (age 70); Brooklyn, New York, U.S.
- Batted: Right Threw: Right

MLB debut
- August 31, 1980, for the New York Mets

Last MLB appearance
- October 1, 1987, for the Chicago Cubs

MLB statistics
- Win–loss record: 47–54
- Earned run average: 4.00
- Strikeouts: 396
- Stats at Baseball Reference

Teams
- New York Mets (1980–1986); Chicago Cubs (1986–1987)

Edward Francis Lynch (born February 25, 1956) is an American former professional baseball pitcher and executive who played in Major League Baseball. He attended Christopher Columbus High School in Miami, Florida. During his career, he pitched and batted right-handed, and his pitch selection included a fastball, slider, changeup and slurve.

== MLB career ==
Lynch was drafted by the Texas Rangers in the 22nd round of the 1977 Major League Baseball draft. After three years in their farm system, in which he compiled a 22–27 record and 3.89 earned run average, the Rangers sent him to the New York Mets on September 18, 1979 as part of an earlier deal in which the Mets sent Willie Montañez to the Rangers for two players to be named later. The other player the Rangers sent the Mets was first baseman Mike Jorgensen.

Lynch debuted with the Mets on August 31, 1980 against the San Francisco Giants, and gave up four earned runs in just 1.1 inning out of the bullpen. He won his first major league start on September 13 against the Chicago Cubs, snapping a thirteen-game losing streak for his club. For the season, Lynch was 1–1 with a 5.12 ERA in four starts.

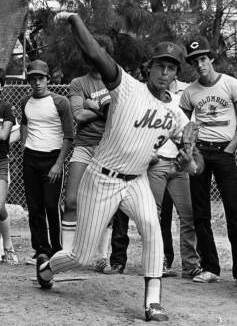
Lynch with the New York Mets in 1982

The Mets and Cubs were perennially the bottom two teams in the National League East for the early part of Lynch's career, however, they had evolved into division rivals at the top of the N.L. East by the time Lynch took the mound in the second game of a double header on August 7, 1984. The first game was won by the Cubs, 8–6, on the strength of a six-run fifth inning, which included a three-run home run by Keith Moreland. During a five-run fourth inning in the second game, Lynch hit Moreland with a pitch, inciting a bench clearing brawl. The Cubs won the second game, 8–4.

In 1985 Lynch went 10–8 with a 3.44 ERA in a career high 191 innings pitched. Baseball writer Bill James said at that time that Lynch had the best control of any National League pitcher other than LaMarr Hoyt. Lynch made only one appearance for the Mets in 1986, pitching 1.2 innings in relief in the third game of the season, when he went on the disabled list with torn cartilage in his left knee. By the time he was ready to return, he'd lost his spot in the starting rotation to the young pitchers on the 1986 World Champion squad. The Mets traded him to the Cubs for Dave Liddell and Dave Lenderman. He remained with the Cubs through 1987 before retiring.

== As an executive ==
After his career ended, he attended the University of Miami School of Law, and graduated in 1990. Using his Juris Doctor degree and prior baseball experience, he was named director of player development of the San Diego Padres. He was named assistant general manager of the New York Mets in 1994 and was named general manager of the Chicago Cubs on October 10, 1994. Ed then became a Major League scout for 16 years for the Cubs and Toronto Blue Jays. Ed currently resides in Scottsdale, Arizona with his wife Kristin and specializes in real estate with The Key Team at KMF Realty in Scottsdale Arizona.

== As a coach ==
Lynch was announced as the new pitching coach for the Long Island Ducks of the Atlantic League of Professional Baseball for the 2019 season. However, he resigned just two months into the season on June 25, 2019, in order to spend more time with his family.

Sporting positions
Preceded by Larry Himes	Chicago Cubs General Manager; 1994–2000	Succeeded by Andy MacPhail
