= Ewing Kauffman =

American pharmaceutical entrepreneur (1916–1993)

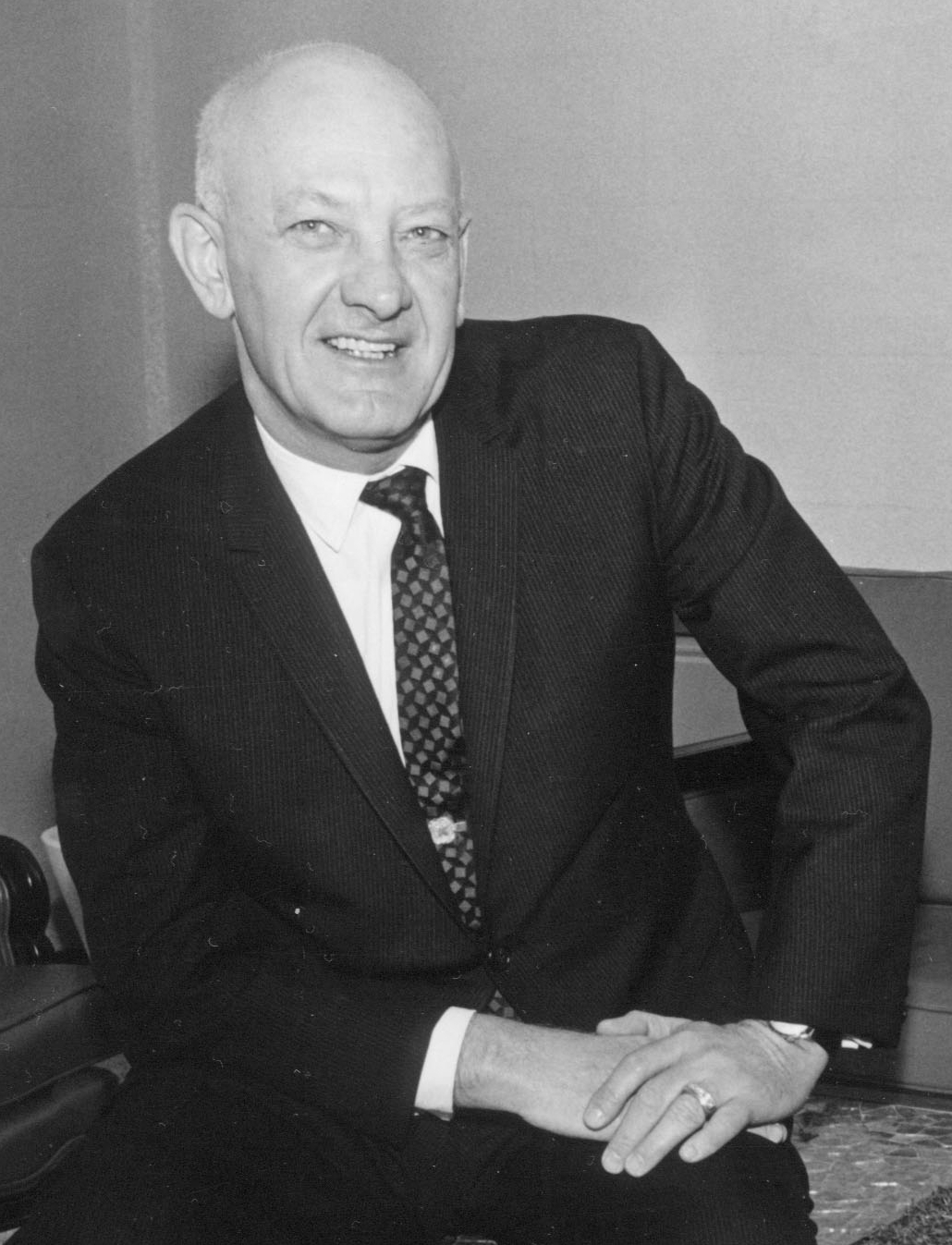
- Kauffman in 1968
- Born: Ewing Marion Kauffman; September 21, 1916 near Garden City, Missouri, U.S.
- Died: August 1, 1993 (aged 76); Mission Hills, Kansas, U.S.
- Education: • Westport High School; • Longview Community College
- Occupations: American pharmaceutical entrepreneur, philanthropist, and Major League Baseball team owner

Ewing Marion Kauffman (September 21, 1916 – August 1, 1993) was an American pharmaceutical entrepreneur, philanthropist, and Major League Baseball owner.

== Early life and education ==
Ewing Kauffman was born on September 21, 1916, on a farm near Garden City, Missouri. He was the son of John S. Kauffman and Effie May Winders, who were German-Americans. When Kauffman was a child, his father was in a farming accident which left him blind in his right eye. Following the accident, his father relocated the family to Kansas City, where he worked as a life insurance salesman.

As a child, Kauffman loved reading. When he was 11, he had to leave school for a year, due to a heart valve that would not close completely. During this year, Kauffman taught himself how to speed read. It was not uncommon for him to read one to two books a day. In later years, Kauffman believes his success in the pharmaceutical business stemmed from his ability to read quickly. In 1928, when Kauffman was 12, his parents divorced. He lived with his mother, and his father remained active in his life. On days spent with his father, it was not uncommon for the two to compete in arithmetic competitions, the most common game being adding, subtracting, multiplying, and dividing the numbers on license plates.

Kauffman was an active youth who participated in various sports, and performed very well in school. He was also an Eagle Scout and later, in adulthood, was awarded the Distinguished Eagle Scout Award.

Kauffman graduated from Kansas City's Westport High School in 1934 and later attended Kansas City Junior College, He received his associate degree in Business Management.

== Career ==
=== Military ===
In 1942, Kauffman joined the military and served in the U.S. Navy as a signalman. He served in both Europe and the Philippines; after his discharge in 1945, he returned to Kansas City.

=== Lincoln Laboratories ===
In 1947, Kauffman became a commissioned salesman for Lincoln Laboratories, a pharmaceutical company based in Decatur, Illinois. Kauffman earned a 20 percent commissions on his sales, and eventually earned more than the president of the company. Kauffman became angry with the company and left in 1950 after it decreased his sales territory and cut his commission.

=== Marion Laboratories ===
After leaving Lincoln Laboratories, Kauffman formed Marion Laboratories with a $5,000 investment. The company was originally run out of his house, and there were four employees, consisting of Kauffman and his close friends. He reportedly chose to use his middle name, rather than his surname, in order to not appear to be a one-man operation.

With Kauffman as chairman, Marion Laboratories had revenues of $930 million in 1988, the year before it merged with Merrell Dow Pharmaceuticals to form Marion Merrell Dow. Kauffman became chairman emeritus of the new company. The company sale created more than 300 millionaires.

=== Ewing Marion Kauffman Foundation ===
Kauffman established the Ewing Marion Kauffman Foundation in the mid-1960s with the same sense of opportunity he brought to his business endeavors, and, with the same convictions. Kauffman wanted his foundation to be innovative – to fundamentally change people's lives. He wanted to help young people, especially those from disadvantaged backgrounds, get a quality education that would enable them to reach their full potential. He saw building enterprise as one of the most effective ways to realize individual promise and spur the economy. Today, the mission of the Kauffman Foundation follows his vision by focusing its grant making and operations on two areas: advancing entrepreneurship and improving the education of children and youth.

=== Kansas City Royals ===
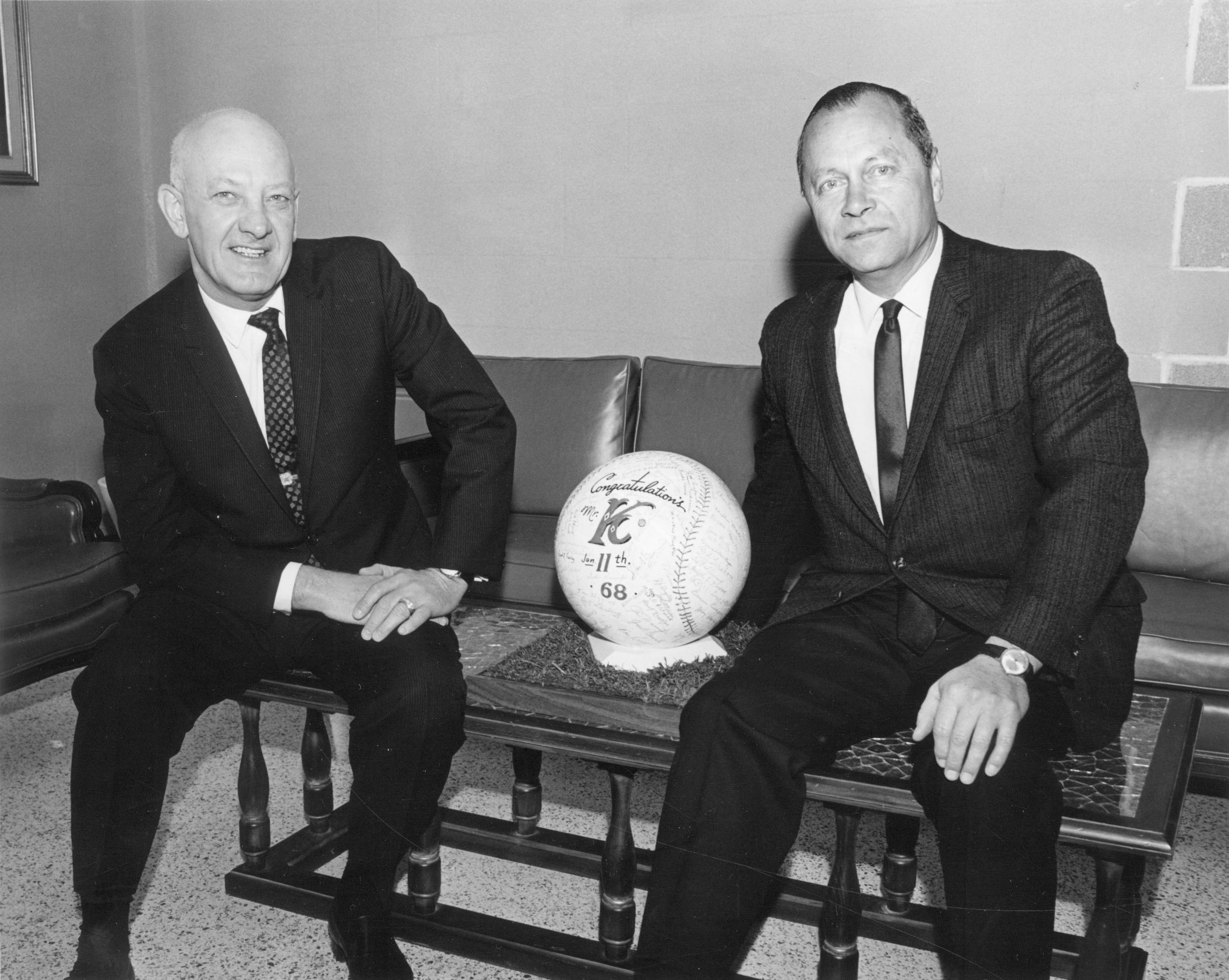
Kauffman with Royals general manager Cedric Tallis, 1968

After thirteen years in Kansas City, the Athletics moved to Oakland following the 1967 season. Inspired by his wife, who told him it would be a new frontier that would be good for him, Kauffman joined the forefront for the push for an expansion team in Kansas City, Missouri. On January 11, 1968, he was announced as owner of the new team, soon christened as the Kansas City Royals, bringing major league baseball back to the city for the 1969 season. He hired Cedric Tallis as the first general manager for the team, as he liked what he saw from Tallis when he was an executive of the Los Angeles Angels during their process of becoming a team in 1961. Described by one historian as "too far too ahead of his time" in terms of his management style in innovations, he strived to have the finest organization in baseball, setting a goal for a pennant in five years. Seeing the need to develop players into athletes, he established the Kansas City Royals Baseball Academy in 1971, although it closed three years later due to costs, much to the subsequent regret of Kauffman. He entertained the notions of Earnshaw Cook, an early researcher and proponent of sabermetrics. On April 10, 1973, Royals Stadium opened, and it would host the 1973 Major League Baseball All-Star Game a few months later; the stadium features included a privately funded fountain system that was among the largest in the world. While the Royals did not win a pennant in their fifth season, they won their first division title in 1976 before finally breaking through with a pennant in 1980. Five years later, the Royals won the Series, although it was their last playoff appearance under Kauffman as owner. They reached the postseason seven times in 24 full seasons (1969–1992) with Kauffman as an owner.

Kauffman had planned to sell the team by the 1980s. He had tried to sell a significant interest in the club (with an option to become majority owner down the road) to Michael Shapiro in the winter of 1982. This fell apart when Shapiro could not come up with the deposit; Shapiro sued Kauffman a few years later to no avail. He sold a minority stake to Avron D. Fogelman with an option for Fogelman to buy enough to be majority owner in 1991, but Fogelman had financial trouble that led him to sell back to Kauffman in 1990. Reported to have lost $7 million in 1990, Kauffman advocated for revenue sharing. In April 1993, he announced a succession plan that would see the team funded for eight years after his death to go with a board running the team to search for a new owner (as the Royals upon his death would essentially be owned by local Kansas City charities), which had to be a resident of Kansas City that would agree to not move the team (if eight years passed, a non-resident could buy the team, but the money of the sale would be distributed to charities). In May, he announced a diagnosis of cancer and was soon inducted into the team Hall of Fame. Despite his protests, Jackson County decided to name Royals Stadium in his honor, doing so on July 2. David Glass, who became the interim CEO and chairman of the Royals when Kauffman died, would eventually purchase the team and become its new owner in 2000.

On November 8, 2007, Kauffman was nominated to enter the Baseball Hall of Fame as part of the 2008 class; but was not elected. He was later nominated and elected to the Kansas Sports Hall of Fame in 2018.

=== Project Choice ===
In 1988, Kauffman launched Project Choice to the Westport High School Class of 1992. Project Choice promised to fund post-secondary education to all students who stayed in school, did not use drugs, did not become pregnant, and were committed to being an upstanding citizen in the community. To be eligible for the program, parents also had to agree to be involved in their child's education by attending meetings and participating in parent/teacher organizations and other activities. The program remained active until 2001. During those years, it expanded to five other high schools in the Kansas City metro area.

== Personal life ==
In 1962, he married Muriel Irene McBrien. He had two children from a previous marriage.

=== Death ===
Suffering from bone cancer, he died at his home in Mission Hills, Kansas, a suburb of Kansas City on August 1, 1993, at the age of 76. His remains are interred at the Ewing and Muriel Kauffman Memorial Garden next to the remains of his wife, who died in 1995.

== Awards and honors ==
- 1932 – Distinguished Eagle Scout Award as a member of Boy Scout Troop and Ship 100 at Faxon School in Kansas City, Missouri
- 1968 – Golden Plate Award of the American Academy of Achievement

• 1985 - World Series Champion, as Owner of Kansas City Royals

- 1993 – Kauffman Stadium, home to the Kansas City Royals of Major League Baseball, named after Ewing Kauffman
- 2018 – Kansas Sports Hall of Fame

== See also ==
- List of entrepreneurs
- List of people from Johnson County, Kansas
