= Donald Grenesko =

Donald C. Grenesko (born ca. 1949) is an American former business executive who worked for the Tribune Company from 1980 to 2008. During Tribune’s ownership of the Chicago Cubs, he served as club president from December 1988 to October 1991.

== Tribune Company ==
Grenesko served as vice president of corporate finance for Blunt, Ellis & Loewi, Inc. before joining the Tribune Company in June 1980 as treasury manager. He was named assistant treasurer in February 1981 and treasurer in October 1984.

Tribune, which owned the Chicago Cubs, named Grenesko executive vice president in charge of business operations for the team in February 1985. In December 1988, he was promoted to club president and chief executive officer.

In October 1991, Grenesko was named Tribune's vice president and chief financial officer, and he resigned as the Cubs' president.

In 2005, he was among several Tribune executives named in a class action lawsuit over allegations the company overstated circulation numbers in an effort to charge more for advertising.

In March 2008, Grenesko retired from Tribune. He was named a board director for Freedom Communications in February 2010.
