= 1983 Major League Baseball postseason =

1983 Major League Baseball playoffs

Tournament details
- Dates: October 4–16, 1983
- Teams: 4

Final positions
- Champions: Baltimore Orioles (3rd title)
- Runners-up: Philadelphia Phillies

Tournament statistics
- Games played: 13
- Attendance: 729,092 (56,084 per game)
- Most HRs: Gary Matthews (PHI) (4)
- Most SBs: Julio Cruz & Rudy Law (CHW) (2)
- Most Ks (as pitcher): Mike Boddicker (BAL) & Steve Carlton (PHI) (20)

Awards
- MVP: Rick Dempsey (BAL)

The 1983 Major League Baseball postseason was the playoff tournament of Major League Baseball for the 1983 season. The winners of each division advance to the postseason and face each other in a League Championship Series to determine the pennant winners that face each other in the World Series.

In the American League, the Baltimore Orioles made their seventh postseason appearance in the past fifteen years, and the Chicago White Sox made their first postseason appearance of the Divisional Era, marking the first time since 1959 that a Chicago MLB team made the postseason. This was the White Sox's last postseason appearance until 1993, and Baltimore's last postseason appearance until 1996.

In the National League, the Philadelphia Phillies returned to the postseason for the sixth time in eight years, and the Los Angeles Dodgers were making their fifth postseason appearance in the last seven years. This was Philadelphia's last postseason appearance until 1993.

The playoffs began on October 4, 1983, and concluded on October 16, 1983, with the Orioles defeating the Phillies in five games in the 1983 World Series. This was the first title since 1970 for the Orioles and third overall.

== Playoff seeds ==
American League Teams National League Teams

The following teams qualified for the postseason:

=== American League ===
- Baltimore Orioles – 98–64, AL East champions
- Chicago White Sox – 99–63, AL West champions

=== National League ===
- Philadelphia Phillies – 90–72, NL East champions
- Los Angeles Dodgers – 91–71, NL West champions

== Playoff bracket ==
League Championship Series (ALCS, NLCS)
East	Baltimore	3
West	Chicago White Sox	1
East	Philadelphia	3
West	Los Angeles	1

World Series
AL	Baltimore	4
NL	Philadelphia	1

== American League Championship Series ==
=== Chicago White Sox vs. Baltimore Orioles ===
Baltimore won the series, 3–1.

Game	Date	Score	Location	Time	Attendance
1	October 5	Chicago White Sox – 2, Baltimore Orioles – 1	Memorial Stadium	2:38	51,289
2	October 6	Chicago White Sox – 0, Baltimore Orioles – 4	Memorial Stadium	2:51	52,347
3	October 7	Baltimore Orioles – 11, Chicago White Sox – 1	Comiskey Park (I)	2:58	46,635
4	October 8	Baltimore Orioles – 3, Chicago White Sox – 0 (10)	Comiskey Park (I)	3:41	45,477

The Orioles defeated the White Sox in four games to reach their fifth World Series in the past fourteen years.

LaMarr Hoyt pitched a five-hit complete game as the White Sox stole Game 1 on the road. In Game 2, Mike Boddicker pitched a five-hit complete game shutout in response as the Orioles took Game 2 to even the series headed to Chicago. In Game 3, the Orioles blew out the White Sox to take the series lead. In Game 4, Chicago's Britt Burns had a complete game shutout bid ended in the top of the ninth as the game went into extras scoreless, where Baltimore's Tito Landrum hit a three-run home run in the top of the tenth to put the Orioles in the lead for good, securing the pennant. Game 4 was the last postseason game ever played at Comiskey Park.

The White Sox would return to the ALCS in 1993, but they lost to the eventual back-to-back World Series champion Toronto Blue Jays in six games. They would finally win the pennant in 2005 over the Los Angeles Angels of Anaheim in five games en route to a World Series title.

As of 2026, this is the last time the Orioles won the AL pennant. They would return to the ALCS in 1996, but lost to the eventual World Series champion New York Yankees in five games. Aside from the Seattle Mariners, who have yet to win a pennant, the Orioles currently hold the longest pennant drought of any American League team, which currently stands at 43 years, and is the third longest pennant drought in the majors.

== National League Championship Series ==
=== Philadelphia Phillies vs. Los Angeles Dodgers ===
Philadelphia won the series, 3–1.

Game	Date	Score	Location	Time	Attendance
1	October 4	Philadelphia Phillies – 1, Los Angeles Dodgers – 0	Dodger Stadium	2:17	55,254
2	October 5	Philadelphia Phillies – 1, Los Angeles Dodgers – 4	Dodger Stadium	2:44	55,967
3	October 7	Los Angeles Dodgers – 2, Philadelphia Phillies – 7	Veterans Stadium	2:51	53,490
4	October 8	Los Angeles Dodgers – 2, Philadelphia Phillies – 7	Veterans Stadium	2:50	64,494

This was the third postseason meeting between the Phillies and Dodgers. They last met in the NLCS in 1977 and 1978, with both being won by the Dodgers. This time, the Phillies returned the favor, finally defeating the Dodgers to reach the World Series for the second time in four years (in the process denying a rematch of the 1966 World Series between the Dodgers and Orioles).

Steve Carlton pitched seven innings of shutout ball and Al Holland earned a save as the Phillies stole Game 1 on the road. In Game 2, Fernando Valenzuela pitched eight solid innings as the Dodgers won to even the series headed to Philadelphia. There, things got ugly for the Dodgers as the Phillies would clinch the pennant after back-to-back blowout wins in Games 3 and 4.

The Phillies would win the pennant again a decade later over the Atlanta Braves in six games before falling in the World Series.

The Dodgers returned to the NLCS in 1985, but fell in six games to the St. Louis Cardinals. They would win their next pennant in 1988 over the New York Mets in seven games en route to a World Series title.

The Dodgers and Phillies would face off again in the NLCS in 2008 and 2009, with both series being won by the Phillies. They would also meet in the NLDS in 2025, which was won by the Dodgers en route to a World Series title.

== 1983 World Series ==
=== Baltimore Orioles (AL) vs. Philadelphia Phillies (NL) ===
Baltimore won the series, 4–1.

Game	Date	Score	Location	Time	Attendance
1	October 11	Philadelphia Phillies – 2, Baltimore Orioles – 1	Memorial Stadium	2:22	52,204
2	October 12	Philadelphia Phillies – 1, Baltimore Orioles – 4	Memorial Stadium	2:27	52,132
3	October 14	Baltimore Orioles – 3, Philadelphia Phillies – 2	Veterans Stadium	2:35	65,792
4	October 15	Baltimore Orioles – 5, Philadelphia Phillies – 4	Veterans Stadium	2:50	66,947
5	October 16	Baltimore Orioles – 5, Philadelphia Phillies – 0	Veterans Stadium	2:21	67,064

This was the third Maryland-Pennsylvania World Series matchup (1971, 1979). The Orioles previously lost the last two meetings to the Pittsburgh Pirates in seven games. The Orioles defeated the Phillies in five games to win their first title since 1970, and their third overall.

In Game 1, the Orioles led 1–0 after five innings of play, but solo home runs from Joe Morgan and Garry Maddox in the sixth and eighth innings respectively would secure the victory for the Phillies. Mike Boddicker pitched a three-hit complete game as the Orioles took Game 2 to even the series headed to Philadelphia. Game 2 was the last postseason game ever played at Memorial Stadium, and remains the most recent World Series game played in Baltimore to date. In Game 3, Jim Palmer earned a victory in relief as the Orioles took the lead in the series. With the Game 3 win, Palmer made MLB history as he became the first (and to date, only) pitcher to win a World Series game in three different decades. In Game 4, Tippy Martinez earned his second save of the series, ending a rally by the Phillies in the bottom of the ninth to give the Orioles a 3–1 series lead. In Game 5, Scott McGregor pitched a five-hit complete game shutout and Eddie Murray homered twice as the Orioles clinched the championship on the road.

The Phillies would return to the World Series in 1993, but they lost to the Toronto Blue Jays in six games. They would eventually win the title again in 2008 over the Tampa Bay Rays in five games.

As of 2026, this is Baltimore's last World Series victory and appearance. They currently possess the third longest World Series appearance drought and the sixth longest championship drought in the majors. Afterwards, the Orioles entered a slump, as the team would only make the postseason seven times since their last World Series win. The Orioles would make it as far as the ALCS in three of those appearances (1996, 1997, 2014), but they would lose all three.

== Broadcasting ==
NBC televised both LCS nationally in the United States. This was the last year that each team's local broadcaster was allowed to also televise coverage of LCS games.

ABC aired the World Series.
