= 1983 Major League Baseball season =

1983 MLB season
- League: American League (AL); National League (NL)
- Sport: Baseball
- Duration: Regular season: April 4 – October 2, 1983; Postseason: October 4–16, 1983
- Games: 162
- Teams: 26 (14 AL, 12 NL)
- TV partner(s): ABC, NBC, USA

Draft
- Top draft pick: Tim Belcher
- Picked by: Minnesota Twins

Regular season
- Season MVP: AL: Cal Ripken Jr. (BAL); NL: Dale Murphy (ATL)

Postseason
- AL champions: Baltimore Orioles
- AL runners-up: Chicago White Sox
- NL champions: Philadelphia Phillies
- NL runners-up: Los Angeles Dodgers

World Series
- Champions: Baltimore Orioles
- Runners-up: Philadelphia Phillies
- World Series MVP: Rick Dempsey (BAL)

MLB seasons
- ← 1982 1984 →

Locations of teams for the 1982–1988 American League seasons
West East
Locations of teams for the 1977–1992 National League seasons
West East

The 1983 major league baseball season began on April 4 while the regular season ended on October 2. The postseason began on October 4. The 80th World Series then began on October 11 and concluded on October 16 with the Baltimore Orioles of the American League defeating the Philadelphia Phillies of the National League, four games to one, to win their third title in franchise history.

The 54th All-Star Game was held on July 6 at Comiskey Park, home of the Chicago White Sox. The American League won, 13–3, and was the first by the league since 1971, and only the second since the second All-Star Game of 1962.

As of the end of the 2026 season this remains the most recent full season where no player hit for the cycle in a game (excluding the 2020 season, which was shortened due to the COVID-19 pandemic). This would be the final full season for Bowie Kuhn as commissioner of baseball.

== Schedule ==
The 1983 schedule consisted of 162 games for all 14 teams in the American League and 12 teams in the National League. Both leagues saw different schedule formats, as they had since 1977. The American League was split into two seven-team divisions. Each team was scheduled to play 13 games against their six division rivals, totaling 78 games, and 12 games against seven opponents, totaling 84 interdivision games. This format, used since 1979 would be used until the league realigned into three division for the 1994 season. Meanwhile, the National League was split into two six-team divisions. Each team was scheduled to play 18 games against their five division rivals, totaling 90 games, and 12 games against six interdivision opponents, totaling 72 games. This continued the format put in place since the 1969, and like the American League, would continue to be the format in use until 1993.

Opening Day took place on April 4, featuring eight teams. The final day of the scheduled regular season was on October 2, featuring all 26 teams. The National League Championship Series took place between October 4 and October 8, while the American League Championship Series took place between October 5 and October 8. The World Series took place between October 11 and October 16.

=== Pine Tar Game ===
On July 24, in the game now known as the Pine Tar Incident, George Brett hits an apparent go-ahead 2-run home run off Goose Gossage in the ninth inning of a game against the New York Yankees at Yankee Stadium. However, Yankees manager Billy Martin challenges that Brett's bat had more than the 18 inches (460 mm) of pine tar allowed, and home plate umpire Tim McClelland upholds Martin's challenge. After being called out and having the home run nullified, Brett goes ballistic and charges out of the dugout after McClelland. The AL president's office later upholds the Kansas City Royals protest, restoring the home run, and the game is completed on August 18, with the Royals winning 5–4.

== Rule change ==
The 1983 season saw the following rule change:

- All players, when wearing a helmet while at bat, must wear a single ear-flap helmet, in the direction of the pitcher (though players could wear a double ear-flap helmet, if they preferred). Players who objected to wearing a flap in the 1982 season were granted an exemption from this rule.

== Teams ==
League	Division	Team	City	Ballpark	Capacity	Manager
American League	East	Baltimore Orioles	Baltimore, Maryland	Baltimore Memorial Stadium	52,860	Joe Altobelli
American League	East	Boston Red Sox	Boston, Massachusetts	Fenway Park	33,538	Ralph Houk
American League	East	Cleveland Indians	Cleveland, Ohio	Cleveland Stadium	74,483	Mike Ferraro
American League	East	Cleveland Indians	Cleveland, Ohio	Cleveland Stadium	74,483	Pat Corrales
American League	East	Detroit Tigers	Detroit, Michigan	Tiger Stadium	52,806	Sparky Anderson
American League	East	Milwaukee Brewers	Milwaukee, Wisconsin	Milwaukee County Stadium	53,192	Harvey Kuenn
American League	East	New York Yankees	New York, New York	Yankee Stadium	57,545	Billy Martin
American League	East	Toronto Blue Jays	Toronto, Ontario	Exhibition Stadium	43,737	Bobby Cox
American League	West	California Angels	Anaheim, California	Anaheim Stadium	64,573	John McNamara
American League	West	Chicago White Sox	Chicago, Illinois	Comiskey Park	44,492	Tony La Russa
American League	West	Kansas City Royals	Kansas City, Missouri	Royals Stadium	40,613	Dick Howser
American League	West	Minnesota Twins	Minneapolis, Minnesota	Hubert H. Humphrey Metrodome	54,711	Billy Gardner
American League	West	Oakland Athletics	Oakland, California	Oakland–Alameda County Coliseum	50,000	Steve Boros
American League	West	Seattle Mariners	Seattle, Washington	Kingdome	59,059	Rene Lachemann
American League	West	Seattle Mariners	Seattle, Washington	Kingdome	59,059	Del Crandall
American League	West	Texas Rangers	Arlington, Texas	Arlington Stadium	41,284	Doug Rader
National League	East	Chicago Cubs	Chicago, Illinois	Wrigley Field	37,702	Lee Elia
National League	East	Chicago Cubs	Chicago, Illinois	Wrigley Field	37,702	Charlie Fox
National League	East	Montreal Expos	Montreal, Quebec	Olympic Stadium	59,149	Bill Virdon
National League	East	New York Mets	New York, New York	Shea Stadium	55,300	George Bamberger
National League	East	New York Mets	New York, New York	Shea Stadium	55,300	Frank Howard
National League	East	Philadelphia Phillies	Philadelphia, Pennsylvania	Veterans Stadium	62,382	Pat Corrales
National League	East	Philadelphia Phillies	Philadelphia, Pennsylvania	Veterans Stadium	62,382	Paul Owens
National League	East	Pittsburgh Pirates	Pittsburgh, Pennsylvania	Three Rivers Stadium	58,722	Chuck Tanner
National League	East	St. Louis Cardinals	St. Louis, Missouri	Busch Stadium	53,138	Whitey Herzog
National League	West	Atlanta Braves	Atlanta, Georgia	Atlanta–Fulton County Stadium	52,934	Joe Torre
National League	West	Cincinnati Reds	Cincinnati, Ohio	Riverfront Stadium	52,953	Russ Nixon
National League	West	Houston Astros	Houston, Texas	Houston Astrodome	47,000	Bob Lillis
National League	West	Los Angeles Dodgers	Los Angeles, California	Dodger Stadium	56,000	Tommy Lasorda
National League	West	San Diego Padres	San Diego, California	Jack Murphy Stadium	50,000	Dick Williams
National League	West	San Francisco Giants	San Francisco, California	Candlestick Park	58,495	Frank Robinson

== Standings ==
=== American League ===
AL East
Team	W	L	Pct.	GB	Home	Road
Baltimore Orioles	98	64	.605	—	50‍–‍31	48‍–‍33
Detroit Tigers	92	70	.568	6	48‍–‍33	44‍–‍37
New York Yankees	91	71	.562	7	51‍–‍30	40‍–‍41
Toronto Blue Jays	89	73	.549	9	48‍–‍33	41‍–‍40
Milwaukee Brewers	87	75	.537	11	52‍–‍29	35‍–‍46
Boston Red Sox	78	84	.481	20	38‍–‍43	40‍–‍41
Cleveland Indians	70	92	.432	28	36‍–‍45	34‍–‍47

AL West
Team	W	L	Pct.	GB	Home	Road
Chicago White Sox	99	63	.611	—	55‍–‍26	44‍–‍37
Kansas City Royals	79	83	.488	20	45‍–‍36	34‍–‍47
Texas Rangers	77	85	.475	22	44‍–‍37	33‍–‍48
Oakland Athletics	74	88	.457	25	42‍–‍39	32‍–‍49
California Angels	70	92	.432	29	35‍–‍46	35‍–‍46
Minnesota Twins	70	92	.432	29	37‍–‍44	33‍–‍48
Seattle Mariners	60	102	.370	39	30‍–‍51	30‍–‍51

=== National League ===
NL East
Team	W	L	Pct.	GB	Home	Road
Philadelphia Phillies	90	72	.556	—	50‍–‍31	40‍–‍41
Pittsburgh Pirates	84	78	.519	6	41‍–‍40	43‍–‍38
Montreal Expos	82	80	.506	8	46‍–‍35	36‍–‍45
St. Louis Cardinals	79	83	.488	11	44‍–‍37	35‍–‍46
Chicago Cubs	71	91	.438	19	43‍–‍38	28‍–‍53
New York Mets	68	94	.420	22	41‍–‍41	27‍–‍53

NL West
Team	W	L	Pct.	GB	Home	Road
Los Angeles Dodgers	91	71	.562	—	48‍–‍32	43‍–‍39
Atlanta Braves	88	74	.543	3	46‍–‍34	42‍–‍40
Houston Astros	85	77	.525	6	46‍–‍36	39‍–‍41
San Diego Padres	81	81	.500	10	47‍–‍34	34‍–‍47
San Francisco Giants	79	83	.488	12	43‍–‍38	36‍–‍45
Cincinnati Reds	74	88	.457	17	36‍–‍45	38‍–‍43

=== Tie games ===
3 tie games (1 in AL, 2 in NL), which are not factored into winning percentage or games behind (and were often replayed again) occurred throughout the season.

==== American League ====
The Kansas City Royals and Texas Rangers had one tie each.

- May 24, Texas Rangers vs. Kansas City Royals, tied at 2 following a shortened five innings on account of a rain delay.

==== National League ====
The Los Angeles Dodgers, Montreal Expos, Philadelphia Phillies, and San Diego Padres had one tie each.

- June 28, Montreal Expos vs. Philadelphia Phillies, tied at 5 through two outs into the bottom of the 11th inning, on account of rain.
- September 28, Los Angeles Dodgers vs. San Diego Padres, tied at 4 through one out into the top of the 14th inning, on account of rain.

== Postseason ==
The postseason began on October 4 and ended on October 16 with the Baltimore Orioles defeating the Philadelphia Phillies in the 1983 World Series in five games.

=== Bracket ===
League Championship Series (ALCS, NLCS)
East	Baltimore	3
West	Chicago White Sox	1
East	Philadelphia	3
West	Los Angeles	1

World Series
AL	Baltimore	4
NL	Philadelphia	1

== League leaders ==
=== American League ===
Hitting leaders
Stat	Player	Total
AVG	Wade Boggs (BOS)	.361
OPS	George Brett (KC)	.947
HR	Jim Rice (BOS)	39
RBI	Cecil Cooper (MIL); Jim Rice (BOS)	126
R	Cal Ripken Jr. (BAL)	121
H	Cal Ripken Jr. (BAL)	211
SB	Rickey Henderson (OAK)	108

Pitching leaders
Stat	Player	Total
W	LaMarr Hoyt (CWS)	24
L	Larry Gura (KC)	18
ERA	Rick Honeycutt (TEX)	2.42
K	Jack Morris (DET)	232
IP	Jack Morris (DET)	293.2
SV	Dan Quisenberry (KC)	45
WHIP	LaMarr Hoyt (CWS)	1.024

=== National League ===
Hitting leaders
Stat	Player	Total
AVG	Bill Madlock (PIT)	.323
OPS	Dale Murphy (ATL)	.933
HR	Mike Schmidt (PHI)	40
RBI	Dale Murphy (ATL)	121
R	Tim Raines (MON)	133
H	José Cruz (HOU); Andre Dawson (MON)	189
SB	Tim Raines (MON)	90

Pitching leaders
Stat	Player	Total
W	John Denny (PHI)	19
L	Mike Torrez (NYM)	17
ERA	Atlee Hammaker (SF)	2.25
K	Steve Carlton (PHI)	275
IP	Steve Carlton (PHI)	283.2
SV	Lee Smith (CHC)	29
WHIP	Atlee Hammaker (SF)	1.039

== Managerial changes ==
=== Off-season ===
Team	Former Manager	New Manager
Baltimore Orioles	Earl Weaver	Joe Altobelli
California Angels	Gene Mauch	John McNamara
Cleveland Indians	Dave Garcia	Mike Ferraro
Montreal Expos	Jim Fanning	Bill Virdon
New York Yankees	Clyde King	Billy Martin
Oakland Athletics	Billy Martin	Steve Boros
Texas Rangers	Darrell Johnson	Doug Rader

=== In-season ===
Team	Former Manager	New Manager
Chicago Cubs	Lee Elia	Charlie Fox
Cleveland Indians	Mike Ferraro	Pat Corrales
New York Mets	George Bamberger	Frank Howard
Philadelphia Phillies	Pat Corrales	Paul Owens
Seattle Mariners	Rene Lachemann	Del Crandall

== Milestones ==
=== Pitchers ===
==== No-hitters ====
- Dave Righetti (NYY):
  - Righetti threw his first no-hitter and seventh no-hitter in franchise history, by defeating the Boston Red Sox 4–0 on July 4. He walked four and struck out nine.
- Bob Forsch (STL):
  - Forsch threw his second no-hitter and eighth no-hitter in franchise history, by defeating the Montreal Expos 3–0 on September 26. He walked none and struck out eight. He missed a perfect game due to a hit by pitch and a fielding error by the second baseman in the second inning.
- Mike Warren (OAK):
  - Warren threw his first no-hitter and ninth no-hitter in franchise history, by defeating the Chicago White Sox 3–0 on September 29. He walked three and struck out five.

==== Other pitching accomplishments ====
- Don Sutton (MIL):
  - Recorded his 3,000th career strikeout on June 24 by striking out Alan Bannister of the Cleveland Indians in the eighth inning. Sutton becomes the eighth player to reach this mark.
- Nolan Ryan (HOU):
  - Set a Major League record in career strikeouts by striking out Brad Mills of the Montreal Expos. It is the 3,509th strikeout of Ryan's career, breaking the long time record established by Walter Johnson. Ryan will go on to break his own record 2,205 times before retiring.
- Steve Carlton (PHI):
  - Became the 16th member of the 300-win club, defeating the St. Louis Cardinals on September 23, winning 6–2.

=== Miscellaneous ===
- Philadelphia Phillies:
  - Defeat the Chicago Cubs 13–6 on September 28, for the 7,000th regular season win in their history to clinch the National League East Division title.
- Texas Rangers:
  - Score twelve runs in the fifteenth inning on July 3 to defeat the Oakland Athletics 16–4, in the process breaking the MLB record for most runs scored during one single extra inning, previously held by the 1928 New York Yankees.
- Steve Garvey (SD):
  - Ends his streak of 1,207 consecutive games played after dislocating his thumb on July 29. It is still the National League record for consecutive games played, but less than half the American League and MLB record of 2,632 by Cal Ripken Jr. from 1982–1998.

== Awards and honors ==
Baseball Writers' Association of America Awards
BBWAA Award	National League	American League
Rookie of the Year	Darryl Strawberry (NYM)	Ron Kittle (CWS)
Cy Young Award	John Denny (PHI)	LaMarr Hoyt (CWS)
Manager of the Year	Tommy Lasorda (LAD)	Tony La Russa (CWS)
Most Valuable Player	Dale Murphy (ATL)	Cal Ripken Jr. (BAL)
Babe Ruth Award (World Series MVP)	—	Rick Dempsey (BAL)
Gold Glove Awards
Position	National League	American League
Pitcher	Phil Niekro (ATL)	Ron Guidry (NYY)
Catcher	Tony Peña (PIT)	Lance Parrish (DET)
First Baseman	Keith Hernandez (NYM/STL)	Eddie Murray (BAL)
Second Baseman	Ryne Sandberg (CHC)	Lou Whitaker (DET)
Third Baseman	Mike Schmidt (PHI)	Buddy Bell (TEX)
Shortstop	Ozzie Smith (STL)	Alan Trammell (DET)
Outfielders	Andre Dawson (MON)	Dwight Evans (BOS)
Outfielders	Willie McGee (STL)	Dwayne Murphy (OAK)
Outfielders	Dale Murphy (ATL)	Dave Winfield (NYY)
Silver Slugger Awards
Pitcher/Designated Hitter	Fernando Valenzuela (LAD)	Don Baylor (NYY)
Catcher	Terry Kennedy (SD)	Lance Parrish (DET)
First Baseman	George Hendrick (STL)	Eddie Murray (BAL)
Second Baseman	Johnny Ray (PIT)	Lou Whitaker (DET)
Third Baseman	Mike Schmidt (PHI)	Wade Boggs (BOS)
Shortstop	Dickie Thon (HOU)	Cal Ripken Jr. (BAL)
Outfielders	José Cruz (HOU)	Lloyd Moseby (TOR)
Outfielders	Andre Dawson (MON)	Jim Rice (BOS)
Outfielders	Dale Murphy (ATL)	Dave Winfield (NYY)

=== Other awards ===
- Outstanding Designated Hitter Award: Greg Luzinski (CWS)
- Roberto Clemente Award (Humanitarian): Cecil Cooper (MIL)
- Hutch Award: Ray Knight (HOU)
- League Championship Series Most Valuable Player Award: Gary Matthews (PHI, National); Mike Boddicker (BAL, American)
- Rolaids Relief Man Award: Al Holland (PHI, National); Dan Quisenberry (KC, American)
- Sport Magazine's World Series Most Valuable Player Award: Rick Dempsey (BAL)

The Sporting News Awards
Award	National League	American League
Player of the Year	—	Cal Ripken Jr. (BAL)
Pitcher of the Year	John Denny (PHI)	LaMarr Hoyt (CWS)
Fireman of the Year (Relief pitcher)	Al Holland (PHI); Lee Smith (CHC)	Dan Quisenberry (KC)
Rookie Player of the Year	Darryl Strawberry (NYM)	Ron Kittle (CWS)
Rookie Pitcher of the Year	Craig McMurtry (ATL)	Mike Boddicker (BAL)
Comeback Player of the Year	John Denny (PHI)	Alan Trammell (DET)
Manager of the Year	—	Tony La Russa (CWS)
Executive of the Year	—	Hank Peters (BAL)

=== Monthly awards ===
==== Player of the Month ====
Month	National League	American League
April	Terry Kennedy (SD)	George Brett (KC)
May	Darrell Evans (SF)	Rod Carew (CAL)
June	Andre Dawson (MON)	Lou Whitaker (DET)
July	Dusty Baker (LAD)	Cecil Cooper (MIL)
August	Mel Hall (CHC)	Lloyd Moseby (TOR)
September	Dale Murphy (ATL)	Cal Ripken Jr. (BAL)

==== Pitcher of the Month ====
Month	American League	National League
April	Pascual Pérez (ATL)	Rick Honeycutt (TEX)
May	Bill Laskey (SF)	Dave Stieb (TOR)
June	Burt Hooton (LAD)	Charlie Hough (TEX)
July	Joe Price (CIN)	Scott McGregor (BAL)
August	Jesse Orosco (NYM)	Jack Morris (DET)
September	John Denny (PHI)	Richard Dotson (CWS)

=== Baseball Hall of Fame ===
- George Kell
- Juan Marichal
- Brooks Robinson
- Walter Alston (manager)

== Home field attendance ==
Team name	Wins	%±	Home attendance	%±	Per game
Los Angeles Dodgers	91	3.4%	3,510,313	−2.7%	43,879
California Angels	70	−24.7%	2,555,016	−9.0%	31,543
Milwaukee Brewers	87	−8.4%	2,397,131	21.1%	29,594
Montreal Expos	82	−4.7%	2,320,651	0.1%	28,650
St. Louis Cardinals	79	−14.1%	2,317,914	9.8%	28,616
New York Yankees	91	15.2%	2,257,976	10.6%	27,876
Chicago White Sox	99	13.8%	2,132,821	36.0%	26,331
Philadelphia Phillies	90	1.1%	2,128,339	−10.4%	25,955
Atlanta Braves	88	−1.1%	2,119,935	17.6%	26,499
Baltimore Orioles	98	4.3%	2,042,071	26.6%	25,211
Kansas City Royals	79	−12.2%	1,963,875	−14.0%	23,950
Toronto Blue Jays	89	14.1%	1,930,415	51.3%	23,832
Detroit Tigers	92	10.8%	1,829,636	11.8%	22,588
Boston Red Sox	78	−12.4%	1,782,285	−8.6%	22,004
San Diego Padres	81	0.0%	1,539,815	−4.2%	18,778
Chicago Cubs	71	−2.7%	1,479,717	18.4%	18,268
Texas Rangers	77	20.3%	1,363,469	18.1%	16,833
Houston Astros	85	10.4%	1,351,962	−13.3%	16,487
Oakland Athletics	74	8.8%	1,294,941	−25.4%	15,987
San Francisco Giants	79	−9.2%	1,251,530	4.2%	15,451
Pittsburgh Pirates	84	0.0%	1,225,916	19.7%	15,135
Cincinnati Reds	74	21.3%	1,190,419	−10.3%	14,697
New York Mets	68	4.6%	1,112,774	−15.9%	13,570
Minnesota Twins	70	16.7%	858,939	−6.8%	10,604
Seattle Mariners	60	−21.1%	813,537	−24.0%	10,044
Cleveland Indians	70	−10.3%	768,941	−26.3%	9,493

== Media ==
=== Television ===
This was the last season of USA Network Thursday Night Baseball, as MLB decided to only renew the contracts with ABC and NBC.

Network	Day of week	Announcers
ABC	Monday nights Sunday afternoons	Al Michaels, Howard Cosell, Earl Weaver, Don Drysdale, Steve Stone
NBC	Saturday afternoons	Vin Scully, Joe Garagiola, Bob Costas, Tony Kubek
USA	Thursday nights	Eddie Doucette, Nelson Briles, Monte Moore, Wes Parker

== Retired numbers ==
- Bill Terry had his No. 3 retired by the San Francisco Giants on April 5. This was the fifth number retired by the team.
- Minnie Miñoso had his No. 9 retired by the Chicago White Sox on May 8. This was the third number retired by the team.
- On June 12, the Detroit Tigers retired two numbers, their second and third numbers retired by the team.
  - Charlie Gehringer had his No. 2 retired.
  - Hank Greenberg had his No. 5 retired.
- Juan Marichal had his No. 27 retired by the San Francisco Giants on July 10. This was the sixth number retired by the team.

== See also ==
- 1983 in baseball (Events, Movies, Births, Deaths)
- 1983 Nippon Professional Baseball season
