= 1983 American League Championship Series =

15th edition of Major League Baseball's American League Championship Series

Team (Wins)	Managers	Season
Baltimore Orioles (3)	Joe Altobelli	98–64, .605, GA: 6
Chicago White Sox (1)	Tony La Russa	99–63, .611, GA: 20
- Dates: October 5–8
- MVP: Mike Boddicker (Baltimore)
- Umpires: Jim McKean; Durwood Merrill; Nick Bremigan; Jim Evans; Dave Phillips (crew chief); Mike Reilly

Broadcast
- Television: NBC; WMAR-TV (Orioles' broadcast); WFLD-TV (White Sox' broadcast)
- TV announcers: NBC: Bob Costas and Tony Kubek; WMAR-TV: Chuck Thompson and Brooks Robinson; WFLD-TV: Don Drysdale, Early Wynn, Ken Harrelson and Joe McConnell
- Radio: CBS; WFBR (Orioles' broadcast); WMAQ (White Sox' broadcast)
- Radio announcers: CBS: Ernie Harwell and Curt Gowdy; WFBR: Jon Miller and Tom Marr; WMAQ: Drysdale, Wynn, Harrelson, McConnell and Lorn Brown

The 1983 American League Championship Series was a semifinal series in Major League Baseball's 1983 postseason played between the Chicago White Sox and the Baltimore Orioles from October 5 to 8.

The Orioles won the series three games to one. Although the White Sox took Game 1 by a score of 2–1, the Orioles came back to win the last three games of the series. The Orioles went on to defeat the Philadelphia Phillies in five games in the 1983 World Series. In the regular season the White Sox won the West Division by 20 games with a 99–63 record. The Orioles won the East Division by six games with a 98–64 record.

This series was the first in which the Orioles lost the first game. In their five previous World Series and six previous ALCS appearances, the Orioles had won every opener.

As of 2026, this is the last time the Orioles won the AL pennant, and currently hold the third longest pennant drought in the majors.

== Background ==
=== "Winning Ugly" White Sox ===
In the early 1980s, the sports scene in Chicago was dire. The White Sox had not been to the postseason since losing the 1959 World Series, the Cubs had not been to a World Series since losing in 1945, the Blackhawks had not won a Stanley Cup since 1961, the Bears had not won a championship since 1963, and the Bulls had moderate success with a defensive first approach under Dick Motta but they could never get over the hump against the more talented Lakers or Warriors; they had also never been to an NBA Finals.

By 1983, the city was starved for a winner of any kind. The 1983 White Sox AL West division crown was the city of Chicago's first baseball championship of any kind (division, league, or world) in twenty-four years. Their “win ugly” nickname was given to them by Texas Rangers manager Doug Rader. The club rattled off a modest win streak around the All-Star break, but according to Rader their success would be short-lived, stating "they're not playing that well... they're winning ugly". Behind manager Tony La Russa, catcher Carlton Fisk, outfielder Harold Baines, and designated hitter Ron Kittle, the "Winning Ugly" Sox finished the season 60–25.

=== Orioles ===
Since winning the city's second championship in 1970, Baltimore had suffered a decade full of heartbreak, losing in the World Series to Pittsburgh in 1971 and 1979 (the latter after being up 3 games to 1); losing postseason series to Oakland in 1973 and 1974; and losing close AL East races in 1975, 1977, 1980, 1981 and 1982.

The 1983 season was the Orioles' first in nearly 15 years without manager Earl Weaver, who retired after the Orioles missed the playoffs in the final game of the 1982 season. The Orioles replaced Weaver with Joe Altobelli, who had been an Orioles manager in the Baltimore's farm system from 1971 to 1976. The Orioles went 58–31 from July through the end of the regular season, pulling away from Detroit, New York and Milwaukee in September in what had been a tough AL East race in years prior.

== Summary ==
=== Chicago White Sox vs. Baltimore Orioles ===
Baltimore won the series, 3–1.

Game	Date	Score	Location	Time	Attendance
1	October 5	Chicago White Sox – 2, Baltimore Orioles – 1	Memorial Stadium	2:38	51,289
2	October 6	Chicago White Sox – 0, Baltimore Orioles – 4	Memorial Stadium	2:51	52,347
3	October 7	Baltimore Orioles – 11, Chicago White Sox – 1	Comiskey Park (I)	2:58	46,635
4	October 8	Baltimore Orioles – 3, Chicago White Sox – 0 (10)	Comiskey Park (I)	3:41	45,477

== Game summaries ==
=== Game 1 ===
October 5, 1983 3:05 pm (ET) at Memorial Stadium in Baltimore, Maryland
Team	1	2	3	4	5	6	7	8	9	R	H	E
Chicago	0	0	1	0	0	1	0	0	0	2	7	0
Baltimore	0	0	0	0	0	0	0	0	1	1	5	1
WP: LaMarr Hoyt (1–0) LP: Scott McGregor (0–1)

Playing in their first postseason game since the 1959 World Series, the White Sox jumped to a 1–0 ALCS lead behind a complete-game victory by LaMarr Hoyt, the American League Cy Young Award winner. In the third, consecutive two out singles by Rudy Law, Carlton Fisk and Tom Paciorek off Scott McGregor plated Chicago's first run. After a 42-minute rain delay in the fourth inning, the White Sox made it 2–0 when Paciorek walked to lead off the sixth, moved to third when Greg Luzinski reached on an Eddie Murray error and scored when Rookie of the Year Ron Kittle grounded into a double play. In the bottom of the ninth, Dan Ford doubled with two outs then Pinch Runner Tito Landrum scored as Cal Ripken Jr. denied Hoyt's shutout with an RBI single for the Orioles' only run.

=== Game 2 ===
October 6, 1983 8:20 pm (ET) at Memorial Stadium in Baltimore, Maryland
Team	1	2	3	4	5	6	7	8	9	R	H	E
Chicago	0	0	0	0	0	0	0	0	0	0	5	2
Baltimore	0	1	0	1	0	2	0	0	X	4	6	0
WP: Mike Boddicker (1–0) LP: Floyd Bannister (0–1); Home runs: CWS: None; BAL: Gary Roenicke (1)

Mike Boddicker evened the series with a dominant performance, striking out 14 batters while allowing just five singles and three walks in a shutout victory. Gary Roenicke doubled to lead off the second off Floyd Bannister, and then scored on Vance Law's throwing error on Ken Singleton's groundball. In the fourth, Roenicke walked with one out, then scored on Singleton's double. In the sixth, Cal Ripken Jr. hit a lead off double off the left field wall, moved to third on Eddie Murray’s fly out to centerfield and then came home as Roenicke capped the game's scoring with a two-run home run to give the Orioles a 4–0 win.

=== Game 3 ===
October 7, 1983 7:20 pm (CT) at Comiskey Park (I) in Chicago, Illinois
Team	1	2	3	4	5	6	7	8	9	R	H	E
Baltimore	3	1	0	0	2	0	0	1	4	11	8	0
Chicago	0	1	0	0	0	0	0	0	0	1	6	1
WP: Mike Flanagan (1–0) LP: Richard Dotson (0–1) Sv: Sammy Stewart (1); Home runs: BAL: Eddie Murray (1); CWS: None

With the series shifting to Chicago, White Sox starter Richard Dotson was rocked for six runs, all earned, over five innings, as the Orioles pushed Chicago to the brink of elimination. In the top of the first with one out, Jim Dwyer doubled, Cal Ripken Jr. hit an infield single and Eddie Murray belted a 2-0 pitch into the upper deck for a three-run homer to start the scoring. Next inning, Rick Dempsey walked with two outs and scored on Al Bumbry's double. The White Sox scored their only run of the game in the bottom of the second off Mike Flanagan when Ron Kittle hit a leadoff double and scored on Vance Law's single. In the fifth, Cal Ripken Jr. was hit by a pitch with two-out and then a subsequent walk to Eddie Murray was followed by a two-run double by John Lowenstein who was thrown out trying for three to end the inning. During Murray's at bat in the 5th, the first pitch nearly hit him and led to the benches clearing with no punches being thrown. In the eighth, Eddie Murray walked, stole second, advanced to third on Rich Dauer's flyout and then scored on Todd Cruz's RBI single with two out off Dick Tidrow to make it 7–1 Orioles. In the top of the ninth, a double by Cal Ripken Jr. sandwiched in between walks to John Shelby and Eddie Murray loaded the bases off Jerry Koosman. Dennis Lamp in relief walked Gary Roenicke to force in a run, then left fielder Jerry Hairston's error on Joe Nolan's fly ball allowed two more runs to score before Rich Dauer's sacrifice fly capped the scoring at 11–1 Orioles. Flanagan pitched five innings while Sammy Stewart pitched four shutout innings while allowing only one hit to close out the win.

=== Game 4 ===
October 8, 1983 12:05 pm (CT) at Comiskey Park (I) in Chicago, Illinois
Team	1	2	3	4	5	6	7	8	9	10	R	H	E
Baltimore	0	0	0	0	0	0	0	0	0	3	3	9	0
Chicago	0	0	0	0	0	0	0	0	0	0	0	10	0
WP: Tippy Martinez (1–0) LP: Britt Burns (0–1); Home runs: BAL: Tito Landrum (1); CWS: None

With his team facing elimination, White Sox manager Tony La Russa decided to save Hoyt for a potential game 5 start and went with Britt Burns instead. Burns pitched nine scoreless innings, but the Sox could not push across a run. Chicago missed its best opportunity to score in the 7th. Greg Walker and Vance Law singled then Jerry Dybzinski attempted to bunt the runners over but the lead runner was forced at third. Then with one out and runners on first and second, Julio Cruz singled to left field. Third base coach Jim Leyland held the lead runner Vance Law at third but Dybzinski did not see that in time and got caught halfway between second and third. As Baltimore began to execute the run down, Law broke for home and was thrown out while barreling into Rick Dempsey. After a Tippy Martinez balk moved the runners up, Rudy Law lined out to left field to end the inning. Baltimore then eliminated Chicago with a three-run outburst in the top of the 10th, advancing to the World Series for the first time since 1979. With one out in the 10th, Tito Landrum hit a 1-0 pitch into the left field upper deck, ending Burns' day. Then Salome Barojas in relief allowed three straight singles to Cal Ripken Jr., Eddie Murray and Gary Roenicke, the last of which scored a run. Benny Ayala's sacrifice fly off Juan Agosto capped the scoring at 3–0 Orioles. Game 4 was the last postseason game played at Comiskey Park.

Chicago scored one run in the final 31 innings of the series, hitting .211 as a team with no homers. Four of the team's starters, Harold Baines, Carlton Fisk, Vance Law and Greg Luzinski, hit below .200. Baltimore hit but .217 and had the same number of hits (28) as the White Sox did, but outscored them 19–3.

The 1983 ALCS was the first post-season series in the Orioles' history in which they lost the first game—in their 11 post-season series dating to 1966 the team had always won Game 1. Similarly the O's would lose Game 1 of the 1983 World Series before coming back to sweep the remaining four games.

This is the Orioles' most recent pennant to date.

== Composite box ==
1983 ALCS (3–1): Baltimore Orioles over Chicago White Sox

Team	1	2	3	4	5	6	7	8	9	10	R	H	E
Baltimore Orioles	3	2	0	1	2	2	0	1	5	3	19	28	1
Chicago White Sox	0	1	1	0	0	1	0	0	0	0	3	28	3
Total attendance: 195,748 Average attendance: 48,937

== Broadcasting ==
On television, NBC Sports broadcast the series in the United States, concurrent with its coverage of the NLCS. Local coverage of the series was also provided by the White Sox and Orioles' respective flagship stations: Then-independent WFLD-TV in Chicago and then-NBC affiliate WMAR-TV in Baltimore, with the latter station pre-empting NBC's network coverage in favor of its own.

The 1983 postseason marked the last time that local telecasts of League Championship Series games were allowed. In 1982, MLB recognized a problem with this due to the emergence of cable superstations such as WTBS in Atlanta and WGN-TV in Chicago. When TBS tried to petition for the right to do a "local" Braves broadcast of the 1982 NLCS, MLB got a Philadelphia federal court to ban them on the grounds that as a cable superstation, TBS couldn't have a nationwide telecast competing with ABC's.

== Aftermath ==
The Orioles would go on to win the World Series, beating a veteran Philadelphia Phillies ballclub in a competitive five games in the World Series. Despite a return from all-time franchise wins leading manager Earl Weaver in 1985–1986, the Orioles never seriously contended in the AL East again until 1989, and did not get back to the playoffs until 1996. By 1996, MLB had created a three-division format and wild-card (best non-division winning record), thus the Orioles did not win the AL East in 1996, but still qualified for the postseason via the wild card, and made it to the ALCS, only to lose to the eventual World Series champion New York Yankees in five games. As of 2025, Baltimore has yet to return to the World Series.

The 1983 White Sox success was also short-lived. The team did not win 90 games again until 1990 and did not make the playoffs until 1993. The 1990 season also the team's last playing at Comiskey Park. The White Sox success in 1983, coupled with their mediocrity in the seasons preceding and following it, ultimately made the 1983 season an anomaly.

Like Earl Weaver, La Russa would retire and later return to managing. Thirty-four years after being let go by the White Sox, La Russa was hired to be the team's manager again in 2020 at age 76. In the interim, La Russa won three World Series with Oakland in 1989 and the St. Louis Cardinals in 2006 and 2011. He was also inducted into the Baseball Hall of Fame in 2014, so his return made him the first manager in baseball history to manage a team after being enshrined in the Hall of Fame. He managed two seasons with the club, winning a division title in 2021 before losing the American League Division Series to the Houston Astros.
