= 1993 Major League Baseball postseason =

1993 Major League Baseball playoffs

Tournament details
- Dates: October 5–23, 1993
- Teams: 4

Final positions
- Champions: Toronto Blue Jays (2nd title)
- Runners-up: Philadelphia Phillies

Tournament statistics
- Games played: 18
- Attendance: 980,361 (54,465 per game)
- Best BA: Paul Molitor (TOR) (.447)
- Most HRs: Lenny Dykstra (PHI) (6)
- Most SBs: Roberto Alomar (TOR) (8)
- Most Ks (as pitcher): Curt Schilling (PHI) (28)

Awards
- MVP: Paul Molitor (TOR)

The 1993 Major League Baseball postseason was the playoff tournament of Major League Baseball for the 1993 season. The winners of each division advanced to the postseason and faced each other in a League Championship Series to determine the pennant winners that would face each other in the World Series. This was the last edition of the postseason to feature only two rounds, with only division champions qualifying. After the 1994–95 Major League Baseball strike, the playoffs were expanded to include a wild card team and a new League Division Series for the 1995 postseason.

In the American League, the Toronto Blue Jays made their fifth postseason appearance in the last nine years, and the Chicago White Sox made their first postseason appearance since 1983. This was Toronto's last postseason appearance until 2015.

In the National League, the Atlanta Braves made their third straight postseason appearance, and the Philadelphia Phillies also made their first postseason appearance since 1983. This was Philadelphia’s last postseason appearance until 2007.

This was the last edition of the postseason until 2008 to not feature the New York Yankees, who would start a streak of thirteen straight appearances the next season.

The playoffs began on October 5, 1993, and concluded on October 23, 1993, with the Blue Jays defeating the Phillies in six games in the 1993 World Series. The Blue Jays repeated as World Series champions, becoming the seventh franchise in MLB history to win back-to-back championships.

== Playoff seeds ==
American League Teams National League Teams

The following teams qualified for the postseason:

=== American League ===
- Toronto Blue Jays – 95–67, AL East champions
- Chicago White Sox – 94–68, AL West champions

=== National League ===
- Philadelphia Phillies – 97–65, NL East champions
- Atlanta Braves – 104–58, NL West champions

== Playoff bracket ==
League Championship Series (ALCS, NLCS)
East	Toronto	4
West	Chicago White Sox	2
East	Philadelphia	4
West	Atlanta	2

World Series
AL	Toronto	4
NL	Philadelphia	2

== American League Championship Series ==
=== Chicago White Sox vs. Toronto Blue Jays ===
Toronto won the series, 4–2.

Game	Date	Score	Location	Time	Attendance
1	October 5	Toronto Blue Jays – 7, Chicago White Sox – 3	Comiskey Park (II)	3:38	46,246
2	October 6	Toronto Blue Jays – 3, Chicago White Sox – 1	Comiskey Park (II)	3:00	46,101
3	October 8	Chicago White Sox – 6, Toronto Blue Jays – 1	SkyDome	2:56	51,783
4	October 9	Chicago White Sox – 7, Toronto Blue Jays – 4	SkyDome	3:30	51,889
5	October 10	Chicago White Sox – 3, Toronto Blue Jays – 5	SkyDome	3:09	51,375
6	October 12	Toronto Blue Jays – 6, Chicago White Sox – 3	Comiskey Park (II)	3:31	45,527

The Blue Jays defeated the White Sox in six games to return to the World Series for the second year in a row.

In Game 1, the White Sox led 3-2 after the fourth, but the Blue Jays put up five unanswered runs across the next three innings to win. In Game 2, Dave Stewart out-dueled Chicago's Alex Fernandez as the Jays won 3–1 to take a 2–0 series lead headed back home to Toronto. However, things didn't go quite the Jays' way just yet. Wilson Álvarez pitched a complete game for the White Sox as they won Game 3 to get on the board in the series. RBIs and home runs from Frank Thomas and Lance Johnson would carry the White Sox to victory in Game 4, evening the series. The Blue Jays would take Game 5 and the series lead back despite closer Duane Ward giving up a two-run home run to Robin Ventura in the top of the ninth. Game 5 would ultimately be Bo Jackson’s final postseason game in either the NFL or MLB. Stewart out-dueled Fernandez again in Game 6, and Ward helped seal a 6–2 Blue Jays victory to clinch the pennant.

The White Sox would return to the ALCS in 2005, and defeated the Los Angeles Angels of Anaheim in five games en route to a World Series title.

The Blue Jays would return to the ALCS in 2015, but lost to the eventual World Series champion Kansas City Royals in six games. They would eventually win the pennant again in 2025 over the Seattle Mariners in seven games after being eight outs away from elimination in Game 7, but they would come up short in the World Series. This was the last time a Toronto-based team won a conference championship in any of the four major North American leagues until the NBA’s Toronto Raptors won the Eastern Conference title in 2019, and the last time Canadian teams won conference championships in more than one of the four major leagues until the Blue Jays and the NHL’s Edmonton Oilers did so in 2025.

== National League Championship Series ==
=== Philadelphia Phillies vs. Atlanta Braves ===
Philadelphia won the series, 4–2.

Game	Date	Score	Location	Time	Attendance
1	October 6	Atlanta Braves – 3, Philadelphia Phillies – 4 (10)	Veterans Stadium	3:33	62,012
2	October 7	Atlanta Braves – 14, Philadelphia Phillies – 3	Veterans Stadium	3:14	62,436
3	October 9	Philadelphia Phillies – 4, Atlanta Braves – 9	Atlanta–Fulton County Stadium	2:44	52,032
4	October 10	Philadelphia Phillies – 2, Atlanta Braves – 1	Atlanta–Fulton County Stadium	3:33	52,032
5	October 11	Philadelphia Phillies – 4, Atlanta Braves – 3 (10)	Atlanta–Fulton County Stadium	3:21	52,032
6	October 13	Atlanta Braves – 3, Philadelphia Phillies – 6	Veterans Stadium	3:04	62,502

This was the first postseason meeting between the Braves and Phillies. The Phillies upset the two-time defending National League champion Braves in six games to return to the World Series for the first time since 1983.

In Game 1, the Phillies prevailed in extra innings as Kim Batiste drove in the winning run with an RBI double in the bottom of the tenth. Greg Maddux pitched seven solid innings as the Braves blew out the Phillies in Game 2 to even the series headed to Atlanta. Tom Glavine went another seven innings in Game 3 as the Braves blew out the Phillies again to take the series lead. Then, the Braves imploded. In Game 4, the Phillies evened the series as Danny Jackson out-dueled John Smoltz. Game 5 was another extra-inning contest that was won by the Phillies, as Lenny Dykstra hit a solo home run in the top of the tenth to put the Phillies ahead for good, taking a 3–2 series lead headed back to Philadelphia. Tommy Greene pitched seven strong innings and the Phillies’ offense chased Maddux from the mound in a 6–3 victory in Game 6 to clinch the pennant.

This would be the last time the Phillies won the pennant until 2008, where they defeated the Los Angeles Dodgers in five games en route to a World Series title.

The Braves returned to the NLCS the next season, and swept the Cincinnati Reds en route to a World Series title.

Both teams would meet again in the NLDS in 2022 and 2023, both of which were won by the Phillies, and the Wild Card round in 2026, which was won by the Braves.

== 1993 World Series ==
=== Toronto Blue Jays (AL) vs. Philadelphia Phillies (NL) ===
Toronto won the series, 4–2.

Game	Date	Score	Location	Time	Attendance
1	October 16	Philadelphia Phillies – 5, Toronto Blue Jays – 8	SkyDome	3:27	52,011
2	October 17	Philadelphia Phillies – 6, Toronto Blue Jays – 4	SkyDome	3:35	52,062
3	October 19	Toronto Blue Jays – 10, Philadelphia Phillies – 3	Veterans Stadium	3:16	62,689
4	October 20	Toronto Blue Jays – 15, Philadelphia Phillies – 14	Veterans Stadium	4:14	62,731
5	October 21	Toronto Blue Jays – 0, Philadelphia Phillies – 2	Veterans Stadium	2:53	62,706
6	October 23	Philadelphia Phillies – 6, Toronto Blue Jays – 8	SkyDome	3:27	52,195

The Blue Jays defeated the Phillies in six games to repeat as World Series champions.

Game 1 was a slugfest that the Blue Jays won. In Game 2, the Phillies evened the series as closer Mitch Williams helped fend off a late rally by the Jays. In Philadelphia, the series then went upside down for the hometown team. Pat Hentgen pitched six solid innings as the Blue Jays blew out the Phillies in Game 3 to regain the series lead. Game 4 was a massive back-and-forth slugfest between both teams, but the Blue Jays narrowly prevailed, 15–14, to take a 3–1 series lead. Game 4 had three new World Series records set, including the longest game (4:14), most total runs scored in a single game (29), and most runs scored by a losing team (14). In Game 5, Curt Schilling won his first postseason game as he pitched a five-hit complete-game shutout to send the series back to Toronto. Game 5 was the last postseason game ever played at Veterans Stadium. The Blue Jays would capture the title in the bottom of the ninth inning of Game 6 thanks to Joe Carter's come-from-behind walk-off three-run home run. The Blue Jays became the seventh franchise in MLB history to repeat as World Series champions.

Along with the Montreal Canadiens winning the 1993 Stanley Cup Final, 1993 became the first (and to date, only) year in which at least two championships of the four major North American sports leagues were won by Canadian teams. This would be the last championship of the four major North American sports leagues won by a team from Canada until the Toronto Raptors won the 2019 NBA Finals. The Blue Jays would return to the World Series in 2025, but they would narrowly fall to the Los Angeles Dodgers in seven games after being two outs away from the championship in Game 7. As of 2026, this is the most recent championship in any of the four major leagues to be won by a Canadian team at their home venue.

The Phillies would return to the World Series in 2008, and defeated the Tampa Bay Rays in five games to win their most recent championship.

== Broadcasting ==
This marked the final year of a four-year agreement with CBS to televise all postseason games nationally in the United States. MLB would then form The Baseball Network, a joint venture with ABC and NBC, to replace CBS in producing national telecasts of games.
