= 1996 Major League Baseball postseason =

1996 Major League Baseball playoffs

Tournament details
- Dates: October 1–26, 1996
- Teams: 8

Final positions
- Champions: New York Yankees (23rd title)
- Runners-up: Atlanta Braves

Tournament statistics
- Most HRs: Bernie Williams (NYY) (6)
- Most SBs: Kenny Lofton (CLE) (5)
- Best ERA: John Smoltz (ATL) (0.95)
- Most Ks (as pitcher): John Smoltz (ATL) (33)

Awards
- MVP: John Wetteland (NYY)

The 1996 Major League Baseball postseason was the playoff tournament of Major League Baseball for the 1996 season. The winners of the League Division Series would move on to the League Championship Series to determine the pennant winners that face each other in the World Series.

In the American League, the New York Yankees and Cleveland Indians returned for the second consecutive year, the Baltimore Orioles returned to the postseason for the first time since 1983, and the Texas Rangers made their first postseason appearance in franchise history.

In the National League, the San Diego Padres returned to the postseason for the first time since 1984, the St. Louis Cardinals made their first appearance since 1987, the Atlanta Braves made their fifth consecutive postseason appearance, and the Los Angeles Dodgers made their second straight appearance.

The postseason began on October 1, 1996, and ended on October 26, 1996, with the Yankees defeating the defending World Series champion Braves in six games to capture their first title since 1978. It was the Yankees' 23rd title in franchise history.

== Playoff seeds ==
American League Teams National League Teams

The following teams qualified for the postseason:

=== American League ===
- New York Yankees – 92–70, AL East champions
- Cleveland Indians – 99–62, AL Central champions
- Texas Rangers – 90–72, AL West champions
- Baltimore Orioles – 88–74

Home-field advantage priority order: Central, West, East

=== National League ===
- Atlanta Braves – 96–66, NL East champions
- St. Louis Cardinals – 88–74, NL Central champions
- San Diego Padres – 91–71, NL West champions
- Los Angeles Dodgers – 90–72

Home-field advantage priority order: East, West, Central

== Playoff bracket ==
Division Series (ALDS, NLDS)
E	NY Yankees	3
W	Texas	1
American League
WC	Baltimore	3
C	Cleveland	1
E	Atlanta	3
WC	Los Angeles	0
National League
W	San Diego	0
C	St. Louis	3

League Championship Series (ALCS, NLCS)
E	NY Yankees	4
WC	Baltimore	1
E	Atlanta	4
C	St. Louis	3

World Series
AL	NY Yankees	4
NL	Atlanta	2

== American League Division Series ==
=== Cleveland Indians vs. Baltimore Orioles ===
Baltimore won the series, 3–1.

Game	Date	Score	Location	Time	Attendance
1	October 1	Cleveland Indians – 4, Baltimore Orioles – 10	Oriole Park at Camden Yards	3:27	47,644
2	October 2	Cleveland Indians – 4, Baltimore Orioles – 7	Oriole Park at Camden Yards	3:27	48,970
3	October 4	Baltimore Orioles – 4, Cleveland Indians – 9	Jacobs Field	3:44	44,250
4	October 5	Baltimore Orioles – 4, Cleveland Indians – 3 (12)	Jacobs Field	4:41	44,280

This was the first postseason meeting between the Orioles and Indians. The Orioles knocked off the defending American League champion Indians in four games to advance to the ALCS for the first time since 1983.

The Orioles blew out the Indians in Game 1, capped off by a grand slam from Bobby Bonilla. In Game 2, the Indians rallied to tie the game in the top of the eighth, but the Orioles retook the lead for good in the bottom of the inning, capped off by an RBI from Roberto Alomar. When the series shifted to Cleveland, the Orioles held a 4-3 lead in the fourth inning and were hoping to sweep, but the Indians put up five unanswered runs afterward, capped off by a grand slam from Albert Belle. In Game 4, the Indians were on the verge of tying the series as they lead 3–2 in the top of the ninth with the Orioles down to their final out. However, Alomar hit an RBI single to send the game into extra innings. Alomar then won the series for the Orioles with a solo home run in the top of the twelfth. This was the first playoff series win by the Orioles since the 1983 World Series.

Both the Orioles and Indians would meet each other again in the ALCS the next year, which the Indians won in six games before falling in the World Series.

=== Texas Rangers vs. New York Yankees ===
New York won the series, 3–1.

Game	Date	Score	Location	Time	Attendance
1	October 1	Texas Rangers – 6, New York Yankees – 2	Yankee Stadium (I)	2:50	57,205
2	October 2	Texas Rangers – 4, New York Yankees – 5 (12)	Yankee Stadium (I)	4:25	57,156
3	October 4	New York Yankees – 3, Texas Rangers – 2	The Ballpark in Arlington	3:09	50,860
4	October 5	New York Yankees – 6, Texas Rangers – 4	The Ballpark in Arlington	3:57	50,066

This was the first postseason meeting between the Yankees and Rangers. The Yankees defeated the Rangers in four games to advance to the ALCS for the first time since 1981.

John Burkett pitched a complete game for the Rangers as they stole Game 1 in the Bronx. Game 1 was the only playoff game won by the Rangers until Game 1 of the ALDS in 2010. In Game 2, the Rangers lead going into the bottom of the eighth, but the Yankees slowly chipped away at their lead to tie the game and force extra innings. The Yankees evened the series in the bottom of the twelfth thanks to a sacrifice bunt from Charlie Hayes which scored Derek Jeter due to an error by Texas’ Dean Palmer. In Arlington for Game 3, the Rangers again held a late lead going into the ninth, but couldn’t hold it again as Bernie Williams tied the game with a sacrifice fly, and Mariano Duncan put the Yankees ahead for good with an RBI single. In Game 4, the Rangers quickly put up a 4–0 lead, but the Yankees scored six unanswered runs to close out the series. This was the first playoff series win by the Yankees since winning the American League pennant in 1981.

The Rangers and Yankees would meet again in the ALDS in 1998, 1999, and the ALCS in 2010, with the Yankees winning the former two and the Rangers winning the latter.

== National League Division Series ==
=== San Diego Padres vs. St. Louis Cardinals ===
St. Louis won the series, 3–0.

Game	Date	Score	Location	Time	Attendance
1	October 1	San Diego Padres – 1, St. Louis Cardinals – 3	Busch Stadium (II)	2:39	54,193
2	October 3	San Diego Padres – 4, St. Louis Cardinals – 5	Busch Stadium (II)	2:55	56,752
3	October 5	St. Louis Cardinals – 7, San Diego Padres – 5	Jack Murphy Stadium	3:32	53,899

This was the first postseason meeting between the Cardinals and Padres. The Cardinals swept the Padres to return to the NLCS for the first time since 1987.

Despite ending in a sweep, all three games were decided by two runs or less. The Cardinals won Game 1 thanks to an early three run home run from Gary Gaetti. In Game 2, the Padres rallied to tie the game thanks to an RBI ground out from Steve Finley, but the Cardinals ultimately prevailed thanks to an RBI ground out from Tom Pagnozzi, giving them a 2–0 series lead headed to San Diego. Game 3 was an offensive slugfest between both teams, which was won by the Cardinals as they completed the sweep. Game 3 was Fernando Valenzuela’s final postseason game.

The Cardinals and Padres would meet again in the NLDS in 2005 and 2006, as well as the Wild Card series in 2020. The Cardinals won the former two meetings, and the Padres won the latter.

=== Atlanta Braves vs. Los Angeles Dodgers ===
Atlanta won the series, 3–0.

Game	Date	Score	Location	Time	Attendance
1	October 2	Atlanta Braves – 2, Los Angeles Dodgers – 1 (10)	Dodger Stadium	3:08	47,428
2	October 3	Atlanta Braves – 3, Los Angeles Dodgers – 2	Dodger Stadium	2:08	51,916
3	October 5	Los Angeles Dodgers – 2, Atlanta Braves – 5	Atlanta–Fulton County Stadium	3:19	52,529

This was the first postseason meeting between the Braves and Dodgers. The Braves swept the Dodgers to advance to the NLCS for the fifth consecutive year.

Game 1 was a pitchers’ duel that ended up going into extra innings tied at one. The tie was later broken by Atlanta’s Javy López, who hit a solo home run in the top of the tenth to win the game for the Braves. Greg Maddux outdueled Ismael Valdéz in another pitchers’ duel as the Braves took Game 2 to go up 2–0 in the series headed back home. In Game 3, the Braves’ offense chased Hideo Nomo from the mound as they won 5–2 to complete the sweep.

Both teams would meet in the postseason again four more times - in the NLDS in 2013 and 2018 (both won by the Dodgers), the NLCS in 2020 (won by the Dodgers), and 2021 (won by the Braves), and the NLDS again in 2026 (won by the Dodgers).

== American League Championship Series ==
=== New York Yankees vs. Baltimore Orioles ===
New York won the series, 4–1.

Game	Date	Score	Location	Time	Attendance
1	October 9	Baltimore Orioles – 4, New York Yankees – 5 (11)	Yankee Stadium (I)	4:23	56,495
2	October 10	Baltimore Orioles – 5, New York Yankees – 3	Yankee Stadium (I)	4:13	58,432
3	October 11	New York Yankees – 5, Baltimore Orioles – 2	Oriole Park at Camden Yards	2:50	48,635
4	October 12	New York Yankees – 8, Baltimore Orioles – 4	Oriole Park at Camden Yards	3:45	48,974
5	October 13	New York Yankees – 6, Baltimore Orioles – 4	Oriole Park at Camden Yards	2:57	48,718

This was the first postseason meeting between the Yankees and Orioles. The Yankees defeated the Orioles in five games to advance to the World Series for the first time since 1981.

Game 1 of the series became famous for the "Jeffrey Maier incident" - in the eighth inning of Game 1, rookie Derek Jeter hit a fly ball to deep right field off Armando Benítez. Right fielder Tony Tarasco backed up to the wall, but 12-year-old Yankees fan Jeffrey Maier reached over the fence and brought the ball into the stands and out of the field of play before Tarasco could attempt to catch the ball for a possible out. Tarasco immediately pointed above and protested that it was fan interference, but right field umpire Rich Garcia controversially ruled it a home run and his call was upheld by the other members of the umpiring crew. The Yankees would go on to win Game 1 in extra innings thanks to a walk-off solo homer from Bernie Williams in the bottom of the eleventh. In Game 2, the Yankees jumped out to an early lead, but a pair of two-run home runs from Todd Zeile and Rafael Palmeiro put the Orioles in the lead for good as they evened the series headed to Baltimore. In Game 3, the Orioles took an early lead thanks to another two-run blast from Zeile, but the Yankees scored five unanswered runs, capped off by a two-run home run from Cecil Fielder to win and retake the series lead. In Game 4, the Yankees jumped into the lead early and held it to take a 3–1 series lead. In Game 5, the Yankees jumped out to a big lead early thanks to home runs from Fielder, Jim Leyritz and Darryl Strawberry, and they held it to win the pennant.

This was the first of three consecutive losses in the ALCS for the Orioles - the next year, they would lose to the Cleveland Indians in six games, and in 2014 they were swept by the Kansas City Royals.

This was the first of seven pennants won by the Yankees over the span of thirteen years. The Yankees would win their next pennant two years later over the Cleveland Indians in six games en route to starting a World Series three-peat.

The Yankees and Orioles would meet again in the ALDS in 2012, which the Yankees won in five games.

== National League Championship Series ==
=== Atlanta Braves vs. St. Louis Cardinals ===
Atlanta won the series, 4–3.

Game	Date	Score	Location	Time	Attendance
1	October 9	St. Louis Cardinals – 2, Atlanta Braves – 4	Atlanta–Fulton County Stadium	2:35	48,686
2	October 10	St. Louis Cardinals – 8, Atlanta Braves – 3	Atlanta–Fulton County Stadium	2:53	52,067
3	October 12	Atlanta Braves – 2, St. Louis Cardinals – 3	Busch Stadium (II)	2:46	56,769
4	October 13	Atlanta Braves – 3, St. Louis Cardinals – 4	Busch Stadium (II)	3:17	56,764
5	October 14	Atlanta Braves – 14, St. Louis Cardinals – 0	Busch Stadium (II)	2:57	56,782
6	October 16	St. Louis Cardinals – 1, Atlanta Braves – 3	Atlanta–Fulton County Stadium	2:41	52,067
7	October 17	St. Louis Cardinals – 0, Atlanta Braves – 15	Atlanta–Fulton County Stadium	2:25	52,067

This was a rematch of the 1982 NLCS, which the Cardinals won in a sweep en route to winning the World Series. The Braves overcame a 3–1 series deficit to defeat the Cardinals in seven games, returning to the World Series for the fourth time in six years (in the process denying a rematch of the 1964 World Series between the Yankees and Cardinals).

John Smoltz pitched eight solid innings as the Braves took Game 1. The Cardinals evened the series with a blowout win in Game 2, capped off by a grand slam from Gary Gaetti. In St. Louis for Game 3, Ron Gant led the Cardinals to victory with a pair of home runs. In Game 4, the Braves had a 3–0 lead after six and a half innings, but the Cardinals scored four unanswered runs to take a commanding 3–1 series lead. However, things quickly turned ugly for the Cardinals. In Game 5, Smoltz pitched seven innings of shutout ball as the Braves embarrassed the Cardinals 14–0 in front of their home fans to send the series back to Atlanta. In Game 6, Greg Maddux outdueled Alan Benes in a pitchers’ duel to force a seventh game. The Braves clinched the pennant in Game 7 in a 15–0 rout to become the first team to ever come back from a 3–1 series deficit in the NLCS. The Braves’ 14-0 and 15-0 victories in games five and seven respectively were the two largest in LCS history, surpassing the eleven run margin of victory set by the Los Angeles Dodgers in Game 4 of the 1974 NLCS. Game 7 was the final game of legendary Cardinals shortstop Ozzie Smith's career; he received a standing ovation from the Braves crowd before flying out to the right-field foul territory in his last at-bat.

The Cardinals would return to the NLCS in 2000, but they fell to the New York Mets in five games. They would win their next pennant in 2004 over the Houston Astros in seven games after being ten outs away from elimination in Game 7, but came up short in the World Series.

The Braves would return to the NLCS the next year, but were upset by the eventual World Series champion Florida Marlins in six games. They would win their next pennant in 1999 over the New York Mets in six games before falling in the World Series.

The Braves and Cardinals would meet again three more times in the postseason — during the NLDS in 2000, the Wild Card Game in 2012, and the NLDS again in 2019 — with the Cardinals winning all three match-ups.

== 1996 World Series ==
=== New York Yankees (AL) vs. Atlanta Braves (NL) ===
New York won the series, 4–2.

Game	Date	Score	Location	Time	Attendance
1	October 20	Atlanta Braves – 12, New York Yankees – 1	Yankee Stadium	3:10	56,365
2	October 21	Atlanta Braves – 4, New York Yankees – 0	Yankee Stadium	2:44	56,340
3	October 22	New York Yankees – 5, Atlanta Braves – 2	Atlanta–Fulton County Stadium	3:22	51,843
4	October 23	New York Yankees – 8, Atlanta Braves – 6 (10)	Atlanta–Fulton County Stadium	4:17	51,881
5	October 24	New York Yankees – 1, Atlanta Braves – 0	Atlanta–Fulton County Stadium	2:54	51,881
6	October 26	Atlanta Braves – 2, New York Yankees – 3	Yankee Stadium	2:52	56,375

This was the third World Series matchup between the Braves and Yankees. They previously met in 1957 and 1958 when the Braves were still based out of Milwaukee, with the Braves winning the former and the Yankees winning the latter after trailing 3–1 in the series. The Yankees overcame a two-games-to-none series deficit to upset the defending World Series champion Braves in six games, winning their first title since 1978.

At first, it appeared as if the Yankees were no match for the defending champion Braves. In the first World Series games played in the Bronx in 15 years, John Smoltz pitched six solid innings as the Braves blew out the Yankees in Game 1. Greg Maddux pitched eight innings of shutout baseball in Game 2 as the Braves took a 2–0 series lead headed to Atlanta. There, the Yankees responded. Bernie Williams helped lead the Yankees to victory in Game 3 to get on the board in the series. Game 4 was an offensive slugfest which the Yankees won in extra innings after putting up eight unanswered runs to even the series at two, capped off by a RBI sacrifice fly from Charlie Hayes in the top of the tenth. In Game 5, Andy Pettitte pitched eight shutout innings as the Yankees won 1-0 to take a 3–2 series lead headed back to the Bronx. Game 5 was the last game ever played at Atlanta–Fulton County Stadium. In Game 6, the Yankees jumped out to a 3–0 lead early, and while the Braves cut their lead to one in the top of the ninth, the Yankees held on to secure the title.

The Yankees’ eighteen-year drought between championships was the longest for the franchise, and was their longest drought since going fifteen years without winning a title from 1962 to 1977. This victory marked the start of a dynasty for the Yankees. They would return to the World Series two years later, where they swept the San Diego Padres to start a three-peat from 1998 to 2000.

The Braves would return to the World Series three years later only to be defeated by the Yankees again in a sweep, as they became the second victim of the Yankees’ three-peat from 1998 to 2000. They wouldn’t win their next championship until 2021, where they defeated the Houston Astros in six games.

== Broadcasting ==
This was the first season under a five-year rights agreement with ESPN, Fox, and NBC, marking the first time that playoff games aired nationally on U.S. cable television. Division Series games aired across ESPN, ESPN2, Fox, and NBC so that each game could be available nationally instead of regionally during the previous postseason's The Baseball Network broadcasts. Then in even-numbered years starting in 1996, NBC televised the American League Championship Series, and Fox aired both the National League Championship Series and the World Series. In odd-numbered years starting in 1997, Fox had the American League Championship Series, and NBC showed both the National League Championship Series and the World Series.
