= Jimmy Freeman =

American baseball player (born 1951)

- Pitcher
- Born: June 29, 1951 (age 74); Carlsbad, New Mexico, U.S.
- Batted: Left Threw: Left

MLB debut
- September 1, 1972, for the Atlanta Braves

Last MLB appearance
- July 31, 1973, for the Atlanta Braves

MLB statistics
- Win–loss record: 2–4
- Earned run average: 6.87
- Strikeouts: 38
- Stats at Baseball Reference

Teams
- Atlanta Braves (1972–1973)

Jimmy Lee Freeman (born June 29, 1951) is an American former Major League Baseball pitcher who made two brief appearances with the Atlanta Braves in the early 1970s. He batted and threw left-handed.

Freeman was born in Carlsbad, New Mexico, and was drafted by the Braves in the sixth round of the 1969 Major League Baseball draft out of Nathan Hale High School in Tulsa, Oklahoma. After compiling a 26–26 record and 4.25 earned run average in four seasons in the Braves' farm system, he received a call up to the Braves in September 1972. Though he gave up five earned runs, he pitched a complete game and won his major league debut against the Philadelphia Phillies.

He was far more impressive in his second start against the Los Angeles Dodgers, in which he gave up five hits in eight plus innings, and left the game with a 4–1 lead and runners on first and second. Ron Schueler earned the save to give Freeman the win. As it turned out, this would be his last career win as he would go 0–2 with two no decisions in his final four starts of the season.

Freeman came up in June 1973 as a starting pitcher, however after pitching poorly in both of his first two starts, he was moved into the bullpen. He earned his only career save against the New York Mets on July 16. After one final start on July 31, in which he gave up five earned runs in 3.1 innings of work, he was returned to the Richmond Braves.

Freeman appeared in just nine games at Richmond in 1974. At the start of the 1975 season, he was dealt to the Baltimore Orioles for Earl Williams and cash. He was dealt along with Ken Holtzman, Doyle Alexander, Elrod Hendricks and Grant Jackson from the Orioles to the New York Yankees for Rick Dempsey, Scott McGregor, Tippy Martinez, Rudy May and Dave Pagan at the trade deadline on June 15, 1976. Yankees general manager Gabe Paul said of Freeman, "He was the parsley on the potatoes."
