= Dave Pagan =

Canadian baseball player (born 1949)

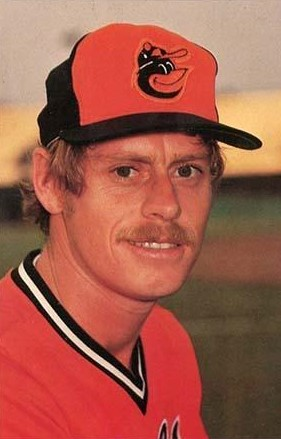
- Pitcher
- Born: September 15, 1949 (age 77); Nipawin, Saskatchewan, Canada
- Batted: Right Threw: Right

MLB debut
- July 1, 1973, for the New York Yankees

Last MLB appearance
- September 27, 1977, for the Pittsburgh Pirates

MLB statistics
- Win–loss record: 4–9
- Earned run average: 4.96
- Strikeouts: 147
- Stats at Baseball Reference

Teams
- New York Yankees (1973–1976); Baltimore Orioles (1976); Seattle Mariners (1977); Pittsburgh Pirates (1977)

David Percy Pagan (/ˈpeɪɡən/ PAY-gən; born September 15, 1949) is a Canadian former professional baseball pitcher. He played all or part of five seasons in Major League Baseball from 1973 until 1977, and was a member of the Seattle Mariners' 1977 inaugural season roster.

== Career ==
Pagan joined the New York Yankees organization in 1970. After three seasons in their farm system, he received his first call up to the majors in 1973, making the start in the second game of a July 1 double header with the Cleveland Indians. After escaping a jam in the first inning, Pagan was pulled in the second with the bases loaded and nobody out, and one run already in. He was far more effective in a second appearance made in relief on July 7 before returning to the minors. After compiling an 8–5 record and 2.03 earned run average between the West Haven Yankees and Syracuse Chiefs, he rejoined the Yankees that September.

Pagan split the next two seasons between the Yankees and Syracuse. He made the opening day roster for the first time in 1976 as a member of the Yankees' bullpen, but made just two starts with the club. He was acquired along with Rick Dempsey, Scott McGregor, Tippy Martinez and Rudy May by the Baltimore Orioles from the Yankees for Ken Holtzman, Doyle Alexander, Elrod Hendricks, Grant Jackson and Jimmy Freeman in a blockbuster at the trade deadline on June 15, 1976.

After going 1–4 with a 5.98 ERA the rest of the way for Baltimore, he was selected by the Seattle Mariners in the 1976 Major League Baseball expansion draft. He was traded to the Pittsburgh Pirates for a player to be named later on July 27, 1977, and made one appearance with the club that September against the New York Mets. After two more seasons playing minor league ball in the Pirates organization, he retired.
