= Julio Cruz (baseball) =

American baseball player (1954–2022)

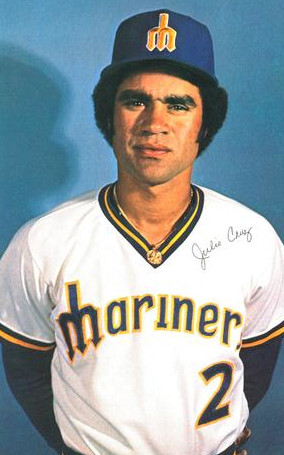
- Cruz in 1978
- Second baseman
- Born: December 2, 1954; Brooklyn, New York, U.S.
- Died: February 22, 2022 (aged 67); Seattle, Washington, U.S.
- Batted: Switch Threw: Right

MLB debut
- July 4, 1977, for the Seattle Mariners

Last MLB appearance
- August 31, 1986, for the Chicago White Sox

MLB statistics
- Batting average: .237
- Home runs: 23
- Runs batted in: 279
- Stolen bases: 343
- Stats at Baseball Reference

Teams
- Seattle Mariners (1977–1983); Chicago White Sox (1983–1986)

Julio Luis Cruz (December 2, 1954 – February 22, 2022) was an American professional baseball second baseman for the Seattle Mariners and Chicago White Sox of Major League Baseball from 1977 to 1986.

== Career ==
Cruz attended Redlands High School in Southern California, and earned all-league honors as a basketball point guard for Redlands. Cruz often said that he played basketball only to maintain his fitness, agility and speed for the baseball season.

Although a lifetime .237 hitter with little power, Cruz had excellent speed. Six years in a row with the Seattle Mariners, from 1978 through 1983, he stole over 40 bases each season and was the team's all-time leader in that statistic leading to his nickname "the Cruzer". His franchise record of 290 was surpassed by Ichiro Suzuki, whose two stolen bases in a game against the Padres on May 18, 2008, gave him a total of 292. Cruz was traded to the Chicago White Sox on June 15, 1983, for fellow second baseman Tony Bernazard.. The White Sox went on finish the season with 99 wins and a divisional pennant. In what was his only postseason play in his career, Cruz went 4-of-12 (.333) and had two stolen bases in the 1983 American League Championship Series, which they lost to the Baltimore Orioles.

Cruz was inducted into the Hispanic Heritage Baseball Museum Hall of Fame on September 15, 2004, in a pregame on field ceremony at T-Mobile Park, in Seattle. He was a broadcaster for the Mariners.

== Personal life and death ==
Cruz died on February 22, 2022, at the age of 67 from prostate cancer.
