= Mike Boddicker =

American baseball player (born 1957)

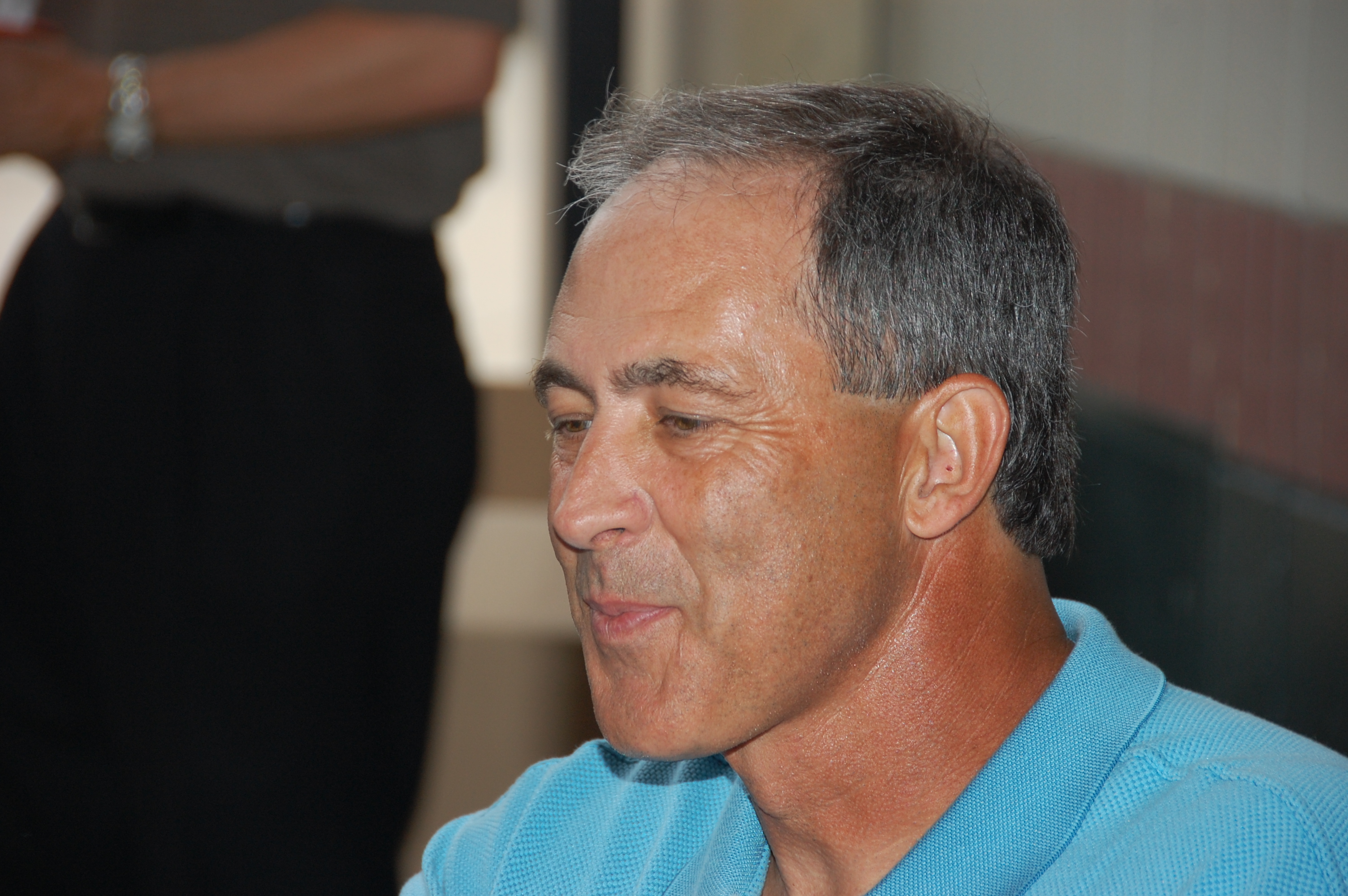
- Pitcher
- Born: August 23, 1957 (age 69); Cedar Rapids, Iowa, U.S.
- Batted: Right Threw: Right

MLB debut
- October 4, 1980, for the Baltimore Orioles

Last MLB appearance
- June 13, 1993, for the Milwaukee Brewers

MLB statistics
- Win–loss record: 134–116
- Earned run average: 3.80
- Strikeouts: 1,330
- Stats at Baseball Reference

Teams
- Baltimore Orioles (1980–1988); Boston Red Sox (1988–1990); Kansas City Royals (1991–1992); Milwaukee Brewers (1993)

Career highlights and awards
- All-Star (1984); World Series champion (1983); ALCS MVP (1983); Gold Glove Award (1990); AL wins leader (1984); AL ERA leader (1984); Baltimore Orioles Hall of Fame

Michael James Boddicker (born August 23, 1957) is an American former professional baseball right-handed pitcher. He played in Major League Baseball (MLB) for the Baltimore Orioles (1980–1988), Boston Red Sox (1988–1990), Kansas City Royals (1991–1992), and Milwaukee Brewers (1993). He was the ALCS MVP in 1983 and was an American League All-Star in 1984.

== Early years ==
Boddicker was born in Cedar Rapids, Iowa, on August 23, 1957. His ancestors (Johan & Elisabeth (Jacobi) Boddicker) emigrated in 1861 from the village of Brilon, Province of Westphalia, which was situated in current-day Germany, and were among the original settlers of Norway, Iowa, where he was raised. He was the youngest of five children to Harold and Dolly. His father, who was commonly known as Bus, operated a travelling hammermill for grain milling before becoming a custodian at the local elementary school. He is a distant cousin of the musician Michael Boddicker.

He was drafted by the Montreal Expos in 1975, but decided to attend the University of Iowa. He was a First-team All-Big Ten pitcher in 1978 and third-team All-Big Ten as an infielder in 1976. In 1978, he led the NCAA with an average 11.5 strikeouts per game. He held school records with six career shutouts and 0.79 ERA in a season. He led the team in innings and strikeouts in 1978 and 1979 and led the team in batting average in 1978 (.350) and doubles in 1978 (9) and 1976 (9). He finished his career with 189 strikeouts, ranking in the top 10 in school history.

== Baseball career ==
Boddicker's pitching repertoire, once called "Little League slop" by Rod Carew, featured off-speed pitches and deception to compensate for a lack of power. He was able to throw from three different arm angles. He had a fastball that never came close to reaching 90 miles per hour. The one pitch that made him famous was the fosh, which he called "a glorified changeup." Another one he used with success was the slurve. Tony Phillips once commented, "What I noticed about him is that he lets you get yourself out. I find myself sometimes actually jumping at his pitches, being overanxious because he doesn't throw very fast, and I wind up popping the ball up."

Boddicker had a win–loss record of 134–116 with a 3.80 ERA during his career. In his rookie season, 1983, he went 16–8 with a 2.77 ERA and led the majors with five shutouts. Perhaps his best season was 1984, when he went 20–11 with a 2.79 ERA (leading the American League in both wins and ERA). He also won the Gold Glove Award in 1990.

Boddicker had a notable performance in the 1983 postseason. With his team down 1–0 in both the ALCS and World Series, Boddicker pitched his team out of the hole by winning Game 2 of the ALCS 4–0 against the Chicago White Sox (complete game shutout) and Game 2 of the World Series 4–1 against the Philadelphia Phillies en route to a world championship. After going 0–8 with a 5.83 ERA to begin the 1988 campaign, Boddicker rebounded with a 6–4 record and a 2.95 ERA in his last 13 starts with the Orioles. On a team that lost its first 21 games of the season and was never in postseason contention, he was traded to the Boston Red Sox for Brady Anderson and Curt Schilling on July 29, 1988, two days prior to the non-waivers trade deadline. Contending for the American League East title, the Red Sox outbid the Minnesota Twins and Oakland Athletics to land him. Boddicker went 7–3 down the stretch for the Sox, helping them win the AL East crown that year. He went 15–11 in 1989 and in 1990 went 17–8 with a 3.36 ERA while helping the Red Sox win another division title.

After signing with the Royals, he finished 12–12 with a 4.08 ERA in 1991, his last full season (30 games). After his contract was purchased by the Brewers, he pitched 54 innings for them in 1993, his final year. He finished 3–5 with a 5.67 ERA that year.

== See also ==
- List of Major League Baseball annual ERA leaders
- List of Major League Baseball annual wins leaders
- List of Major League Baseball career hit batsmen leaders
