= Rick Dempsey =

American baseball player (born 1949)

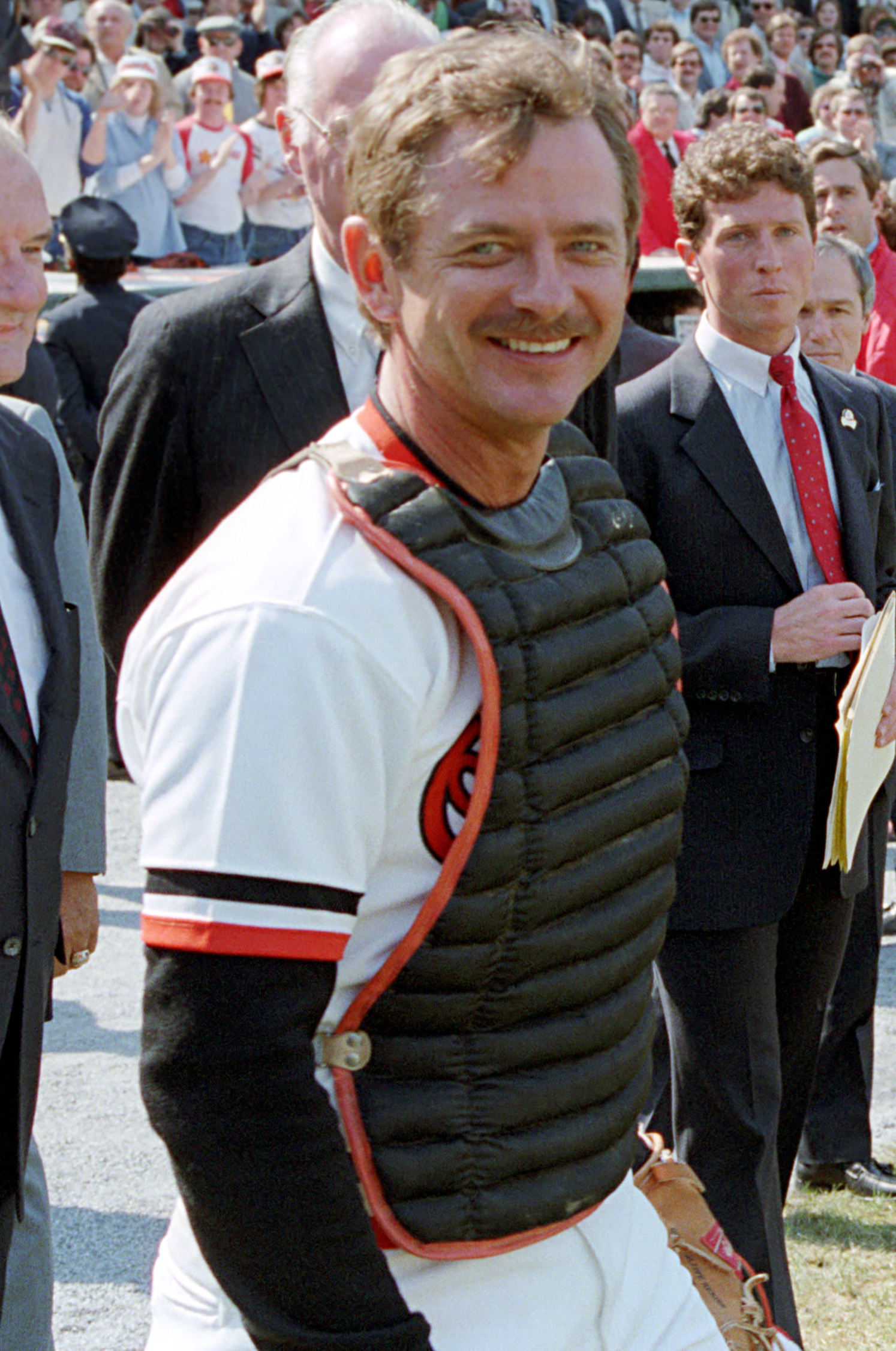
- Dempsey with the Baltimore Orioles in 1984
- Catcher
- Born: September 13, 1949 (age 76); Fayetteville, Tennessee, U.S.
- Batted: Right Threw: Right

MLB debut
- September 23, 1969, for the Minnesota Twins

Last MLB appearance
- September 27, 1992, for the Baltimore Orioles

MLB statistics
- Batting average: .233
- Home runs: 96
- Runs batted in: 471
- Stats at Baseball Reference

Teams
- Minnesota Twins (1969–1972); New York Yankees (1973–1976); Baltimore Orioles (1976–1986); Cleveland Indians (1987); Los Angeles Dodgers (1988–1990); Milwaukee Brewers (1991); Baltimore Orioles (1992)

Career highlights and awards
- 2× World Series champion (1983, 1988); World Series MVP (1983); Baltimore Orioles Hall of Fame

John Rikard Dempsey (born September 13, 1949) is an American former professional baseball player. He played for 24 seasons as a catcher in Major League Baseball from 1969 to 1992, most prominently for the Baltimore Orioles where he played for 10 years and was a member of the 1983 World Series winning team. Dempsey was known for being one of the best defensive catchers of his era. In 1997, he was inducted into the Baltimore Orioles Hall of Fame.

== Early career ==
Dempsey was selected by the Minnesota Twins in the 15th round of the 1967 Major League Baseball draft out of Crespi Carmelite High School. He spent two seasons in the minor leagues.

== Major league career ==
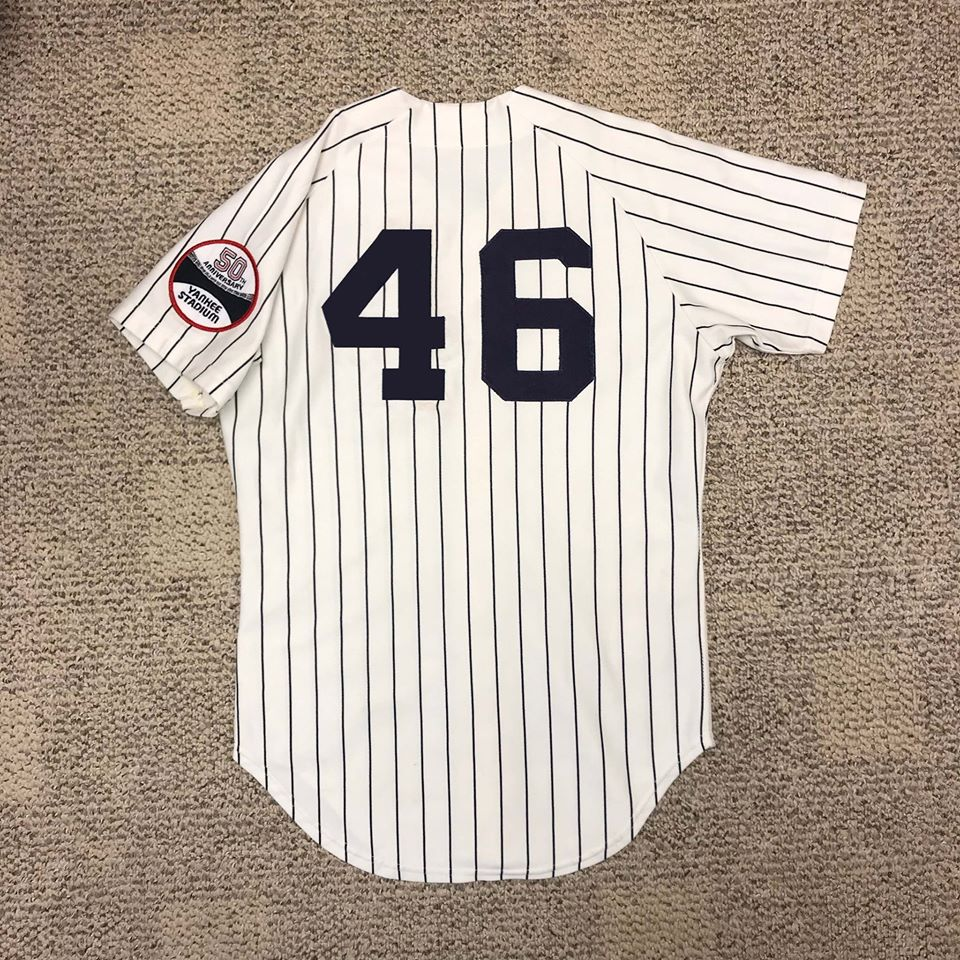
Game-worn home jersey for Dempsey from 1973

Dempsey made his major league debut late in the 1969 season for the division winning Twins managed by Billy Martin, however he didn't qualify for the postseason roster. Dempsey spent a few more seasons shuttling between the Twins and their minor league teams, before being traded to the New York Yankees for Danny Walton on October 31, 1972.

During his tenure with the Yankees, he served as a reserve catcher to Thurman Munson, and received tutoring from Yankees coach and former catching standout Jim Hegan. He was involved in a fight with teammate Bill Sudakis in the lobby of The Pfister Hotel while the ballclub was checking in on September 29, 1974. It was the culmination of an unpleasant conversation between the two players on a one-hour flight which was delayed for three hours at Cleveland Hopkins International Airport. The Yankees had swept a four-game series from the Indians and were still in contention for the American League East title with two games remaining in the regular season.

After three and a half seasons with the Yankees, the Baltimore Orioles acquired Dempsey along with Scott McGregor, Tippy Martinez, Rudy May, and Dave Pagan for Ken Holtzman, Doyle Alexander, Elrod Hendricks, Grant Jackson, and Jimmy Freeman at the trade deadline on 15 June 1976. He, McGregor and Martinez became part of a nucleus that enabled the Orioles to continue as perennial contenders for the next decade.

For the next ten and a half seasons, Dempsey was the Orioles' starting catcher. He became known for his exceptional ability to handle pitching staffs, his strong throwing arm, and for his agility behind home plate. In 1979, the Orioles defeated the California Angels in the 1979 American League Championship Series to reach the World Series. In the 1979 World Series, the Orioles won three of the first four games against the Pittsburgh Pirates and seemed to be on the verge of winning the championship, when the Pirates, led by Willie Stargell, rebounded to win the final three games. It was one of Dempsey's greatest disappointments of his playing career.

In 1983, the Orioles won the American League Eastern Division pennant, then defeated the Chicago White Sox in the 1983 American League Championship Series, before winning the 1983 World Series against the Philadelphia Phillies. Dempsey posted a .385 batting average along with a .923 slugging percentage in the five-game series, and won the World Series Most Valuable Player Award, one of six catchers to have won the award.

In 1987, Dempsey became a free agent and signed a contract to play for the Cleveland Indians. After only one season with the Indians, he became a free agent once again and signed with the Los Angeles Dodgers, where he would be a member of another World Series-winning team in 1988, this time as a backup catcher to Mike Scioscia. When Scioscia was injured during Game 4 of the World Series, Dempsey took over behind the plate for the remainder of the Series, collecting an RBI double in Game 5. While playing for the Dodgers in 1990, he became involved in a brawl with Phillies' center fielder Lenny Dykstra, who took exception to Dempsey's "buttering up" the home plate umpire. Anticipating something happening when Dysktra came closer to him, Dempsey promptly punched him with his catcher's glove. He was suspended for one game. After three seasons with the Dodgers, he played one season with the Milwaukee Brewers, before returning to the Baltimore Orioles for his final season in 1992.

His sense of humor during his playing career was renowned, and he was famous for his "rain delay theatre" performances, in which he emerged from the dugout in stockinged feet onto the tarpaulin covering the infield during a rain delay and pantomimed hitting an inside-the-park home run, climaxed by his sliding into home plate on his belly on the wet tarp, all to the raucous delight of the soggy fans. He sometimes did this while wearing a pair of underpants over his uniform, making fun of teammate Jim Palmer's famous advertisements for Jockey brand briefs.

== Career statistics ==
In a 24-year career, Dempsey played in 1,765 games, accumulating 1,093 hits in 4,692 at bats for a .233 career batting average along with 96 home runs and 471 runs batted in. He ended his career with a .988 fielding percentage. Dempsey led American League catchers twice in fielding percentage, twice in baserunners caught stealing and once in assists. He played more games as a catcher than any other player in Orioles history (1230). During his career, Dempsey caught ten different 20-game winning pitchers. He was a durable player, only going on the disabled list twice in his career. Dempsey fared well offensively in postseason play. In 14 World Series and 11 playoff games, he batted .303 (20-for-66) with 11 runs, 11 doubles, 1 home run, 7 RBIs, 1 stolen base and 7 bases on balls.

While he was a light-hitting player, Dempsey's lengthy major league career was due in part to his excellent defensive skills, despite the fact that he never won a Gold Glove. He usually did not make a large contribution offensively. During his season with the Brewers, Dempsey made two relief pitching appearances, giving up three hits and one run in two innings pitched. Dempsey also won a Little League World Series in 1963 with the team from Canoga Park-Woodland Hills, California. He is the uncle of former major league catcher Gregg Zaun. Dempsey is one of only 31 players to play in four different calendar decades.

== Coaching and broadcasting career ==
After his playing career ended, Dempsey became a minor league manager in the Los Angeles Dodgers organization, winning the 1994 Pacific Coast League championship with the Triple-A Albuquerque Dukes. He then joined the New York Mets organisation, managing the Norfolk Tides in 1997 and 1998. Dempsey served as first base coach for the Orioles for several seasons, starting in 2002. He eventually shifted to the third base coaching position in the 2005 season after bench coach Sam Perlozzo was promoted to interim manager. He assumed the bullpen coach position in the 2006 season, replacing Elrod Hendricks who the team intended to reassign to another position in the organization before his death. Later in 2006, he became the first base coach again when the team reassigned Dave Cash.

Dempsey has been a candidate for managerial openings with the Orioles in the past, as recently as 2003 when the Orioles interviewed him for the spot that eventually went to Lee Mazzilli. He was mentioned again as a possible candidate for the Baltimore manager's job in 2010, after the firing of Dave Trembley.

Dempsey also served as an Oriole color commentator in 2000 and began another stint in 2007, as the studio analyst for O's Xtra on MASN, the cable channel that carries Orioles games. In addition, he serves as a game analyst for occasional games on MASN. In 1985, Dick Enberg was in Toronto for Games 1 and 7 of the 1985 ALCS on NBC. Enberg hosted the pregame show alongside Dempsey (who was still active with Baltimore at the time). In 1995, Dempsey worked as a field reporter for ABC's coverage of the All-Star Game from Texas. Dempsey was among those laid off by MASN in 2021.

== See also ==
- List of Major League Baseball players who played in four decades

Sporting positions
Preceded by Tom Beyers	Bakersfield Dodgers Manager; 1993	Succeeded by John Shelby
Preceded by Bill Russell	Albuquerque Dukes Manager; 1994–1995	Succeeded by Phil Regan
Preceded by Bruce Benedict	Norfolk Tides Manager; 1997–1998	Succeeded by John Gibbons
Preceded by Glenn Hoffman	Los Angeles Dodgers Bullpen Coach; 1999–2000	Succeeded by Jim Lett
Preceded by Eddie Murray	Baltimore Orioles First Base Coach; 2002–2005	Succeeded by Dave Cash
Preceded by Tom Trebelhorn	Baltimore Orioles Third Base Coach; 2005	Succeeded by Tom Trebelhorn
Preceded by Elrod Hendricks	Baltimore Orioles Bullpen Coach; 2006	Succeeded by Larry McCall
Preceded by Dave Cash	Baltimore Orioles First Base Coach; 2006	Succeeded by Sam Mejías
