= Eddie Murray =

American baseball player (born 1956)

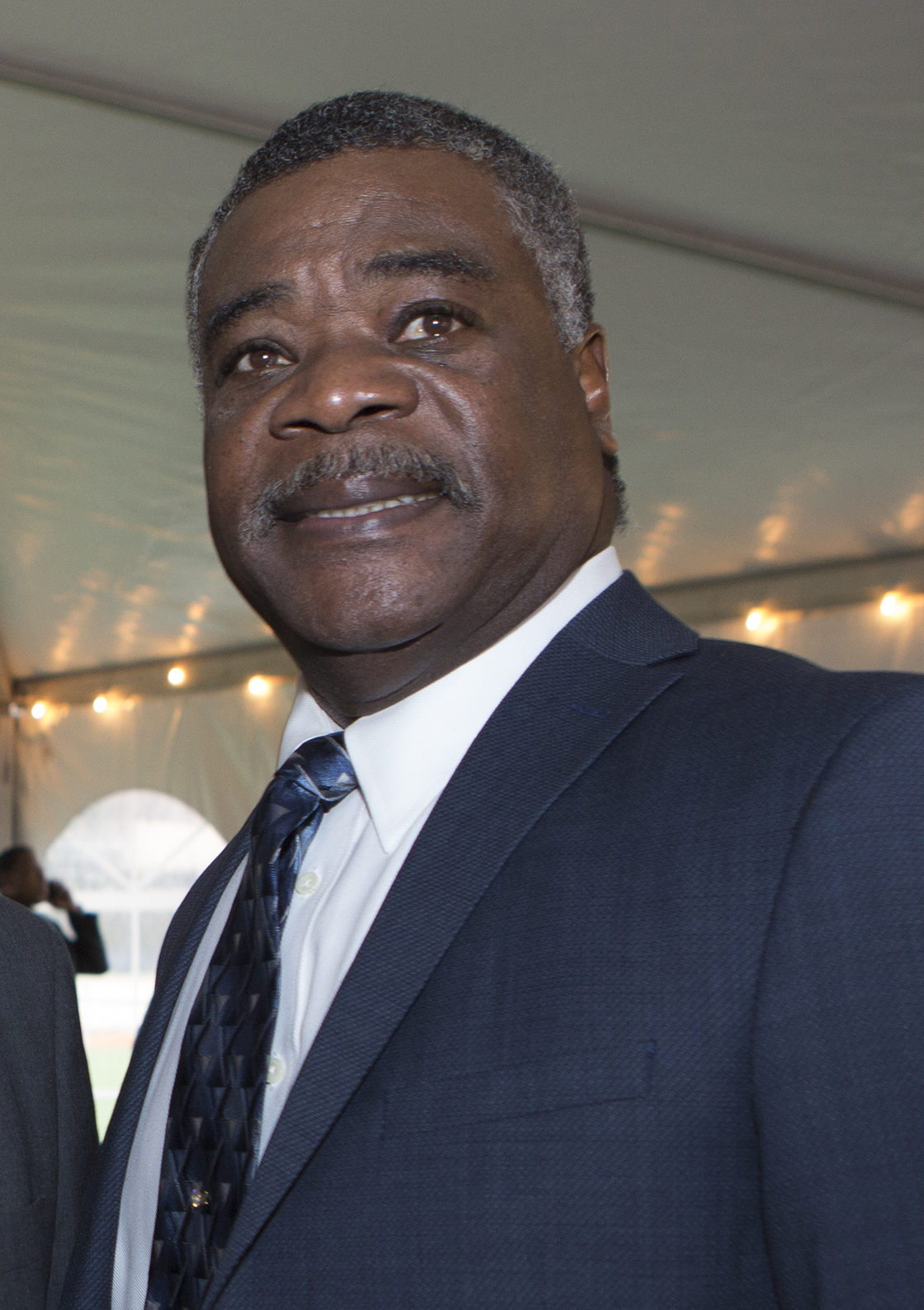
- Murray in 2017
- First baseman / Designated hitter
- Born: February 24, 1956 (age 70); Los Angeles, California, U.S.
- Batted: Switch Threw: Right

MLB debut
- April 7, 1977, for the Baltimore Orioles

Last MLB appearance
- September 20, 1997, for the Los Angeles Dodgers

MLB statistics
- Batting average: .287
- Hits: 3,255
- Home runs: 504
- Runs batted in: 1,917
- Stats at Baseball Reference

Teams
- As player: Baltimore Orioles (1977–1988); Los Angeles Dodgers (1989–1991); New York Mets (1992–1993); Cleveland Indians (1994–1996); Baltimore Orioles (1996); Anaheim Angels (1997); Los Angeles Dodgers (1997); As coach: Baltimore Orioles (1998–2001); Cleveland Indians (2002–2005); Los Angeles Dodgers (2006–2007)

Career highlights and awards
- 8× All-Star (1978, 1981–1986, 1991); World Series champion (1983); AL Rookie of the Year (1977); 3× Gold Glove Award (1982–1984); 3× Silver Slugger Award (1983, 1984, 1990); AL home run leader (1981); AL RBI leader (1981); Baltimore Orioles No. 33 retired; Baltimore Orioles Hall of Fame

Member of the National

Baseball Hall of Fame
- Induction: 2003
- Vote: 85.3% (first ballot)

Eddie Clarence Murray (born February 24, 1956), nicknamed "Steady Eddie", is an American former professional Major League Baseball (MLB) first baseman, designated hitter, and coach. He spent most of his MLB career with the Baltimore Orioles, and ranks fourth in team history in games played and hits. Though Murray never won a Most Valuable Player (MVP) Award, he finished in the top ten in MVP voting eight times. Murray has more RBIs than any other MLB switch-hitter; his 996 runs batted in in the 1980s were more than any other player.

Murray began his playing career with the Orioles in 1977 after being drafted in 1973. In his rookie season, he batted .283 in 160 games with 27 home runs and 173 hits as he was awarded the American League Rookie of the Year. The following season saw him named to the All-Star team for the first time ever as he batted .285 with 27 home runs in 161 games. Murray went to the World Series twice with the Orioles in 1979 and 1983; in the decisive Game 5 of the latter, Murray hit two home runs in the 5–0 victory for his first and only championship. In his first twelve seasons, Murray had eleven 20-HR seasons (leading the league in 1981 with 22) and topped 100 RBIs in five times in a six season span while winning two Silver Slugger Awards. A stormy relationship with the front office led to him being traded in the 1988 offseason to the Los Angeles Dodgers. He played three seasons and batted .278 with them while winning his third (and final) Silver Slugger Award in 1990.

He then went to the New York Mets in 1992 and served as a bright spot for teams that finished in the division cellar. He then joined the Cleveland Indians in free agency for 1994, where he would serve primarily as their designated hitter. He had 17 home runs in the strike-shortened season before belting 21 for the 1995 team that saw him collect his 3,000th career hit. In the first postseason run for the team in 41 years, Murray batted .232 with three home runs and a walk off hit in the 1995 World Series, although the team lost in six games. The following year saw him get traded to the Orioles midway through his final season of 20+ home runs, and it was with Baltimore that he collected his 500th career home run. He became a free agent after the year and played the 1997 season with the Anaheim Angels and the Dodgers, hitting three home runs in 55 total games. After his playing career, Murray coached for the Orioles, Indians and Dodgers.

Murray is one of just seven MLB players to have 3,000 hits and 500 home runs and one of just two switchhitters in each club. He was elected to the Baseball Hall of Fame in 2003 in his first year of eligibility. In the New Bill James Historical Baseball Abstract (2001), Murray is described as the fifth-best first baseman in major league history. He was 77th on the list of Baseball's 100 Greatest Players by The Sporting News (1998).

== Early life ==
Murray was the eighth child of 12 and still has nine living siblings: five sisters and four brothers. He has often quipped that as a child he did not have to go far for a pick-up baseball game. The games were quite fierce and his older brothers never let him win. Murray played Little League baseball under coach Clifford Prelow, an ex-Dodger minor leaguer. (In his Hall of Fame induction speech, Murray thanked Prelow for teaching him not just the game of baseball, but love for the game as well.) Prelow remembers that young Murray was a well behaved player. Murray attended Locke High School in Los Angeles, where he batted .500 as a senior and was a teammate of Ozzie Smith.

== Playing career ==
=== Baltimore Orioles (1977–1988) ===
With the Orioles from 1977 until 1988, Murray averaged 28 home runs and 99 RBI, making him a perennial candidate for the MVP award, twice finishing second in the voting. Murray's close friendship with teammate Cal Ripken Jr. was highly publicized in Baltimore at the time. Ripken credited Murray with teaching him his work ethic.

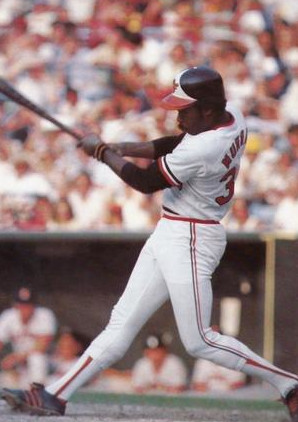
Murray at bat in 1977

Murray was selected by the Baltimore Orioles in the third round of the 1973 amateur draft and had several successful seasons in the minor leagues. He debuted in the majors on April 7, 1977, Opening Day, and played in 160 games in his first season. In 160 games, he hit for .283 with 27 home runs, 29 doubles, and 88 RBIs, while striking out 104 times. This was the only season in which he struck out over 100 times. He won the American League Rookie of the Year award despite Mitchell Page posting a better batting average and OPS. He was Baltimore's primary designated hitter, as veteran Lee May held the first base job despite being an inferior batter. In his next season, Murray was named to his first All-Star Game, though he did not play in the game, and finished eighth in the MVP balloting. He played in 161 games, swapping positions with May, and bettered his offense, hitting for .285 along with 27 home runs, 32 doubles, and 95 RBIs. In the 1979 season, Murray hit .295 along with 25 home runs, 30 doubles and 99 RBI. He finished 11th in the MVP balloting despite being left off the All-Star Game roster. He participated in his first postseason. In the 1979 American League Championship Series (ALCS), he hit 5-for-12, leading Baltimore with 1 home run, 5 RBI, and 5 walks as they beat the California Angels in four games. (His strong performance came the year before the American League began naming a MVP of the League Championship Series.)

Murray's performance nosedived in the 1979 World Series. In the 1st two games, he got off to a great start, hitting 4-for-5 with a home run and 2 RBIs. However, in the 8th inning of game two, he slid into 2nd base and hurt his wrist. Catcher Ed Ott noticed a change in Murray's batting stance, and relayed that to manager Chuck Tanner. For the remainder of the series, Murray went 0-for-21 with 4 strikeouts, concluding with a bases loaded at-bat in the eighth inning of game 7. Manager Tanner ordered relief pitcher Kent Tekulve to pitch to Murray, by "don't give him anything good to hit, but don't walk him". Murray grounded out, and the Orioles lost to the Pittsburgh Pirates in seven games..

In the 1980 season, he hit .300 (a career first), with 32 home runs, 36 doubles, and 116 RBIs in 158 games. The only games he missed were due to a potentially serious on-field injury. On July 13, George Brett hit a ground ball that took a bat hop and struck Murray in the eye. Brett ended up on second base and Murray was taken to the hospital and received stitches. After missing 4 games, he returned to the lineup, playing every other game. He hit better after the eye injury, batting .316 with 18 home runs in 76 games. He finished sixth in the MVP balloting that year.

While only playing in 99 games due to the player's strike, in 1981 Murray hit .294, tying for the lead with 22 home runs and leading the AL with 78 RBIs. He was named to the All-Star Game, hitting two groundouts in his first All-Star Game appearance, and finished 5th in the MVP balloting.

In a full season in 1982, Murray hit .316 with 32 home runs, 30 doubles, and 110 RBIs in 151 games. He returned to the All-Star Game, won his first Gold Glove Award, and finishing 2nd in the MVP balloting, his highest finish. The Orioles lost on the final day of the regular season to the Milwaukee Brewers, dashing their chance to play in the postseason.

Murray's 1983 performance was not much different, but his team fared better. He hit .306/.393/.538 with a career-high 33 home runs, 30 doubles, and 111 RBIs in 156 games. He improved his awards haul, being named to the All-Star Game, winning his a second consecutive Golden Glove, and his first Silver Slugger Award. He also repeated a second-place finish in MVP voting, trailing teammate Cal Ripken Jr. In the 1983 ALCS against the Chicago White Sox, he hit 4-for-15 with one home run and three RBIs as the Orioles advanced in four games to the World Series. In the Fall Classic, he batted 5-for-20. He hit two home runs in the series clinching 5–0 Game 5 victory over the Philadelphia Phillies. This was Murray's only world championship and his last postseason appearance for 12 years.

In 1984, Murray played in all 162 games for the only time in his career, hitting for .306 with 29 home runs, 26 doubles, and 110 RBIs. He walked a career-high 107 times. He continued compiling awards, being named to a fourth consecutive All-Star Game, winning a third straight Gold Glove and second straight Silver Slugger, and finishing 4th in the MVP balloting. The following year, he hit for .297 with 31 home runs, a career-best 37 doubles, and 124 RBIs in 156 games. He was named to his fifth straight All-Star Game while finishing 5th in the MVP balloting. The 1986 season, his tenth with the Orioles, was a slight regression, though he hit .305 with 17 home runs, 25 doubles and 84 RBIs in 137 games. He was named to the All-Star Game once again. This was his last selection until 1991. The following year, he hit for .277 with 30 home runs, 28 doubles, and 91 RBIs in 160 games. This was his first season with more strikeouts than walks (78 to 75) since 1983. In the 1988 season, he hit for .284 with 27 doubles and 91 RBIs in 161 games.

Murray's relationship with Orioles management began to sour during spring training in 1986 when he accused team officials of pressuring him to return prematurely from an ankle injury. His request to be traded in late-August of that year was fueled by criticism from team owner Edward Bennett Williams who questioned his off-season work habits, defense, and lack of extra base hits.

Murray was traded to the Los Angeles Dodgers for Ken Howell, Brian Holton, and Juan Bell on December 4, 1988. The Orioles paid $1 million of the $8 million Murray was owed for the final three years of his contract. Baltimore Sun sports columnist Mike Preston called Murray's departure from Baltimore in 1988 "one of the lowest moments in this city's sports history, as sad as the Colts leaving for Indianapolis, and as embarrassing as Colts officials allowing quarterback John Unitas to wear a San Diego Chargers uniform."

=== Los Angeles Dodgers (1989–1991) ===
In his first season with the Dodgers, Murray hit for a career-low .247 with 20 home runs, 29 doubles and 88 RBIs in 160 games. He rebounded in 1990, with a .330 average, 26 home runs, 22 doubles and 95 RBIs in 155 games. He had 64 strikeouts (his lowest since 49 in 1986) while having 87 walks, the most since he had 84 in 1985. He received the Silver Slugger Award for the third and final time while finishing 5th in the MVP balloting. He narrowly lost the NL batting title to Willie McGee. McGee was traded from the St. Louis Cardinals to the Oakland Athletics on August 29 but had enough plate appearances to qualify for the batting title, hitting .335 to Murray's .330. McGee hit .274 with the A's, resulting in a season average .324, which meant that Murray led the major leagues in batting average despite not winning the NL batting title.

In 1991, his final season with the Dodgers, Murray batted .260 with 19 home runs, 23 doubles, and 96 RBIs in 153 games. Despite his dip in performance, he was named to the All-Star Game, the final selection of his career. On October 29, 1991, he was granted free agency.

=== New York Mets (1992–1993) ===
On November 27, 1991, Murray signed a two-year, $7.5 million contract with the New York Mets. Murray was one of several acquisitions the Mets made, including Bobby Bonilla, Willie Randolph, and Bret Saberhagen, to try to regain their winning ways. However, in Murray's two years with the team they finished with 90 and 103 losses, respectively. Murray hit his 400th career home run on May 3, 1992 against Marvin Freeman of the Atlanta Braves. He hit .261 with 16 home runs, 37 doubles and 93 RBIs in 156 games for 1992. In the following year, he hit .285 with a team-high 100 RBIs (his first 100 RBI season since 1985), 27 home runs (second on the team to Bonilla), and 28 doubles in 154 games. Murray was one of three Mets to hit 20 or more home runs that year, with Bonilla hitting 34 and Jeff Kent hitting 21. This was the last time in his career that Murray hit the 100 RBI mark.

On November 1, 1993, he elected free agency.

=== Cleveland Indians (1994–1996) ===
Murray signed as a free agent by the Cleveland Indians on December 2, 1993. He signed a one-year, $3 million contract with a second year option. In the 1994 season, he played in 108 games and had a .254 batting average, 17 home runs and 76 RBIs before the season was cut short due to the player's strike. The following year, he played in 113 games with a .323 batting average, 21 home runs, and 82 RBIs. Murray reached the 3,000-hit plateau on June 30, 1995, at the Metrodome with a single to right field off Minnesota Twins pitcher Mike Trombley. In his return to the postseason, he hit Murray hit 5-for-13 with one home run and 3 RBIs as Cleveland swept the Boston Red Sox in the American League Division Series. In the ALCS, he hit 6-for-24 with one home run and 3 RBIs as the Indians beat the Seattle Mariners to advance to the World Series. In that series, he hit 2-for-19. One of his hits was a walk-off single in the bottom of the 11th inning of Game 3 off of Alejandro Peña to score Álvaro Espinoza. He had two other RBIs along with a home run in Game 2 that scored two runs. However, the Indians lost to the Atlanta Braves in six games.

Murray re-signed with the Indians for $2 million in December 1995. He began the 1996 season with Cleveland, batting .262 with 12 home runs in 88 games.

=== Last seasons (1996–1997) ===
Murray was traded back to Baltimore on July 21, 1996 for pitcher Kent Mercker. Murray played in 64 games for the Orioles, hitting for .257, 34 RBIs, 10 home runs and 59 hits. On September 6, he hit his 500th career home run off Felipe Lira. The home run came exactly one year after Ripken broke Lou Gehrig's streak of 2,130 consecutive games played. Having reached the 3,000-hit plateau in 1995, Murray became the third player with 3,000 hits and 500 home runs, preceded by Willie Mays and Hank Aaron. Rafael Palmeiro, Alex Rodriguez, Albert Pujols, and Miguel Cabrera have since reached those milestones.

Murray participated in the Orioles' playoff run, as the team advanced to the ALCS against the Yankees after having beat his old team Indians in the ALDS. In nine postseason games, he went 10-for-30 while hitting one home run.

Murray signed as a free agent with the Anaheim Angels on December 18, 1996. His last MLB home run was with the Angels, off Bob Tewksbury in the second inning in a 4–3 loss on May 30. Murray was released by the Angels on August 14.

On August 20, he was signed by the Dodgers. In nine total games with the Dodgers, he had a .286 batting average, 3 RBIs and 2 hits.

He retired after the 1997 season with 504 home runs. As of 2025, Mickey Mantle is the only switch-hitter who hit more home runs (536). Murray hit a home run from both sides of the plate in 11 games; he retired tied with Chili Davis for first place in this category. Both sluggers were since passed by Mark Teixeira and Nick Swisher, who hit such home runs in 14 games, and Carlos Beltrán, with 13 such games. Murray had a hit in 2,062 games, making him one of seventeen players with at least 2,000 games with one hit.

== Coaching career ==
After playing 21 major-league seasons. Murray became a coach, first with the Baltimore Orioles, serving as bench coach in 1998 and 1999 and as first-base coach in 2000 and 2001.

Murray then served as the hitting coach for the Cleveland Indians from 2002 to 2005. He was with the Indians when inducted into the Hall of Fame.

Murray accepted the position of hitting coach with the Los Angeles Dodgers in January 2006. On June 14, 2007, Murray was fired. Bill Mueller was named as interim replacement.

== Outside baseball ==
In the 1980s, Murray made a donation to the Baltimore City Parks and Recreation Department which led to the establishment of the Carrie Murray Nature Center, named after Murray's late mother. In 2008, Murray released a charity wine called Eddie Murray 504 Cabernet, a nod to his 504 career home runs, with all of his proceeds donated to the Baltimore Community Foundation.

On August 17, 2012, the Securities and Exchange Commission (SEC) charged Murray with insider trading. The SEC alleged, in a civil claim, that Murray had "made approximately $235,314 in illegal profits after Illinois-based Abbott Laboratories Inc. publicly announced its plan to purchase Advanced Medical Optics through a tender offer." Specifically, the SEC alleged that Murray had received a "tip" about the impending purchase offer before the offer was publicly announced, bought stock in Advanced Medical Optics because of the tip, and then sold the stock for the profits after the stock increased in value after Abbott Laboratories' plans were publicly announced. According to the SEC, Murray received the tip from former Baltimore Orioles teammate Doug DeCinces, with whom he remained close friends after their playing careers ended. One year earlier, DeCinces had agreed to pay $2.5 million to settle the SEC's civil insider trading charges against him in the same case. Murray agreed to settle the SEC's civil charges by paying a total of $358,151, without admitting or denying any wrongdoing.

== Legacy ==
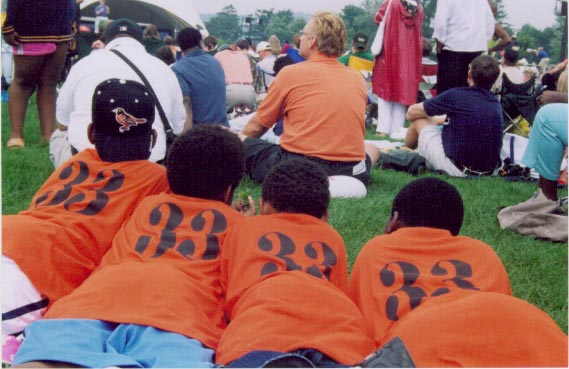
4 of the 300 inner city kids who came for #33's induction

In 1998, he ranked number 77 on The Sporting News list of Baseball's 100 Greatest Players, and was nominated as a finalist for the Major League Baseball All-Century Team.

On July 27, 2003, Murray, along with Gary Carter, was inducted into Major League Baseball's Hall of Fame. More than 30,000 people heard Murray talk about how hard it was to get to the Hall of Fame. He said that he was never about one person, but about the team. He thanked the "sea of black and orange" in the crowd and then pointed to the kids farthest in the back; (more than 300 inner-city little leaguers had come from Baltimore's Northwood Baseball League) and told them that one day "they would be here too."

Murray was named the fifth best first baseman in major league history in the New Bill James Historical Abstract (2010).

A bronze statue of Eddie Murray's left-handed-hitting stance was unveiled at Oriole Park at Camden Yards on August 11, 2012.

Union Craft Brewery in Baltimore makes "Steady Eddie," a wheat IPA named after Murray.

== Career stats – regular season ==
G	AB	R	H	2B	3B	HR	RBI	SB	CS	BB	SO	BA	OBP	SLG	TB	FLD%
3,026	11,336	1,627	3,255	560	35	504	1,917	110	43	1,333	1,516	.287	.359	.476	5,397	.993

== Accomplishments ==
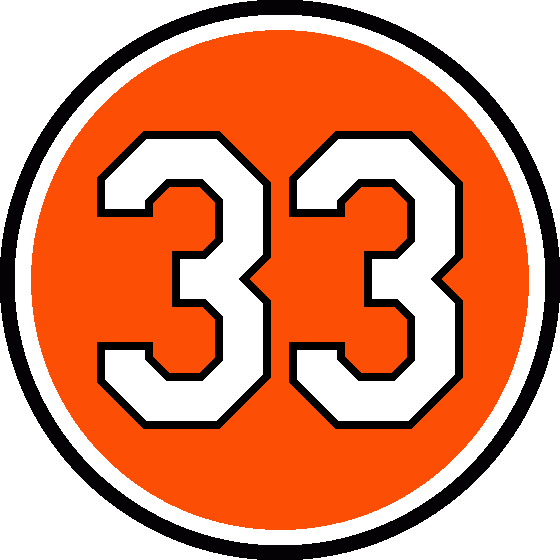
Eddie Murray's number 33 was retired by the Baltimore Orioles in 1998.

- 8-time All-Star (1978, 1981–86, 1991)
- Finished second in American League MVP voting (1982, 1983)
- Finished fourth in American League MVP voting (1984)
- Finished fifth in American League MVP voting (1981, 1985)
- Finished fifth in National League MVP voting (1990)
- Finished sixth in American League MVP voting (1980)
- Finished eighth in American League MVP voting (1978)
- Most RBI (1,917) among switch-hitters all-time
- Most career sacrifice flies (128) in MLB
- Most career assists by a first baseman (1,865)
- One of seven players to have both 3,000 career hits and 500 home runs, along with others are Hank Aaron, Willie Mays, Alex Rodriguez, Albert Pujols, Rafael Palmeiro, and Miguel Cabrera.
- Fourth all-time with 19 grand slams, behind Alex Rodriguez, Lou Gehrig, and Manny Ramírez.
- Career batting average with the bases loaded is .399 with 299 RBI and a .739 slugging percentage (in 302 plate appearances)
- Hit home runs from both sides of the plate in the same game 11 times, since surpassed by Mark Teixeira and Nick Swisher.
- Hit 3 home runs in a game three times (1979, 1980, 1985).
- 12th in career intentional walks (222).
- Baltimore Orioles:
  - Ranks second in home runs (343).
  - Ranks fourth in hits (2,080).
  - Ranks fourth in games played (1,884).
  - Ranks first in intentional walks (135).

== See also ==
- List of MLB home run records
- List of MLB doubles records
- 500 home run club
- List of MLB career home run leaders
- 3,000-hit club
- List of MLB career hits leaders
- List of MLB career doubles leaders
- List of MLB career runs scored leaders
- List of MLB career runs batted in leaders
- List of MLB annual runs batted in leaders
- List of MLB annual home run leaders

Sporting positions
Preceded by Andy Etchebarren	Baltimore Orioles Bench Coach; 1998–1999	Succeeded by Jeff Newman
Preceded by Marv Foley	Baltimore Orioles First Base Coach; 2000–2001	Succeeded by Rick Dempsey
Preceded by Clarence Jones	Cleveland Indians Hitting Coach; 2002–2005	Succeeded by Derek Shelton
Preceded by Tim Wallach	Los Angeles Dodgers Hitting Coach; 2006–2007	Succeeded by Bill Mueller
