= Scott McGregor (left-handed pitcher) =

American baseball player (born 1954)

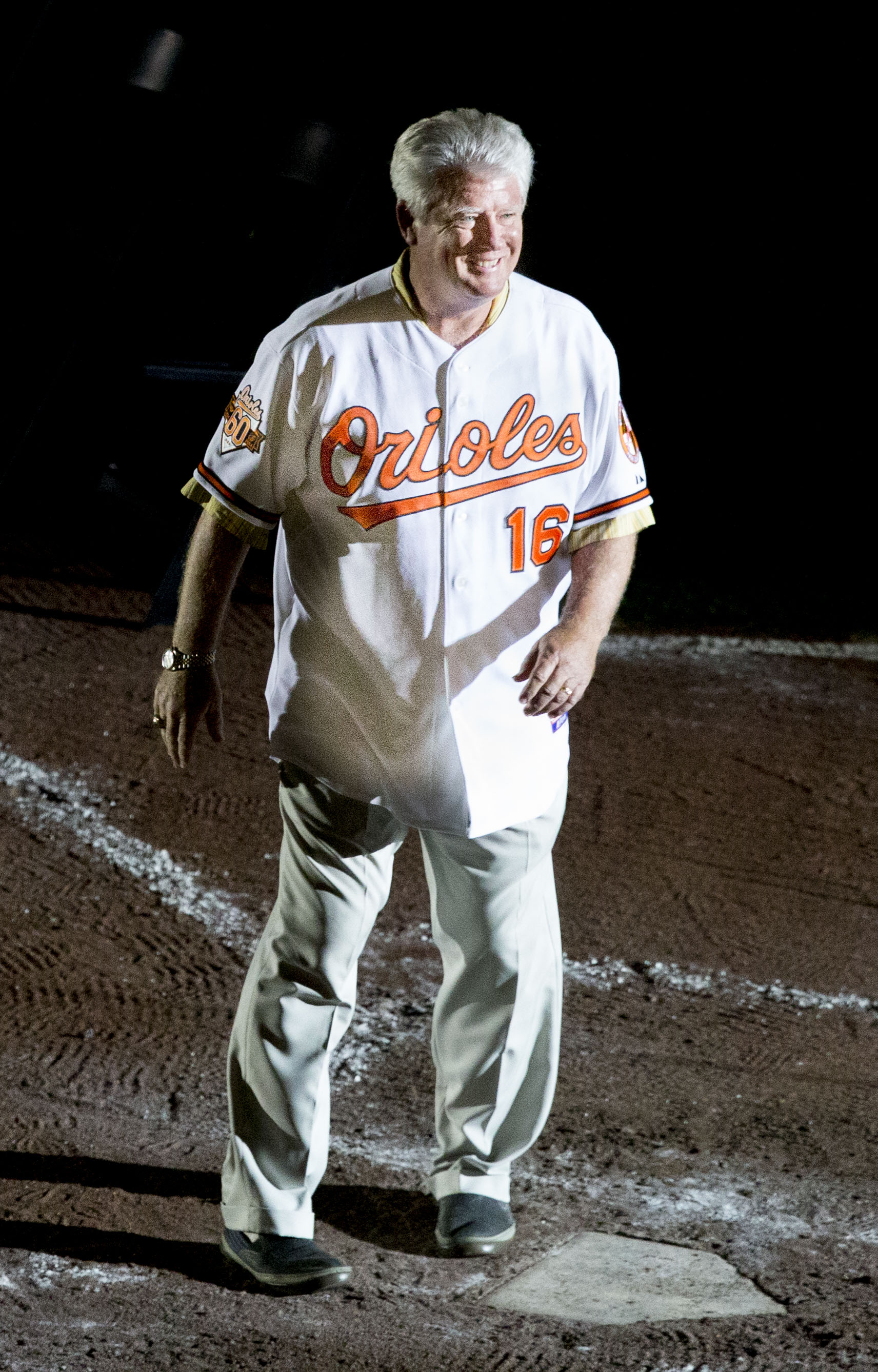
- McGregor in 2014
- Pitcher
- Born: January 18, 1954 (age 72); Inglewood, California, U.S.
- Batted: Switch Threw: Left

MLB debut
- September 19, 1976, for the Baltimore Orioles

Last MLB appearance
- April 27, 1988, for the Baltimore Orioles

MLB statistics
- Win–loss record: 138–108
- Earned run average: 3.99
- Strikeouts: 904
- Stats at Baseball Reference

Teams
- Baltimore Orioles (1976–1988)

Career highlights and awards
- All-Star (1981); World Series champion (1983); Baltimore Orioles Hall of Fame

Scott Houston McGregor (born January 18, 1954) is an American former professional baseball player and coach, who played his entire career in Major League Baseball as a left-handed pitcher for the Baltimore Orioles from 1976 to 1988.

McGregor was an integral member of the 1983 World Series Champion Baltimore Orioles team, pitching a complete game shutout to clinch the series victory.

Known for constantly changing speeds of his pitches, McGregor was a 20-game winner in 1980 and was named an American League (AL) All-Star in 1981.

After his playing career, he became a youth pastor before returning to serve as a major league coach. He was most recently the pitching coach for the Baltimore Orioles.

In 1990, McGregor was inducted into the Baltimore Orioles Hall of Fame.

== Baseball career ==
Born and raised in Southern California, McGregor played baseball at El Segundo High School with Baseball Hall of Fame member George Brett, who was a year ahead. He was 51–5 with a 0.39 earned run average (ERA) with the Eagles.

He was the 14th overall selection in the first round of the 1972 Major League Baseball draft by the New York Yankees.

McGregor was acquired along with Rick Dempsey, Tippy Martinez, Rudy May and Dave Pagan by the Orioles from the Yankees for Ken Holtzman, Doyle Alexander, Elrod Hendricks, Grant Jackson and Jimmy Freeman at the trade deadline on 15 June 1976. He, Dempsey and Martinez became part of a nucleus that enabled the Orioles to continue as perennial contenders for the next decade. He was selected to the American League All-Star team in 1981. He won 20 games in 1980. "The kid can pitch, that's all I can say," praised Hall of Fame manager Earl Weaver after McGregor threw a shutout on June 24 of that year.

McGregor was solid in two postseasons with the Orioles in 1979 and 1983. McGregor sent the Orioles to the World Series by clinching the 1979 ALCS with a Game 4 shutout of the California Angels. He pitched a complete-game victory in Pittsburgh in Game 3 of the World Series. Despite taking the loss in Game 7, McGregor yielded two runs in 8 innings to Willie Stargell and the eventual champion Pirates.

In the 1983 postseason, McGregor allowed only two runs in the openers of the ALCS and World Series, but lost both games by scores of 2–1 to the White Sox and Phillies, respectively. However, in Game 5, he shut out the Phillies in a complete game to end the series, four games to one. He remained a starting pitcher on the Orioles for the next five seasons, and made his final appearance on April 27, 1988.

McGregor was a better than average fielding pitcher in his major league career. In 356 pitching appearances covering 2,140.2 innings, he committed only nine errors in 445 total chances for a .980 fielding percentage, which was 24 points higher than the league average at his position.

After his baseball career ended, McGregor worked as a youth pastor and for five years headed a church in Towson, Maryland.

In 2002, McGregor returned to baseball as a pitching coach in Class A ball, and began working his way up. He was named interim Orioles bullpen coach on August 16, 2013, succeeding Bill Castro who was promoted to pitching coach after Rick Adair took a leave of absence for personal reasons. He did not return in 2014.

== See also ==
- List of Major League Baseball players who spent their entire career with one franchise

== Sources ==
Preceded by Bill Castro	Baltimore Orioles bullpen coach (interim); 2013	Succeeded by Dom Chiti
