= 1983 World Series =

80th edition of Major League Baseball's championship series

Team (Wins)	Managers	Season
Baltimore Orioles (4)	Joe Altobelli	98–64, .605, GA: 6
Philadelphia Phillies (1)	Paul Owens	90–72, .556, GA: 6
- Dates: October 11–16
- Venue(s): Memorial Stadium (Baltimore); Veterans Stadium (Philadelphia)
- MVP: Rick Dempsey (Baltimore)
- Umpires: Marty Springstead (AL), Ed Vargo (NL), Al Clark (AL), Frank Pulli (NL), Steve Palermo (AL), Dutch Rennert (NL)
- Hall of Famers: Orioles: Eddie Murray; Jim Palmer; Cal Ripken Jr. Phillies: Steve Carlton; Joe Morgan; Tony Pérez; Mike Schmidt

Broadcast
- Television: ABC
- TV announcers: Al Michaels, Howard Cosell, and Earl Weaver
- Radio: CBS; WFBR (BAL); WCAU (PHI)
- Radio announcers: Jack Buck and Sparky Anderson (CBS); Jon Miller and Tom Marr (WFBR); Harry Kalas, Richie Ashburn, Andy Musser, and Chris Wheeler (WCAU)
- ALCS: Baltimore Orioles over Chicago White Sox (3–1)
- NLCS: Philadelphia Phillies over Los Angeles Dodgers (3–1)

The 1983 World Series was the championship series of Major League Baseball's (MLB) 1983 season. The 80th edition of the World Series, it was a best-of-seven playoff played between the American League champion Baltimore Orioles and the National League champion Philadelphia Phillies. The Orioles won, four games to one to win their third title. "The I-95 Series", like the World Series two years later, also took its nickname from the interstate that the teams and fans traveled on, Interstate 95 in this case. This was the last World Series that Bowie Kuhn presided over as commissioner, as well as Pete Rose’s final World Series appearance.

This was the first World Series since 1956 in which the teams did not use air travel, as Baltimore and Philadelphia are approximately 100 miles (160 km) apart.

It was the Phillies’ second World Series appearance in four years. It would be 10 years before they would appear in the Fall Classic again and 25 years before they would win another.

As of 2026, this is Baltimore's most recent World Series championship, and also their most recent appearance in a World Series. The Orioles currently hold the fifth longest championship drought in the majors.

This was the first World Series in which no umpire worked behind home plate using the outside chest protector, which had been mandatory in the American League from the 1920s through 1974. The AL required all new umpires to use the inside protector, near-universal in the National League since Bill Klem invented it in the 1910s, starting in 1977, but umpires using the outside protector could continue to use it if they wished. World Series crew chief Marty Springstead used the outside protector from the beginning of his career in 1965 until switching to the inside protector prior to the 1983 regular season. Many 1-0 series comebacks have been completed in the World Series, but as of 2026, this is the last one to be completed in 5 games.

== Preview ==
=== Baltimore Orioles ===
The Orioles were led by first-year manager Joe Altobelli, who succeeded Earl Weaver; Weaver retired to the broadcast booth after a 16-year managerial run from 1968 to 1982. Altobelli inherited a lineup led by first baseman Eddie Murray (.306 BA, 33 HR, 111 RBI), who finished second in the 1983 MVP voting, and shortstop Cal Ripken Jr. (.318 BA, 27 HR, 102 RBI), who out-pointed Murray, 322–290, and won the 1983 MVP. Veteran outfielder Ken Singleton settled into the DH role, while the rest of the team was a corps of platoon players. The Orioles finished first in the AL in team home runs (168); first in OBP (.340); and second in runs, doubles, and walks.

After winning 15 games in 1982, 37-year-old pitcher Jim Palmer started only 11 games in 1983, winning five and losing four. He won one game in this World Series and would be released by the O's at the beginning of 1984 after struggling early, retiring shortly afterwards. A younger staff headed by 18-game winner Scott McGregor (18–7, 3.18 ERA) and 25-year-old Mike Boddicker (16–8, 2.77) were flanked by 21-year-old Storm Davis (13–7, 3.59) and veteran Mike Flanagan (12–4, 3.30). Reliever Tippy Martinez posted a career high with 21 saves, while Sammy Stewart added nine wins out of the bullpen as the O's pitching led the AL in shutouts (15) and was second in wins (98) and ERA (3.63).

The Orioles won the American League East by six games over the Detroit Tigers. They then defeated the Chicago White Sox, three games to one, in the American League Championship Series.

=== Philadelphia Phillies ===
The average age of the players on the Phillies' roster was 32 years. They were aptly nicknamed the "Wheeze Kids," a contrast to the 1950 Phillies team whose average age of 26 years earned them the moniker "Whiz Kids." Sports writers in Philadelphia joked at the time that this older team emphasized the veteran in their home ballpark, Veterans Stadium. The Phillies were trying to win Philadelphia its second World Title of the year as the Philadelphia 76ers had won the NBA Title back in June, as well as their second championship in four seasons — having won the 1980 World Series.

Joining 42-year-old first baseman Pete Rose were his Cincinnati Reds teammates from the "Big Red Machine" era, first baseman Tony Pérez (age 41) and second baseman Joe Morgan (age 39). The team was led offensively by 33-year-old Mike Schmidt, who would have another MVP-type year with 40 home runs and 109 RBIs. No other teammate would hit over 16 home runs (Morgan) or drive in over 64 runs (catcher Bo Díaz).

Although veteran pitcher Steve Carlton won his 300th major league game during the regular season, he actually had a mediocre year at 15–16 — his first losing season since 1973 when his record was 13–20. In his first full season with Philadelphia, John Denny would win the Cy Young Award with a league leading 19–6 record, and a 2.37 ERA, winning 13 of his last 14 decisions. Closer Al Holland would finish second in the league with 25 saves and win the NL Rolaids Relief Award. A pair of relief pitchers, 40-year-old Ron Reed and 38-year-old Tug McGraw, were on the active roster but McGraw would not see any World Series action.

The Phillies outpaced their intrastate rivals, the Pittsburgh Pirates, by six games to win their fifth National League East division title in eight years. This was followed by a three-games-to-one victory over the Los Angeles Dodgers in the National League Championship Series. It was only the fourth league championship for the Phillies in franchise history.

== Summary ==
AL Baltimore Orioles (4) vs. NL Philadelphia Phillies (1)

Game	Date	Score	Location	Time	Attendance
1	October 11	Philadelphia Phillies – 2, Baltimore Orioles – 1	Memorial Stadium	2:22	52,204
2	October 12	Philadelphia Phillies – 1, Baltimore Orioles – 4	Memorial Stadium	2:27	52,132
3	October 14	Baltimore Orioles – 3, Philadelphia Phillies – 2	Veterans Stadium	2:35	65,792
4	October 15	Baltimore Orioles – 5, Philadelphia Phillies – 4	Veterans Stadium	2:50	66,947
5	October 16	Baltimore Orioles – 5, Philadelphia Phillies – 0	Veterans Stadium	2:21	67,064

== Matchups ==
=== Game 1 ===
Tuesday, October 11, 1983 8:30 pm (ET) at Memorial Stadium in Baltimore, Maryland 63 °F (17 °C), light rain
Team	1	2	3	4	5	6	7	8	9	R	H	E
Philadelphia	0	0	0	0	0	1	0	1	0	2	5	0
Baltimore	1	0	0	0	0	0	0	0	0	1	5	1
WP: John Denny (1–0) LP: Scott McGregor (0–1) Sv: Al Holland (1); Home runs: PHI: Joe Morgan (1), Garry Maddox (1); BAL: Jim Dwyer (1)

John Denver, whose "Thank God I'm a Country Boy" was played at the seventh-inning stretch of each Orioles home game, sang the National Anthem.

Phillies starter John Denny gave up a first-inning homer to Jim Dwyer, but that would be it for the Orioles as 40-year-old Joe Morgan tied it with a home run in the sixth off Scott McGregor. Morgan became the second-oldest man to hit a home run in the World Series (Enos Slaughter was just a few months older than Morgan when he hit one for the New York Yankees in the 1956 World Series). Garry Maddox led off the eighth with a home run off McGregor for the final margin. Denny got the win with relief help from ace Al Holland.

The Orioles' loss in Game 1 marked the first time in six World Series that they had lost the first game.

=== Game 2 ===
Wednesday, October 12, 1983 8:20 pm (ET) at Memorial Stadium in Baltimore, Maryland 70 °F (21 °C), overcast
Team	1	2	3	4	5	6	7	8	9	R	H	E
Philadelphia	0	0	0	1	0	0	0	0	0	1	3	0
Baltimore	0	0	0	0	3	0	1	0	X	4	9	1
WP: Mike Boddicker (1–0) LP: Charles Hudson (0–1); Home runs: PHI: None; BAL: John Lowenstein (1)

Boddicker went the distance, striking out six and walking no one. He allowed only three hits and one run, a fourth-inning sacrifice fly by Joe Lefebvre. The O's got their runs in the fifth on a John Lowenstein homer, a Rick Dempsey RBI double, and a sacrifice fly by Boddicker, helping his own cause. Cal Ripken added an RBI single in the seventh.

This would be the final postseason baseball game ever played at Memorial Stadium.

=== Game 3 ===
Friday, October 14, 1983 8:30 pm (ET) at Veterans Stadium in Philadelphia, Pennsylvania 62 °F (17 °C), mostly clear
Team	1	2	3	4	5	6	7	8	9	R	H	E
Baltimore	0	0	0	0	0	1	2	0	0	3	6	1
Philadelphia	0	1	1	0	0	0	0	0	0	2	8	2
WP: Jim Palmer (1–0) LP: Steve Carlton (0–1) Sv: Tippy Martinez (1); Home runs: BAL: Dan Ford (1); PHI: Gary Matthews (1), Joe Morgan (2)

Steve Carlton became the first 300-game winner to pitch in a World Series in 55 years (Grover Cleveland Alexander was the last). Carlton shut out the Orioles through five innings, buoyed by homers from Gary Matthews and Joe Morgan. The Orioles cut the lead to one in the sixth on a homer by Dan Ford.

In the bottom of the sixth, the Phillies had two on and two outs with Carlton coming up to bat. Phillie manager Paul Owens went to the on-deck circle to chat with Carlton about staying in the game. Carlton said he was fine, but struck out for the final out.

Carlton looked to be cruising with two outs in the seventh, but Rick Dempsey belted a double and went to third on a wild pitch. Benny Ayala pinch-hit and singled home Dempsey to tie it. Al Holland relieved Carlton to try to close out the inning, but John Shelby singled Ayala to put runners at first and second. Ayala scored the go-ahead run from second on an error by shortstop Iván DeJesús on a ball hit by Ford.

Long-time Oriole pitching hero Jim Palmer got the win in relief as he, Sammy Stewart, and Tippy Martinez pitched five shutout innings in relief of Mike Flanagan. This win by Palmer, along with his first World Series win in 1966, marks the longest span (17 years) over World Series wins for an individual pitcher in major league history. Jim Palmer's win in Game 3 made him the only pitcher to win a World Series game in three different decades. Palmer is also the only man to have played with the Orioles in each of their World Series appearances (1966, 1969, 1970, 1971, 1979, and 1983). With Palmer and Carlton earning the decisions, this was the last World Series game in which both the winning and losing pitcher were later inducted into the Hall of Fame until 1992.

It was the first World Series game in which three Cy Young Award winners, Carlton, Palmer and Orioles' starter Mike Flanagan, pitched. This would not happen again until Game 1 of the 2012 Series, when Barry Zito, Tim Lincecum and Justin Verlander appeared.

For the first time in his career, Pete Rose was not in the starting lineup of a postseason game. Benched in favor of Tony Pérez, Rose grounded out in the ninth inning as a pinch-hitter.

=== Game 4 ===
Saturday, October 15, 1983 1:00 pm (ET) at Veterans Stadium in Philadelphia, Pennsylvania 70 °F (21 °C), sunny
Team	1	2	3	4	5	6	7	8	9	R	H	E
Baltimore	0	0	0	2	0	2	1	0	0	5	10	1
Philadelphia	0	0	0	1	2	0	0	0	1	4	10	0
WP: Storm Davis (1–0) LP: John Denny (1–1) Sv: Tippy Martinez (2)

Rich Dauer broke a scoreless tie by singling in two runs in the fourth off John Denny. The Phillies came back in the fourth off Storm Davis with an RBI double by Joe Lefebvre and took the lead in the fifth on an RBI single by Denny and an RBI double by Pete Rose.

In the top of the sixth with one out, John Lowenstein singled and Dauer doubled him to third. O's manager Joe Altobelli then sent Joe Nolan, the first of four consecutive pinch-hitters, to the plate. Denny intentionally walked Nolan to load the bases. The next pinch-hitter, Ken Singleton, walked as well to force in Lowenstein with the tying run. John Denny was removed in favor of Willie Hernandez. John Shelby, hitting for Storm Davis, hit a deep sacrifice fly to Gary Matthews who made a remarkable catch to keep the O's ahead 4–3.

The Orioles added an insurance run in the seventh on an RBI single by Dauer, who would collect three hits and three RBIs. The Phillies would get no closer than a single run in the ninth, as Tippy Martinez got his second save of the series.

The crowd of 66,947 in Veterans Stadium was the biggest for the World Series since Game 3 in New York in 1964.

This is the last World Series game with a scheduled daytime start played under sunny skies. Game 4 of the 1984 World Series was played under overcast skies at Tiger Stadium, and game 6 of the 1987 World Series (last World Series game with a daytime start) was played indoors at the Hubert H. Humphrey Metrodome.

=== Game 5 ===
Sunday, October 16, 1983 5:00 pm (ET) at Veterans Stadium in Philadelphia, Pennsylvania 61 °F (16 °C), clear
Team	1	2	3	4	5	6	7	8	9	R	H	E
Baltimore	0	1	1	2	1	0	0	0	0	5	5	0
Philadelphia	0	0	0	0	0	0	0	0	0	0	5	1
WP: Scott McGregor (1–1) LP: Charles Hudson (0–2); Home runs: BAL: Eddie Murray 2 (2), Rick Dempsey (1); PHI: None

Throughout this series, both teams' big gun hitters had been held in check. Mike Schmidt was 1 for 16, while Eddie Murray was 2 for 16. In this game, however, Murray snapped out of it by belting two home runs and driving in three runs. Rick Dempsey, who would be named MVP, also homered and doubled and scored two runs. Scott McGregor pitched a complete game, five-hit shutout to give the Orioles the championship. Cal Ripken Jr. made the final putout of the series, snaring a liner by Garry Maddox.

The Phillies finished this Series with a team batting average of .195, with no one having a worse Series than Schmidt, going a paltry 1 for 20 (.050 batting average) and overall the lowest average for a World Series team since the 1974 Oakland Athletics. The winning Orioles hit only .213 in the series.

The Philadelphia Eagles were originally scheduled to play the Dallas Cowboys on Sunday, October 16, at Veterans Stadium. Because of the scheduling conflict, the Eagles and the Cowboys, who were scheduled for two games against each other because they were in the same division, played on that day on the Cowboys' field, Texas Stadium. (Their other game had been scheduled for November 6 at Texas Stadium, and that game was played at Veterans Stadium.)

In addition to the Phillies being eliminated, the Philadelphia Eagles and Philadelphia Flyers also lost on the same night. This situation would happen a second time on October 9, 2025, when the Phillies were eliminated by the Los Angeles Dodgers in Game 4 of the 2025 National League Division Series.

== Composite box ==
1983 World Series (4–1): Baltimore Orioles (A.L.) over Philadelphia Phillies (N.L.)

Team	1	2	3	4	5	6	7	8	9	R	H	E
Baltimore Orioles	1	1	1	4	4	3	4	0	0	18	35	4
Philadelphia Phillies	0	1	1	2	2	1	0	1	1	9	31	3
Total attendance: 304,139 Average attendance: 60,828; Winning player's share: $65,488 Losing player's share: $44,473

== Aftermath ==
Pitcher Larry Andersen was the only person to play for the Phillies in the 1983 World Series and the 1993 World Series against Toronto. Also, this series proved to be Cal Ripken's only World Series appearance even though the Orioles shortstop would become baseball's iron-man as he would surpass Lou Gehrig by playing in his 2,131st consecutive game on September 6, 1995. Ripken would also make it back to the postseason in both the 1996 and 1997 seasons only reaching the ALCS each time. Teammate Eddie Murray would reach the World Series again but the 1995 Cleveland Indians would lose in six games. Storm Davis, John Shelby, and series MVP Rick Dempsey would reach the 1988 World Series, Davis with the Oakland Athletics and Shelby and Dempsey with the Los Angeles Dodgers.

Baltimore became the first visiting team to win Games 3, 4 and 5 since 1961, when the New York Yankees did so vs. the Cincinnati Reds at Crosley Field. This has occurred three times since 1983. The first was 1996, when the Yankees again did it, this time against the Atlanta Braves in the final three games played at Atlanta–Fulton County Stadium; the next was 2019, when the Houston Astros did it against the Washington Nationals at Nationals Park, although the Astros became the first team to lose a World Series after winning games 3, 4 and 5 on the road, dropping games 6 and 7 at Minute Maid Park (making it the first it the first time in the history of any of the Big 4 leagues that the visiting team won every game of a 7-game series); and in 2023, when the Texas Rangers did it against the Arizona Diamondbacks at Chase Field. By comparison, the home team has swept Games 3–5 12 times since 1965. Additionally, Baltimore was the last team to lost Game 1 of a World Series and win the next four games.

This would be the final World Series with color commentator Howard Cosell. Two years later, Cosell was scheduled to be in the booth but he was removed at the last minute due to the controversy surrounding his book I Never Played the Game and was replaced with Tim McCarver.

== Quotes ==
A liner and the Orioles are the world champions!

— Al Michaels calling the final out on ABC Sports

== See also ==
- 1983 Japan Series

== Bibliography ==
- Neft, David S.; Cohen, Richard M. (1990). The World Series (1st ed.). New York: St Martins. pp. 398–401.
