= 1983 Baltimore Orioles season =

1983 Baltimore Orioles
- World Series champions American League champions American League East champions
- League: American League
- Division: East Division
- Ballpark: Memorial Stadium
- City: Baltimore
- Record: 98–64 (.605)
- Divisional place: 1st
- Owners: Edward Bennett Williams
- General managers: Hank Peters
- Managers: Joe Altobelli
- Television: WMAR-TV (Chuck Thompson, Brooks Robinson); Super TV (Rex Barney,Ted Patterson)
- Radio: WFBR (Jon Miller, Tom Marr)

The 1983 Baltimore Orioles won the Major League Baseball World Series after finishing first in the American League East with a record of 98 wins and 64 losses, The Orioles won the championship by beating the Philadelphia Philles, 4–1, in the 1983 World Series. The season was the Orioles' first in nearly 15 years without manager Earl Weaver, who retired after the Orioles missed the playoffs in the final game of the 1982 season. The Orioles replaced the future Hall of Famer Weaver with Joe Altobelli.

As of today, this is the most recent time the Orioles won a World Series, as well as their most recent World Series appearance.

After many years the Orioles made the jump to cable television, with a separate broadcast team on their then first cable broadcaster, Super TV. They would move to Home Team Sports the following year.

== Offseason ==
- October 19, 1982: RHP, Don Stanhouse was released by the Orioles.
- November 13, 1982 Named Manager, Joe Altobelli
- November 29, 1982 signed, LHP, Dan Morogiello as a free agent.
- January 15, 1983: Catcher, Joe Nolan was re-signed as a free agent with the Baltimore Orioles.
- February 3, 1983: Third Baseman, Aurelio Rodriguez was signed as a free agent with the Baltimore Orioles.
- February 23, 1983: Outfielder, John Lowenstein was re-signed as a free agent with the Baltimore Orioles.
- April 4, 1983 Pinch Hitter/Outfielder Terry Crowley was released by the Orioles

== Regular season ==
=== Season standings ===
AL East
Team	W	L	Pct.	GB	Home	Road
Baltimore Orioles	98	64	.605	—	50‍–‍31	48‍–‍33
Detroit Tigers	92	70	.568	6	48‍–‍33	44‍–‍37
New York Yankees	91	71	.562	7	51‍–‍30	40‍–‍41
Toronto Blue Jays	89	73	.549	9	48‍–‍33	41‍–‍40
Milwaukee Brewers	87	75	.537	11	52‍–‍29	35‍–‍46
Boston Red Sox	78	84	.481	20	38‍–‍43	40‍–‍41
Cleveland Indians	70	92	.432	28	36‍–‍45	34‍–‍47

=== Record vs. opponents ===
1983 American League record Sources:
Team	BAL	BOS	CAL	CWS	CLE	DET	KC	MIL	MIN	NYY	OAK	SEA	TEX	TOR
Baltimore	—	8–5	7–5	7–5	6–7	5–8	8–4	11–2	8–4	6–7	8–4	8–4	9–3	7–6
Boston	5–8	—	6–6	6–6	7–6	4–9	5–7	4–9	5–7	7–6	8–4	7–5	7–5	7–6
California	5–7	6–6	—	3–10	8–4	4–8	6–7	6–6	6–7	5–7	5–8	6–7	6–7	4–8
Chicago	5–7	6–6	10–3	—	8–4	8–4	9–4	4–8	8–5	8–4	8–5	12–1	8–5	5–7
Cleveland	7–6	6–7	4–8	4–8	—	5–8	7–5	3–10	6–6	6–7	7–5	8–4	3–9	4–9
Detroit	8–5	9–4	8–4	4–8	8–5	—	7–5	6–7	9–3	5–8	6–6	8–4	8–4	6–7
Kansas City	4–8	7–5	7–6	4–9	5–7	5–7	—	6–6	6–7	6–6	7–6	8–5	8–5–1	6–6
Milwaukee	2–11	9–4	6–6	8–4	10–3	7–6	6–6	—	8–4	4–9	6–6	5–7	8–4	8–5
Minnesota	4–8	7–5	7–6	5–8	6–6	3–9	7–6	4–8	—	4–8	4–9	9–4	5–8	5–7
New York	7–6	6–7	7–5	4–8	7–6	8–5	6–6	9–4	8–4	—	8–4	7–5	7–5	7–6
Oakland	4–8	4–8	8–5	5–8	5–7	6–6	6–7	6–6	9–4	4–8	—	9–4	2–11	6–6
Seattle	4–8	5–7	7–6	1–12	4–8	4–8	5–8	7–5	4–9	5–7	4–9	—	6–7	4–8
Texas	3–9	5–7	7–6	5–8	9–3	4–8	5–8–1	4–8	8–5	5–7	11–2	7–6	—	4–8
Toronto	6–7	6–7	8–4	7–5	9–4	7–6	6–6	5–8	7–5	6–7	6–6	8–4	8–4	—

=== Opening Day starters ===
- Rich Dauer
- Rick Dempsey
- Dan Ford
- Leo Hernández
- Dennis Martínez
- Eddie Murray
- Cal Ripken Jr.
- Gary Roenicke
- John Shelby
- Ken Singleton

=== Notable transactions ===
- June 13, 1983: Traded catcher/third baseman Floyd Rayford (playing for the Rochester Red Wings at the time of the trade) to the St. Louis Cardinals for a player to be named later
- June 30, 1983: Todd Cruz was purchased by the Orioles from the Seattle Mariners.
- August 13, 1983: Aurelio Rodriguez was released by the Baltimore Orioles.
- August 31, 1983: Acquired outfielder Tito Landrum from the St. Louis Cardinals completing the Floyd Rayford trade.

== An Overview of the Team ==
On April 3, 1983, the Baltimore Orioles left spring training with much the same team that fell just a game short of the playoffs the year before. Of the Orioles starting in the 1982 Opening Day lineup only Lenn Sakata and Al Bumbry would lose their opening day spots in 1983. Terry Crowley was the last player cut during spring training, and on his way out of the clubhouse he predicted an Orioles championship, "The shame of it is," he told a Sun reporter, "the Orioles are going to win in it all this year, and Joe is going to do a tremendous job" Still, the team was an up-and-coming squad, in fact, no Oriole would be voted on to the All Star team's starting lineup. However, the team featured three future Hall of Famers:

- Cal Ripken who had won Rookie of the Year honors the year before completed his transition from third base to shortstop playing his first full season at his new position
- Perennial All-Star Eddie Murray won a Silver Slugger Award and Gold Glove Award at first base
- The aging Jim Palmer started only 11 games but would come out of the bullpen for his final career victory in the World Series
- During an August 24, 1983 game, Orioles pitcher Tippy Martinez picked off three Toronto Blue Jays baserunners in one inning. The baserunners were Barry Bonnell, Dave Collins and Willie Upshaw.

While the Orioles fielded a team similar to the team fielded in 1982 Altobelli put his own mark on the squad by breaking camp with a four-man rotation which occasionally increased to five pitchers rather than the three man rotation preferred by Weaver.

== Starting pitching ==
One significant difference between the 1982 Baltimore Orioles and the 1983 Baltimore Orioles was Altobelli's willingness to use different starting pitchers. Ten different, Orioles pitchers would take the mound to start a game in 1983 whereas in 1982 only six players got the starting nod.

1983 Baltimore Orioles roster
Roster
Pitchers: 52 Mike Boddicker; 34 Storm Davis; 46 Mike Flanagan; 30 Dennis Martínez; 23 Tippy Martinez; 16 Scott McGregor; 39 Paul Mirabella; 21 Dan Morogiello; 22 Jim Palmer; 36 Allan Ramirez; 53 Sammy Stewart; 49 Tim Stoddard; 32 Bill Swaggerty; 51 Don Welchel	Catchers: 24 Rick Dempsey; 18 Dave Huppert; 17 Joe Nolan; 9 John Stefero; Infielders: 2 Bobby Bonner; 10 Todd Cruz; 25 Rich Dauer; 11 Glenn Gulliver; 3 Leo Hernández; 33 Eddie Murray; 8 Cal Ripken Jr.; 6 Aurelio Rodríguez; 12 Lenn Sakata	Outfielders: 27 Benny Ayala; 1 Al Bumbry; 28 Jim Dwyer; 15 Dan Ford; 39 Tito Landrum; 38 John Lowenstein; 35 Gary Roenicke; 37 John Shelby; 43 Mike Young; Other batters: 29 Ken Singleton	Manager: 26 Joe Altobelli; Coaches: 44 Elrod Hendricks; 31 Ray Miller; 47 Cal Ripken, Sr.; 54 Ralph Rowe; 40 Jimmy Williams

== Game log ==
=== Regular season ===
Past games legend
Orioles Win (#bfb)	Orioles Loss (#fbb)	Game postponed (#bbb)	Clinched division (#090)
Bold denotes an Orioles pitcher

1983 Baltimore Orioles Regular Season game log: 98–64 (Home: 50–31; Away: 48–33)
April: 11–9 (Home: 6–3; Away: 5–6)

#	Date	Time (ET)	Opponent	Score	Win	Loss	Save	Time of Game	Stadium	Attendance	Record	Box/ Streak
1	April 4		Royals									
2	April 6		Royals									
—	April 7		Royals	**Postponed (rain)** (Makeup date: August 19)								
5	April 12	2:15 p.m. EST	@ White Sox	10–8	**Stewart** (1–1)	Lamp (1–1)	—	3:09	Comiskey Park (I)	38,306	3–2	W2
6	April 14	2:15 p.m. EST	@ White Sox	11–12	Barojas (1–0)	**Welchel** (0–1)	Hickey (2)	3:56	Comiskey Park (I)	13,622	3–3	L1

May: 15–13 (Home: 8–6; Away: 7–7)

#	Date	Time (ET)	Opponent	Score	Win	Loss	Save	Time of Game	Stadium	Attendance	Record	Box/ Streak
—	May 16		White Sox	**Postponed (rain)** (Makeup date: May 17)								
33 (1)	May 17	5:05 p.m. EDT	White Sox	7–2	**Stoddard** (2–0)	Hoyt (2–6)	—	2:36	**Memorial Stadium**	—	20–13	W1
34 (2)	May 17	8:11 p.m. EDT	White Sox	5–0	**Boddicker** (1–0)	Lamp (3–3)	—	2:24	**Memorial Stadium**	14,314	21–13	W2
35	May 18	7:35 p.m. EDT	White Sox	1–0	**T. Martinez** (2–1)	Dotson (4–4)	—	2:21	**Memorial Stadium**	12,582	22–13	W3
43	May 26		@ Royals									
44	May 27		@ Royals									
45	May 28		@ Royals									
46	May 29		@ Royals									

June: 14–11 (Home: 9–6; Away: 5–5)

#	Date	Time (ET)	Opponent	Score	Win	Loss	Save	Time of Game	Stadium	Attendance	Record	Box/ Streak
68	June 24		Tigers									
69	June 25		Tigers									
70	June 26		Tigers									

July: 19–7 (Home: 10–3; Away: 9–4)

#	Date	Time (ET)	Opponent	Score	Win	Loss	Save	Time of Game	Stadium	Attendance	Record	Box/ Streak
74	July 1		@ Tigers									
75	July 2		@ Tigers									
76	July 3		@ Tigers									
—	July 4		@ Tigers	**Postponed (rain)** (Makeup date: September 21)								
ASG	July 6	8:40 p.m. EDT	NL @ AL	–			—		Comiskey Park (I)		—	

August: 18–12 (Home: 9–7; Away: 9–5)

#	Date	Time (ET)	Opponent	Score	Win	Loss	Save	Time of Game	Stadium	Attendance	Record	Box/ Streak
104	August 5	7:35 p.m. EDT	White Sox	5–4	**Boddicker** (8–5)	Lamp (5–7)	—	3:16	**Memorial Stadium**	39,544	62–42	W3
105	August 6	7:35 p.m. EDT	White Sox	4–6	Bannister (9–9)	D. Martínez (6–14)	Barojas (10)	3:26	**Memorial Stadium**	32,769	62–43	L1
106	August 7	2:05 p.m. EDT	White Sox	3–4	Hoyt (14–10)	**Flanagan** (6–1)	Lamp (8)	2:27	**Memorial Stadium**	32,769	62–44	L2
110	August 11	8:30 p.m. EDT	@ White Sox	3–9	Bannister (10–9)	**Ramirez** (4–3)	—	3:34	Comiskey Park (I)	31,810	62–48	L6
111	August 12	8:30 p.m. EDT	@ White Sox	1–2	Hoyt (15–10)	**Flanagan** (6–2)	—	2:41	Comiskey Park (I)	45,588	62–49	L7
112	August 13	8:30 p.m. EDT	@ White Sox	5–2	**Stewart** (4–3)	Koosman (8–5)	**T. Martinez** (12)	2:27	Comiskey Park (I)	36,323	63–49	W1
113	August 14	2:15 p.m. EDT	@ White Sox	2–1	**McGregor** (15–5)	Dotson (12–7)	**Stoddard** (5)	2:51	Comiskey Park (I)	37,846	64–49	W2
117 (1)	August 19		Royals									
118 (2)	August 19		Royals									
119	August 20		Royals									
120	August 21		Royals									
127	August 29		@ Royals									
128	August 30		@ Royals									

September: 20–11 (Home: 6–5; Away: 14–6)

#	Date	Time (ET)	Opponent	Score	Win	Loss	Save	Time of Game	Stadium	Attendance	Record	Box/ Streak
149	September 20		@ Tigers									
150 (1)	September 21		@ Tigers									
151 (2)	September 21		@ Tigers									
152	September 22		@ Tigers									
156	September 27		Tigers									
157	September 28		Tigers									
158	September 29		Tigers									

October: 1–1 (Home: 1–1; Away: 0–0)

#	Date	Time (ET)	Opponent	Score	Win	Loss	Save	Time of Game	Stadium	Attendance	Record	Box/ Streak

=== Detailed records ===
**American League**
Opponent	Home	Away	Total	Pct.	Runs scored	Runs allowed
**AL East**
**Baltimore Orioles**	—	—	—	—	—	—
Detroit Tigers	1–5	4–3	5–8	0.385	52	85
Div Total	1–5	4–3	5–8	0.385	52	85
**AL West**
Chicago White Sox	4–2	3–3	7–5	0.583	57	50
Kansas City Royals	4–2	4–2	8–4	0.667	61	44
Div Total	8–4	7–5	15–9	0.625	118	94
Season Total	9–9	11–8	20–17	0.541	170	179

Month	Games	Won	Lost	Win %	RS	RA
April	20	11	9	0.550	107	87
May	28	15	13	0.536	126	124
June	25	14	11	0.560	112	106
July	26	19	7	0.731	148	95
August	30	18	12	0.600	144	108
September	31	20	11	0.645	156	127
October	2	1	1	0.500	6	5
Total	162	98	64	0.605	799	652

	Games	Won	Lost	Win %	RS	RA
Home	81	50	31	0.617	389	328
Away	81	48	33	0.593	410	324
Total	162	98	64	0.605	799	652

=== Composite Box ===
1983 Baltimore Orioles Inning–by–Inning Boxscore
Team	1	2	3	4	5	6	7	8	9	10	11	12	R	H	E
Opponents
Orioles

=== Postseason ===
Past games legend
Orioles Win (#bfb)	Orioles Loss (#fbb)
Bold denotes an Orioles pitcher

1983 Postseason game log: 7–2 (Home: 2–2; Away: 5–0)
AL Championship Series: vs. Chicago White Sox 3–1 (Home: 1–1; Away: 2–0)

#	Date	Time (ET)	Opponent	Score	Win	Loss	Save	Time of Game	Stadium	Attendance	Series	Box/ Streak
1	October 5	3:05 p.m. EDT	White Sox	1–2	Hoyt (1–0)	**McGregor** (0–1)	—	2:38	**Memorial Stadium**	51,289	CHA 1–0	L1
2	October 6	8:20 p.m. EDT	White Sox	4–0	**Boddicker** (1–0)	Bannister (0–1)	—	2:51	**Memorial Stadium**	52,347	TIE 1–1	W1
3	October 7	8:20 p.m. EDT	@ White Sox	11–1	**Flanagan** (1–0)	Dotson (0–1)	**Stewart** (1)	2:58	Comiskey Park (I)	46,635	BAL 2–1	W2
4	October 8	1:05 p.m. EDT	@ White Sox	3–0 (10)	**T. Martinez** (1–0)	Burns (0–1)	—	3:41	Comiskey Park (I)	45,477	BAL 3–1	W3

World Series: vs. Philadelphia Phillies 4–1 (Home: 1–1; Away: 3–0)

#	Date	Time (ET)	Opponent	Score	Win	Loss	Save	Time of Game	Stadium	Attendance	Series	Box/ Streak
1	October 11	8:30 p.m. EDT	Phillies	1–2	Denny (1–0)	**McGregor** (0–1)	Holland (1)	2:22	**Memorial Stadium**	52,204	PHI 1–0	L1
2	October 12	8:20 p.m. EDT	Phillies	4–1	**Boddicker** (1–0)	Hudson (0–1)	—	2:27	**Memorial Stadium**	52,132	TIE 1–1	W1
3	October 14	8:30 p.m. EDT	@ Phillies	3–2	**Palmer** (1–0)	Carlton (0–1)	**T. Martinez** (1)	2:35	Veterans Stadium	65,792	BAL 2–1	W2
4	October 15	1:00 p.m. EDT	@ Phillies	5–4	**Davis** (1–0)	Denny (1–1)	**T. Martinez** (2)	2:50	Veterans Stadium	66,947	BAL 3–1	W3
5	October 16	5:00 p.m. EDT	@ Phillies	5–0	**McGregor** (1–1)	Hudson (0–2)	—	2:21	Veterans Stadium	67,064	BAL 4–1	W4

== Player stats ==
= Indicates team leader

=== Batting ===
= Indicates league leader

==== Starters by position ====
Note: Pos = Position; G = Games played; AB = At bats; R = Runs; H = Hits; Avg. = Batting average; HR = Home runs; RBI = Runs batted in; SB= Stolen bases

⌖	Player	G	AB	R	H	AVG	HR	RBI	SB
C	Rick Dempsey	128	347	33	80	.231	4	32	1
1B	Eddie Murray	156	582	115	178	.306	33	111	5
2B	Rich Dauer	140	459	49	108	.235	5	41	1
3B	Todd Cruz	81	221	16	46	.208	3	27	3
SS	Cal Ripken	162	663	121	211	.318	27	102	0
LF	John Lowenstein	122	310	52	87	.281	15	60	2
CF	Al Bumbry	124	378	63	104	.275	3	31	12
RF	Dan Ford	103	407	63	114	.280	9	55	9
DH	Ken Singleton	151	507	52	140	.276	18	84	0

==== Other batters ====
Note: G = Games played; AB = At bats; R = Runs; H = Hits; Avg. = Batting average; HR = Home runs; RBI = Runs batted in; SB= Stolen bases

Player	G	AB	R	H	AVG	HR	RBI	SB
John Shelby	126	325	52	84	.258	5	27	15
Gary Roenicke	115	323	45	84	.260	19	64	2
Leo Hernández	64	203	21	50	.246	6	26	1
Jim Dwyer	100	196	37	56	.286	8	38	1
Joe Nolan	73	184	25	51	.277	5	24	0
Lenn Sakata	66	134	23	34	.254	3	12	8
Benny Ayala	47	104	12	23	.221	4	13	0
Aurelio Rodríguez	45	67	0	8	.119	0	2	0
Glenn Gulliver	23	47	5	10	.213	0	2	0
Tito Landrum	26	42	8	13	.310	1	4	0
Mike Young	25	36	5	6	.167	0	2	1
John Stefero	9	11	2	5	.455	0	4	0
Bobby Bonner	6	0	0	0	----	0	0	0
Dave Huppert	2	0	0	0	----	0	0	0

=== Pitching ===
==== Starting pitchers ====
Note: G = Games pitched; IP = Innings pitched; W = Wins; L = Losses; ERA = Earned run average; BB = Walks allowed; SO = Strikeouts

Player	G	IP	W	L	ERA	BB	SO
Scott McGregor	36	260.0	18	7	3.18	45	86
Storm Davis	34	200.1	13	7	3.59	64	125
Mike Boddicker	27	179.0	16	8	2.77	52	120
Dennis Martínez	32	153.0	7	16	5.53	45	71
Mike Flanagan	20	125.1	12	4	3.30	31	50
Jim Palmer	14	76.2	5	4	4.23	19	34
Allan Ramirez	11	57.0	4	4	3.47	30	20

==== Other pitchers ====
Note: G = Games pitched; IP = Innings pitched; W = Wins; L = Losses; ERA = Earned run average; BB = Walks allowed; SO = Strikeouts

Player	G	IP	W	L	ERA	BB	SO
Bill Swaggerty	7	21.2	1	1	2.91	6	7
Paul Mirabella	3	9.2	0	0	5.59	4	7

==== Relief pitchers ====
Note: G = Games pitched; IP = Innings pitched; W = Wins; L = Losses; SV = Saves; ERA = Earned run average; BB = Walks allowed; SO = Strikeouts

Player	G	IP	W	L	SV	ERA	BB	SO
Tippy Martinez	65	103.1	9	3	21	2.35	37	81
Sammy Stewart	58	144.1	9	4	7	3.62	67	95
Tim Stoddard	47	57.2	4	3	9	6.09	29	50
Dan Morogiello	22	37.2	0	1	1	2.39	10	15
Don Welchel	11	26.2	0	2	0	5.40	10	16

== Postseason ==
=== ALCS ===
==== Summary ====
Game	Score	Date	Location	Attendance
1	Chicago – 2, Baltimore – 1	October 5	Memorial Stadium	51,289
2	Chicago – 0, Baltimore – 4	October 6	Memorial Stadium	52,347
3	Baltimore – 11, Chicago – 1	October 7	Comiskey Park	46,635
4	Baltimore – 3, Chicago – 0	October 8	Comiskey Park	45,477

=== World Series ===
AL Baltimore Orioles (4) vs. NL Philadelphia Phillies (1)
Game	Score	Date	Location	Attendance	Time of Game
1	Phillies – 2, Orioles – 1	October 11	Memorial Stadium (Baltimore)	52,204	2:22
2	Phillies – 1, Orioles – 4	October 12	Memorial Stadium (Baltimore)	52,132	2:27
3	Orioles – 3, Phillies – 2	October 14	Veterans Stadium (Philadelphia)	65,792	2:35
4	Orioles – 5, Phillies – 4	October 15	Veterans Stadium (Philadelphia)	66,947	2:50
5	Orioles – 5, Phillies – 0	October 16	Veterans Stadium (Philadelphia)	67,064	2:21

== Awards and honors ==
- Mike Boddicker, ALCS Most Valuable Player
- Rick Dempsey, Babe Ruth Award
- Rick Dempsey – World Series Most Valuable Player
- Eddie Murray, Silver Slugger Award
- Cal Ripken Jr., American League Most Valuable Player

All-Star Game

=== League leaders ===
- Cal Ripken Jr. – American League Leader in At-Bats (663)
- Cal Ripken Jr. – American League Leader in Hits (211)
- Cal Ripken Jr. – American League Leader Runs Scored (121)
- Cal Ripken Jr. – American League Leader Doubles (47)

== Farm system ==
Level	Team	League	Manager
AAA	Rochester Red Wings	International League	Lance Nichols
AA	Charlotte O's	Southern League	Grady Little
A	Hagerstown Suns	Carolina League	John Hart
A-Short Season	Newark Orioles	New York–Penn League	Art Mazmanian
Rookie	Bluefield Orioles	Appalachian League	Greg Biagini
