= 1982 Baltimore Orioles season =

Major League Baseball season

1982 Baltimore Orioles
- League: American League
- Division: East
- Ballpark: Memorial Stadium
- City: Baltimore
- Record: 94–68 (.580)
- Divisional place: 2nd
- Owners: Edward Bennett Williams
- General managers: Hank Peters
- Managers: Earl Weaver
- Television: WMAR-TV
- Radio: WFBR (Chuck Thompson, Tom Marr)

The 1982 Baltimore Orioles season was the 82nd season in Baltimore Orioles franchise history, the 29th in Baltimore, and the 29th at Memorial Stadium. The Orioles finished second in the American League East to the eventual AL Champions Milwaukee Brewers. They finished with a record of 94 wins and 68 losses. For the second consecutive season, the Orioles recorded the most grand slams in MLB, hitting eight in 1982. This was long time Oriole manager and future Hall of Famer Earl Weaver's last season managing the Orioles until he returned to manage them from 1985 to 1986.

== Offseason ==
- January 28, 1982: Doug DeCinces and Jeff Schneider were traded by the Orioles to the California Angels for Dan Ford.
- February 9, 1982: The Orioles traded a player to be named later to the Cincinnati Reds for Paul Moskau. The Orioles completed the deal by sending Wayne Krenchicki to the Reds on February 16.
- February 19, 1982: The Orioles traded a player to be named later to the Texas Rangers for Rick Lisi. The Orioles completed the deal by sending Steve Luebber to the Rangers on February 23.
- March 4, 1982: John Flinn was signed as a free agent by the Orioles.
- March 26, 1982: Dallas Williams and Brooks Carey (minors) were traded by the Orioles to the Cincinnati Reds for Joe Nolan.

== Regular season ==
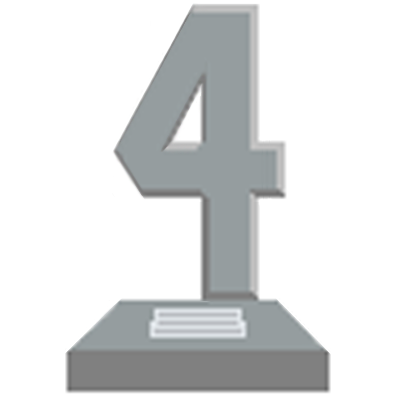
Earl
Weaver
Manager
Retired 1982

=== Opening Day starters ===
- Al Bumbry
- Rich Dauer
- Rick Dempsey
- Dan Ford
- Dennis Martínez
- Eddie Murray
- Cal Ripken Jr.
- Gary Roenicke
- Lenn Sakata
- Ken Singleton

=== Season standings ===
AL East
| Team | W | L | Pct. | GB | Home | Road |
|---|---|---|---|---|---|---|
| Milwaukee Brewers | 95 | 67 | .586 | — | 48‍–‍34 | 47‍–‍33 |
| Baltimore Orioles | 94 | 68 | .580 | 1 | 53‍–‍28 | 41‍–‍40 |
| Boston Red Sox | 89 | 73 | .549 | 6 | 49‍–‍32 | 40‍–‍41 |
| Detroit Tigers | 83 | 79 | .512 | 12 | 47‍–‍34 | 36‍–‍45 |
| New York Yankees | 79 | 83 | .488 | 16 | 42‍–‍39 | 37‍–‍44 |
| Cleveland Indians | 78 | 84 | .481 | 17 | 41‍–‍40 | 37‍–‍44 |
| Toronto Blue Jays | 78 | 84 | .481 | 17 | 44‍–‍37 | 34‍–‍47 |

=== Record vs. opponents ===
1982 American League record Sources:
| Team | BAL | BOS | CAL | CWS | CLE | DET | KC | MIL | MIN | NYY | OAK | SEA | TEX | TOR |
|---|---|---|---|---|---|---|---|---|---|---|---|---|---|---|
| Baltimore | — | 4–9 | 7–5 | 5–7 | 6–7 | 7–6 | 4–8 | 9–4–1 | 8–4 | 11–2 | 7–5 | 7–5 | 9–3 | 10–3 |
| Boston | 9–4 | — | 7–5 | 4–8 | 6–7 | 8–5 | 6–6 | 4–9 | 6–6 | 7–6 | 8–4 | 7–5 | 10–2 | 7–6 |
| California | 5–7 | 5–7 | — | 8–5 | 8–4 | 5–7 | 7–6 | 6–6 | 7–6 | 7–5 | 9–4 | 10–3 | 8–5 | 8–4 |
| Chicago | 7–5 | 8–4 | 5–8 | — | 6–6 | 9–3 | 3–10 | 3–9 | 7–6 | 8–4 | 9–4 | 6–7 | 8–5 | 8–4 |
| Cleveland | 7–6 | 7–6 | 4–8 | 6–6 | — | 6–7 | 2–10 | 7–6 | 8–4 | 4–9 | 4–8 | 9–3 | 7–5 | 7–6 |
| Detroit | 6–7 | 5–8 | 7–5 | 3–9 | 7–6 | — | 6–6 | 3–10 | 9–3 | 8–5 | 9–3 | 6–6 | 8–4 | 6–7 |
| Kansas City | 8–4 | 6–6 | 6–7 | 10–3 | 10–2 | 6–6 | — | 7–5 | 7–6 | 5–7 | 7–6 | 7–6 | 7–6 | 4–8 |
| Milwaukee | 4–9–1 | 9–4 | 6–6 | 9–3 | 6–7 | 10–3 | 5–7 | — | 7–5 | 8–5 | 7–5 | 8–4 | 7–5 | 9–4 |
| Minnesota | 4–8 | 6–6 | 6–7 | 6–7 | 4–8 | 3–9 | 6–7 | 5–7 | — | 2–10 | 3–10 | 5–8 | 5–8 | 5–7 |
| New York | 2–11 | 6–7 | 5–7 | 4–8 | 9–4 | 5–8 | 7–5 | 5–8 | 10–2 | — | 7–5 | 6–6 | 7–5 | 6–7 |
| Oakland | 5–7 | 4–8 | 4–9 | 4–9 | 8–4 | 3–9 | 6–7 | 5–7 | 10–3 | 5–7 | — | 6–7 | 5–8 | 3–9 |
| Seattle | 5–7 | 5–7 | 3–10 | 7–6 | 3–9 | 6–6 | 6–7 | 4–8 | 8–5 | 6–6 | 7–6 | — | 9–4 | 7–5 |
| Texas | 3–9 | 2–10 | 5–8 | 5–8 | 5–7 | 4–8 | 6–7 | 5–7 | 8–5 | 5–7 | 8–5 | 4–9 | — | 4–8 |
| Toronto | 3–10 | 6–7 | 4–8 | 4–8 | 6–7 | 7–6 | 8–4 | 4–9 | 7–5 | 7–6 | 9–3 | 5–7 | 8–4 | — |

=== Notable transactions ===
- April 5, 1982: Don Stanhouse was signed as a free agent by the Orioles.
- April 5, 1982: Ross Grimsley was signed as a free agent by the Orioles.
- April 28, 1982: Traded José Morales to the Los Angeles Dodgers for Leo Hernández.
- June 7, 1982: 1982 Major League Baseball draft
  - Dave Otto was drafted by the Orioles in the 2nd round, but did not sign.
  - Walt Weiss was drafted by the Orioles in the 10th round, but did not sign.
  - Billy Ripken was drafted by the Orioles in the 11th round. Player signed June 15, 1982.
- July 15, 1982: Don Stanhouse was released by the Orioles.
- July 23, 1982: Don Stanhouse was signed as a free agent by the Orioles.

=== A classic near-miss season ===
The '82 season was a classic, even though it eventually was as frustrating as those that had preceded it. Eddie Murray had 32 homers and 110 RBIs. Jim Palmer, in his last hurrah, went 15–5.

After starting slowly and falling eight games behind the Milwaukee Brewers in mid-August of '82, the Orioles rallied furiously. They won seven games in a row, lost one, won ten in a row, swept five straight from the New York Yankees, won two of three in Milwaukee to pull within two games of the Brewers with a week left. In the end, they needed to sweep a season-ending four-game series with the Brewers at Memorial Stadium to complete a comeback. They won the first three before roaring crowds, pulling even, and sent Palmer out to pitch the finale against the Brewers' Don Sutton. Fans brought brooms to the stadium, anticipating the final scene of one of the Orioles' greatest comebacks. Instead, the Brewers pounded Palmer and won the American League East title 10–2.

=== The start of 2,632 consecutive games ===
For his first full season in Major League Baseball, Cal Ripken Jr. started off slowly, gathered himself, and ended up as the AL Rookie of the Year, hitting .264 with 28 homers and 93 RBIs. After all the debate about where he should play, he started the year at third base, switched to shortstop in July, and never looked back.

On May 29, Ripken sat out of the second game of a double header against the Toronto Blue Jays; little did anyone know that it would be his last missed game for the remainder of this season and the 16 seasons to come. The following day (also against the Blue Jays), his monumental consecutive-games streak got underway.

=== Weaver's farewell ===
After the final out of the loss to the Brewers, an emotional spectacle unfolded at Memorial Stadium. The disappointed sellout crowd rose and started to cheer, and kept cheering for 45 minutes. The Orioles' players left the clubhouse and came back out onto the field to wave, and then Weaver did, too, setting off the biggest roar. The cheers were mostly for him.

Weaver announced in March that the 1982 season would be his last managing the Orioles; he would be retiring afterward and moving to Florida.

=== Roster ===
1982 Baltimore Orioles roster
Roster
| Pitchers: 52 Mike Boddicker; 34,39 Storm Davis; 46 Mike Flanagan; 57 John Flinn; 48 Ross Grimsley; 30 Dennis Martínez; 23 Tippy Martinez; 16 Scott McGregor; 22 Jim Palmer; 26 Don Stanhouse; 53 Sammy Stewart; 49 Tim Stoddard; 51 Don Welchel | Catchers: 24 Rick Dempsey; 17 Joe Nolan; Infielders: 2 Bobby Bonner; 25 Rich Dauer; 11 Glenn Gulliver; 33 Eddie Murray; 9 Floyd Rayford; 8 Cal Ripken Jr.; 12 Lenn Sakata | Outfielders: 27 Benny Ayala; 1 Al Bumbry; 28 Jim Dwyer; 15 Dan Ford; 38 John Lowenstein; 35 Gary Roenicke; 37 John Shelby; 43 Mike Young; Other batters: 10 Terry Crowley; 3 Leo Hernández; 34 José Morales; 29 Ken Singleton | Manager: 4 Earl Weaver; Coaches: 44 Elrod Hendricks; 31 Ray Miller; 47 Cal Ripken; 54 Ralph Rowe; 40 Jimmy Williams |

== Player stats ==
=== Batting ===
==== Starters by position ====
Note: Pos = Position; G = Games played; AB = At bats; H = Hits; Avg. = Batting average; HR = Home runs; RBI = Runs batted in

| Pos | Player | G | AB | H | Avg. | HR | RBI |
|---|---|---|---|---|---|---|---|
| C | Rick Dempsey | 125 | 344 | 88 | .256 | 5 | 36 |
| 1B | Eddie Murray | 151 | 550 | 174 | .316 | 32 | 110 |
| 2B | Rich Dauer | 158 | 558 | 156 | .280 | 8 | 57 |
| 3B | Glenn Gulliver | 50 | 145 | 29 | .200 | 1 | 5 |
| SS | Cal Ripken Jr. | 160 | 598 | 158 | .264 | 28 | 93 |
| LF | John Lowenstein | 122 | 322 | 103 | .320 | 24 | 66 |
| CF | Al Bumbry | 150 | 562 | 147 | .262 | 5 | 40 |
| RF | Dan Ford | 123 | 421 | 99 | .235 | 10 | 43 |
| DH | Ken Singleton | 156 | 561 | 141 | .251 | 14 | 77 |

==== Other batters ====
Note: G = Games played; AB = At bats; H = Hits; Avg. = Batting average; HR = Home runs; RBI = Runs batted in

| Player | G | AB | H | Avg. | HR | RBI |
|---|---|---|---|---|---|---|
| Gary Roenicke | 137 | 393 | 106 | .270 | 21 | 74 |
| Lenn Sakata | 136 | 343 | 89 | .259 | 6 | 31 |
| Joe Nolan | 77 | 219 | 51 | .233 | 6 | 35 |
| Jim Dwyer | 71 | 148 | 45 | .304 | 6 | 15 |
| Benny Ayala | 64 | 128 | 39 | .305 | 6 | 24 |
| Terry Crowley | 65 | 93 | 22 | .237 | 3 | 17 |
| Bobby Bonner | 41 | 77 | 13 | .169 | 0 | 5 |
| Floyd Rayford | 34 | 53 | 7 | .132 | 3 | 5 |
| John Shelby | 26 | 35 | 11 | .314 | 1 | 2 |
| José Morales | 3 | 3 | 0 | .000 | 0 | 0 |
| Mike Young | 6 | 2 | 0 | .000 | 0 | 0 |
| Leo Hernández | 2 | 2 | 0 | .000 | 0 | 0 |

=== Pitching ===
==== Starting pitchers ====
Note: G = Games pitched; IP = Innings pitched; W = Wins; L = Losses; ERA = Earned run average; SO = Strikeouts

| Player | G | IP | W | L | ERA | SO |
|---|---|---|---|---|---|---|
| Dennis Martínez | 40 | 252.0 | 16 | 12 | 4.21 | 111 |
| Mike Flanagan | 36 | 236.0 | 15 | 11 | 3.97 | 103 |
| Jim Palmer | 36 | 227.0 | 15 | 5 | 3.13 | 103 |
| Scott McGregor | 37 | 226.1 | 14 | 12 | 4.61 | 84 |

==== Other pitchers ====
Note: G = Games pitched; IP = Innings pitched; W = Wins; L = Losses; ERA = Earned run average; SO = Strikeouts

| Player | G | IP | W | L | ERA | SO |
|---|---|---|---|---|---|---|
| Sammy Stewart | 38 | 139.0 | 10 | 9 | 4.14 | 69 |
| Storm Davis | 29 | 100.2 | 8 | 4 | 3.49 | 67 |

==== Relief pitchers ====
Note: G = Games pitched; W = Wins; L = Losses; SV = Saves; ERA = Earned run average; SO = Strikeouts

| Player | G | W | L | SV | ERA | SO |
|---|---|---|---|---|---|---|
| Tippy Martinez | 76 | 8 | 8 | 16 | 3.41 | 78 |
| Tim Stoddard | 50 | 3 | 4 | 12 | 4.02 | 42 |
| Ross Grimsley | 21 | 1 | 2 | 0 | 5.25 | 18 |
| Don Stanhouse | 17 | 0 | 1 | 0 | 5.40 | 8 |
| Mike Boddicker | 7 | 1 | 0 | 0 | 3.51 | 20 |
| John Flinn | 5 | 2 | 0 | 0 | 1.32 | 13 |
| Don Welchel | 2 | 1 | 0 | 0 | 8.31 | 3 |

== Awards and honors ==
- Cal Ripken Jr., American League Rookie of the Year
- Ken Singleton, Roberto Clemente Award

All-Star Game

- Eddie Murray

== Farm system ==
| Level | Team | League | Manager |
|---|---|---|---|
| AAA | Rochester Red Wings | International League | Lance Nichols |
| AA | Charlotte O's | Southern League | Mark Wiley |
| A | Hagerstown Suns | Carolina League | Grady Little |
| Rookie | Bluefield Orioles | Appalachian League | John Hart |

LEAGUE CHAMPIONS: Bluefield
