= 1983 Chicago White Sox season =

1983 Chicago White Sox
- American League West champions
- League: American League
- Division: West
- Ballpark: Comiskey Park
- City: Chicago
- Record: 99–63 (.611)
- Divisional place: 1st
- Owners: Jerry Reinsdorf
- General managers: Roland Hemond
- Managers: Tony La Russa
- Television: WFLD–TV 32; Sportsvision (Don Drysdale, Early Wynn, Ken Harrelson, Lorn Brown, Joe McConnell, Ken Wilson)
- Radio: WMAQ–AM 670 (Early Wynn, Joe McConnell, Lorn Brown)

The 1983 Chicago White Sox season was a season in American baseball. It involved the White Sox winning the American League West championship on September 17. It marked their first postseason appearance since the 1959 World Series. It was the city of Chicago's first baseball championship of any kind (division, league, or world), since the White Sox themselves reached the World Series twenty-four years earlier.

After the White Sox went through a winning streak around the All-Star break, Texas Rangers manager Doug Rader said the White Sox "...weren't playing well. They're winning ugly." This phrase became a rallying cry for the team, and they are often referred to as the "winning ugly" team (and their uniforms as the "winning ugly" uniforms).

== Offseason ==
- October 12, 1982: Sparky Lyle was released by the White Sox.
- November 10, 1982: Casey Parsons was signed as a free agent by the White Sox.
- January 11, 1983: Damon Berryhill was drafted by the White Sox in the 13th round of the 1983 Major League Baseball draft, but did not sign.
- January 25, 1983: Steve Trout and Warren Brusstar were traded by the White Sox to the Chicago Cubs for Scott Fletcher, Pat Tabler, Randy Martz, and Dick Tidrow.

== Regular season ==
Ron Kittle won the American League Rookie of the Year Award and set a club record for most home runs by a rookie. He missed the American League home run title by 3 home runs and finished third in the league. He would rank in ninth place in the American League for runs batted in. Kittle would manage to lead the league in strikeouts with 150.

LaMarr Hoyt won the American League Cy Young Award while fellow pitcher Floyd Bannister finished second in the American League in strikeouts. He also won 13 of 14 games after the All-Star Break.

Tony LaRussa was named American League Manager of the Year.

=== Opening Day lineup ===
- Rudy Law, CF
- Tony Bernazard, 2B
- Harold Baines, RF
- Greg Luzinski, DH
- Greg Walker, 1B
- Tom Paciorek, LF
- Carlton Fisk, C
- Vance Law, 3B
- Scott Fletcher, SS
- LaMarr Hoyt, P

=== Season standings ===
AL West
Team	W	L	Pct.	GB	Home	Road
Chicago White Sox	99	63	.611	—	55‍–‍26	44‍–‍37
Kansas City Royals	79	83	.488	20	45‍–‍36	34‍–‍47
Texas Rangers	77	85	.475	22	44‍–‍37	33‍–‍48
Oakland Athletics	74	88	.457	25	42‍–‍39	32‍–‍49
California Angels	70	92	.432	29	35‍–‍46	35‍–‍46
Minnesota Twins	70	92	.432	29	37‍–‍44	33‍–‍48
Seattle Mariners	60	102	.370	39	30‍–‍51	30‍–‍51

=== Record vs. opponents ===
1983 American League record Sources:
Team	BAL	BOS	CAL	CWS	CLE	DET	KC	MIL	MIN	NYY	OAK	SEA	TEX	TOR
Baltimore	—	8–5	7–5	7–5	6–7	5–8	8–4	11–2	8–4	6–7	8–4	8–4	9–3	7–6
Boston	5–8	—	6–6	6–6	7–6	4–9	5–7	4–9	5–7	7–6	8–4	7–5	7–5	7–6
California	5–7	6–6	—	3–10	8–4	4–8	6–7	6–6	6–7	5–7	5–8	6–7	6–7	4–8
Chicago	5–7	6–6	10–3	—	8–4	8–4	9–4	4–8	8–5	8–4	8–5	12–1	8–5	5–7
Cleveland	7–6	6–7	4–8	4–8	—	5–8	7–5	3–10	6–6	6–7	7–5	8–4	3–9	4–9
Detroit	8–5	9–4	8–4	4–8	8–5	—	7–5	6–7	9–3	5–8	6–6	8–4	8–4	6–7
Kansas City	4–8	7–5	7–6	4–9	5–7	5–7	—	6–6	6–7	6–6	7–6	8–5	8–5–1	6–6
Milwaukee	2–11	9–4	6–6	8–4	10–3	7–6	6–6	—	8–4	4–9	6–6	5–7	8–4	8–5
Minnesota	4–8	7–5	7–6	5–8	6–6	3–9	7–6	4–8	—	4–8	4–9	9–4	5–8	5–7
New York	7–6	6–7	7–5	4–8	7–6	8–5	6–6	9–4	8–4	—	8–4	7–5	7–5	7–6
Oakland	4–8	4–8	8–5	5–8	5–7	6–6	6–7	6–6	9–4	4–8	—	9–4	2–11	6–6
Seattle	4–8	5–7	7–6	1–12	4–8	4–8	5–8	7–5	4–9	5–7	4–9	—	6–7	4–8
Texas	3–9	5–7	7–6	5–8	9–3	4–8	5–8–1	4–8	8–5	5–7	11–2	7–6	—	4–8
Toronto	6–7	6–7	8–4	7–5	9–4	7–6	6–6	5–8	7–5	6–7	6–6	8–4	8–4	—

=== Notable transactions ===
- April 1, 1983: Pat Tabler was traded by the White Sox to the Cleveland Indians for Jerry Dybzinski.
- June 6, 1983: Doug Drabek was drafted by the White Sox in the 11th round of the 1983 amateur draft. Player signed June 11, 1983.
- August 31, 1983: Aurelio Rodriguez was signed as a free agent with the Chicago White Sox.

=== Roster ===
1983 Chicago White Sox
Roster
Pitchers: 50 Juan Agosto; 24 Floyd Bannister; 30 Salomé Barojas; 40 Britt Burns; 34 Richard Dotson; 45 Kevin Hickey; 47 Guy Hoffman; 31 LaMarr Hoyt; 49 Al Jones; 67 Jim Kern; 36 Jerry Koosman; 53 Dennis Lamp; 33 Randy Martz; 43 Steve Mura; 41 Dick Tidrow	Catchers: 72 Carlton Fisk; 7 Marc Hill; 12 Joel Skinner; Infielders: 14 Tony Bernazard; 16 Julio Cruz; 20 Jerry Dybzinski; 1,46 Scott Fletcher; 27 Lorenzo Gray; 32 Tim Hulett; 5 Vance Law; 23 Chris Nyman; 44 Tom Paciorek; 22 Aurelio Rodríguez; 25 Mike Squires; 29 Greg Walker	Outfielders: 3 Harold Baines; 28 Miguel Diloné; 17 Jerry Hairston; 42 Ron Kittle; 47 Rusty Kuntz; 11 Rudy Law; 14 Casey Parsons; 25 Dave Stegman; Other batters: 19 Greg Luzinski	Manager: 10 Tony La Russa; Coaches: 35 Ed Brinkman (Bench/infield); 18 Dave Duncan (Pitching); 15 Art Kusnyer (Bullpen); 6 Charley Lau (Hitting); 21 Jim Leyland (Third base); 38 Dave Nelson (First base)

== Game log ==
=== Regular season ===
Legend
	White Sox win
	White Sox loss
	Postponement
	Clinched division
**Bold**	White Sox team member

1983 regular season game log: 99–63 (Home: 55–26; Away: 44–37)
April: 8–10 (Home: 4–3; Away: 4–7)

#	Date	Time (CT)	Opponent	Score	Win	Loss	Save	Time of Game	Attendance	Record	Box/ Streak
6	April 12	1:15 p.m. CST	Orioles	L 8–10	Stewart (1–1)	**Lamp** (1–1)	—	3:09	38,306	2–4	L1
7	April 14	1:15 p.m. CST	Orioles	**W** 12–11	**Barojas** (1–0)	Welchel (0–1)	**Hickey** (2)	3:56	13,622	3–4	W1

May: 12–15 (Home: 8–7; Away: 4–8)

#	Date	Time (CT)	Opponent	Score	Win	Loss	Save	Time of Game	Attendance	Record	Box/ Streak
—	May 16	6:35 p.m. CDT	@ Orioles	**Postponed (Rain)** (Makeup date: May 17)							
31 (1)	May 17	4:35 p.m. CDT	@ Orioles	L 2–7	Stoddard (2–0)	**Hoyt** (2–6)	—	2:36	—	13–18	L1
32 (2)	May 17	7:41 p.m. CDT	@ Orioles	L 0–5	Boddicker (1–0)	**Lamp** (3–3)	—	2:24	14,314	13–19	L2
33	May 18	6:35 p.m. CDT	@ Orioles	L 0–1	T Martinez (2–1)	**Dotson** (4–4)	—	2:21	12,582	13–20	L3

June: 18–10 (Home: 12–5; Away: 6–7)

#	Date	Time (CT)	Opponent	Score	Win	Loss	Save	Time of Game	Attendance	Record	Box/ Streak

July: 15–13 (Home: 7–6; Away: 8–7)

#	Date	Time (CT)	Opponent	Score	Win	Loss	Save	Time of Game	Attendance	Record	Box/ Streak
—	July 6	7:40 p.m. CDT	**54th All-Star Game in Chicago, IL**								

August: 22–9 (Home: 10–4; Away: 12–5)

#	Date	Time (CT)	Opponent	Score	Win	Loss	Save	Time of Game	Attendance	Record	Box/ Streak
106	August 5	6:35 p.m. CDT	@ Orioles	L 4–5	Boddicker (8–5)	**Lamp** (5–7)	—	3:16	39,544	56–50	L1
107	August 6	6:35 p.m. CDT	@ Orioles	**W** 6–4	**Bannister** (9–9)	D Martínez (6–14)	**Barojas** (10)	3:26	32,769	57–50	W1
108	August 7	1:05 p.m. CDT	@ Orioles	**W** 4–3	**Hoyt** (14–10)	Flanagan (6–1)	**Lamp** (8)	2:27	24,384	58–50	W2
112	August 11	7:30 p.m. CDT	Orioles	**W** 9–3	**Bannister** (10–9)	Ramirez (4–3)	—	3:34	31,810	61–51	W2
113	August 12	7:30 p.m. CDT	Orioles	**W** 2–1	**Hoyt** (15–10)	Flanagan (6–2)	—	2:41	45,588	62–51	W3
114	August 13	7:30 p.m. CDT	Orioles	L 2–5	Stewart (5–3)	**Koosman** (8–5)	T Martinez (12)	2:27	36,323	62–52	L1
115	August 14	1:15 p.m. CDT	Orioles	L 1–2	McGregor (15–5)	**Dotson** (12–7)	Stoddard (5)	2:51	37,846	62–53	L2

September: 22–6 (Home: 14–1; Away: 8–5)

#	Date	Time (CT)	Opponent	Score	Win	Loss	Save	Time of Game	Attendance	Record	Box/ Streak

October: 2–0 (Home: 0–0; Away: 2–0)

#	Date	Time (CT)	Opponent	Score	Win	Loss	Save	Time of Game	Attendance	Record	Box/ Streak

=== Detailed records ===
American League
Opponent	W	L	WP	RS	RA
AL East
Baltimore Orioles	5	7	0.417	50	57
Boston Red Sox
Cleveland Indians
Detroit Tigers	8	4	0.667	50	55
Milwaukee Brewers
New York Yankees
Toronto Blue Jays
Div Total	13	11	0.542	100	112
AL West
California Angels
**Chicago White Sox**					
Kansas City Royals	9	4	0.692	71	53
Minnesota Twins
Oakland Athletics
Seattle Mariners
Texas Rangers
Div Total	9	4	0.692	71	53
Season Total	22	15	0.595	171	165

Month	Games	Won	Lost	Win %	RS	RA
April	7	5	2	0.714	42	37
May	6	2	4	0.333	26	30
June	5	3	2	0.600	19	19
July
August	18	11	7	0.611	72	79
September	1	1	0	1.000	12	0
October
Total	37	22	15	0.595	171	165

	Games	Won	Lost	Win %	RS	RA
Home	19	12	7	0.632	85	75
Away	18	10	8	0.556	86	90
Total	37	22	15	0.595	171	165

=== Postseason Game log ===
Legend
	White Sox win
	White Sox loss
**Bold**	White Sox team member

1983 Postseason game log: 1–3 (Home: 0–2; Away: 1–1)
AL Championship Series vs. Baltimore Orioles 1–3 (Home: 0–2; Away: 1–1)

#	Date	Time (CT)	Opponent	Score	Win	Loss	Save	Time of Game	Attendance	Series	Box/ Streak
1	October 5	2:05 p.m. CDT	@ Orioles	**W** 2–1	**Hoyt** (1–0)	McGregor (0–1)	—	2:38	51,289	CHA 1–0	W1
2	October 6	7:20 p.m. CDT	@ Orioles	L 0–4	Boddicker (1–0)	**Bannister** (0–1)	—	2:51	52,347	Tied 1–1	L1
3	October 7	7:20 p.m. CDT	Orioles	L 1–11	Flanagan (1–0)	**Dotson** (0–1)	Stewart (1)	2:58	46,635	BAL 2–1	L2
4	October 8	12:05 p.m. CDT	Orioles	L 0–3 (10)	T Martinez (1–0)	**Burns** (0–1)	—	3:41	45,477	BAL 3–1	L3

== All-Star game ==
The 54th playing of the midsummer classic between the all-stars of the American League (AL) and National League (NL) was held on July 6, 1983, at Comiskey Park. The game resulted in the American League defeating the National League 13–3. The game occurred exactly 50 years to the date of the first All-Star game. The game is best remembered for Fred Lynn's third-inning grand slam off of San Francisco's Atlee Hammaker. As of 2024, it is the only grand slam in All-Star Game history.

== Player stats ==
= Indicates team leader

=== Batting ===
Note: G = Games played; AB = At bats; R = Runs scored; H = Hits; 2B = Doubles; 3B = Triples; HR = Home runs; RBI = Runs batted in; BB = Base on balls; SO = Strikeouts; AVG = Batting average; SB = Stolen bases

Player	G	AB	R	H	2B	3B	HR	RBI	BB	SO	AVG	SB
Harold Baines, RF, CF	156	596	76	167	33	2	20	99	49	85	.280	7
Tony Bernazard, 2B	59	233	30	61	16	2	2	26	17	45	.262	2
Julio Cruz, 2B	99	334	47	84	9	4	1	40	29	44	.251	24
Miguel Diloné, CF	4	3	1	0	0	0	0	0	0	0	.000	1
Jerry Dybzinski, SS	127	256	30	59	10	1	1	32	18	29	.230	11
Carlton Fisk, C	138	488	85	141	26	4	26	86	46	88	.289	9
Scott Fletcher, SS, 2B	114	262	42	62	16	5	3	31	29	22	.237	5
Lorenzo Gray, 3B	41	78	18	14	3	0	1	4	8	16	.179	1
Jerry Hairston, OF, DH	101	126	17	37	9	1	5	22	23	16	.294	0
Marc Hill, C	58	133	11	30	6	0	1	11	9	24	.226	0
Tim Hulett, 2B	6	5	0	1	0	0	0	0	0	0	.200	1
Ron Kittle, LF	145	520	75	132	19	3	35	100	39	150	.254	8
Rusty Kuntz, CF	28	42	6	11	1	0	0	1	6	13	.262	1
Rudy Law, CF	141	501	95	142	20	7	3	34	42	36	.283	77
Vance Law, 3B	145	408	55	99	21	5	4	42	51	56	.243	3
Greg Luzinski, DH	144	502	73	128	26	1	32	95	70	117	.255	2
Chris Nyman, 1B, DH	21	28	12	8	0	0	2	4	4	7	.286	2
Tom Paciorek, 1B, OF	115	420	65	129	32	3	9	63	25	58	.307	6
Casey Parsons, OF	8	5	1	1	0	0	0	0	2	1	.200	0
Aurelio Rodriguez, 3B	22	20	1	4	1	0	1	1	0	3	.200	0
Joel Skinner, C	6	11	2	3	0	0	0	1	0	1	.273	0
Mike Squires, 1B	143	153	21	34	4	1	1	11	22	11	.222	3
Dave Stegman, OF	30	53	5	9	2	0	0	4	10	9	.170	0
Greg Walker, 1B, DH	118	307	32	83	16	3	10	55	58	57	.270	2
Team totals	162	5484	800	1439	270	42	157	762	527	888	.262	165

=== Pitching ===
Note: W = Wins; L = Losses; ERA = Earned run average; G = Games pitched; GS = Games started; SV = Saves; IP = Innings pitched; H = Hits allowed; R = Runs allowed; ER = Earned runs allowed; HR = Home runs allowed; BB = Walks allowed; K = Strikeouts

Player	W	L	ERA	G	GS	SV	IP	H	R	ER	HR	BB	K
Juan Agosto	2	2	4.10	39	0	7	41.2	41	20	19	2	12	29
Floyd Bannister	16	10	3.35	34	34	0	217.1	191	88	81	19	74	193
Salome Barojas	3	3	2.47	52	0	12	87.1	70	24	24	2	34	38
Britt Burns	10	11	3.58	29	26	0	173.2	165	79	69	14	57	115
Richard Dotson	22	7	3.23	35	35	0	240.0	209	92	86	19	107	137
Kevin Hickey	1	2	5.23	23	0	5	20.2	23	14	12	5	13	8
Guy Hoffman	1	0	7.50	11	0	0	6.0	14	5	5	1	2	2
LaMarr Hoyt	24	10	3.66	36	36	0	260.2	236	115	106	27	35	148
Al Jones	0	0	3.86	2	0	0	2.1	3	1	1	0	2	2
Jim Kern	0	0	0.00	1	0	0	0.2	1	1	0	0	0	0
Jerry Koosman	11	7	4.77	37	24	2	169.2	176	96	90	19	55	90
Dennis Lamp	7	7	3.71	49	5	15	116.1	123	52	48	6	36	44
Randy Martz	0	0	3.60	1	1	0	5.0	4	2	2	0	4	1
Steve Mura	0	0	4.38	6	0	0	12.1	13	11	6	1	6	4
Dick Tidrow	2	4	4.22	50	1	7	91.2	86	50	43	13	42	66
Team totals	99	63	3.67	162	162	48	1445.1	1355	650	589	128	479	877

== American League Championship Series ==
=== Summary ===
Game	Score	Date	Location	Attendance
1	Chicago – 2, Baltimore – 1	October 5	Memorial Stadium	51,289
2	Chicago – 0, Baltimore – 4	October 6	Memorial Stadium	52,347
3	Baltimore – 11, Chicago – 1	October 7	Comiskey Park	46,635
4	Baltimore – 3, Chicago – 0	October 8	Comiskey Park	45,477

==== Game One ====
October 5, Memorial Stadium

Team	1	2	3	4	5	6	7	8	9	R	H	E
Chicago	0	0	1	0	0	1	0	0	0	2	7	0
Baltimore	0	0	0	0	0	0	0	0	1	1	5	1
W: LaMarr Hoyt (1–0) L: Scott McGregor (0–1)
HRs: None

Playing in their first postseason game since the 1959 World Series, the White Sox jumped out to a 1–0 series lead behind a complete-game victory by Hoyt, the American League Cy Young Award winner.

==== Game Two ====
October 6, Memorial Stadium

Team	1	2	3	4	5	6	7	8	9	R	H	E
Chicago	0	0	0	0	0	0	0	0	0	0	5	2
Baltimore	0	1	0	1	0	2	0	0	X	4	6	0
W: Mike Boddicker (1–0) L: Floyd Bannister (0–1)
HRs: BAL – Gary Roenicke (1)

==== Game Three ====
October 7, Comiskey Park

Team	1	2	3	4	5	6	7	8	9	R	H	E
Baltimore	3	1	0	0	2	0	0	1	4	11	8	1
Chicago	0	1	0	0	0	0	0	0	0	1	6	1
W: Mike Flanagan (1–0) L: Richard Dotson (0–1) SV: Sammy Stewart (1)
HRs: BAL – Eddie Murray (1)

==== Game Four ====
October 8, Comiskey Park

Team	1	2	3	4	5	6	7	8	9	10	R	H	E
Baltimore	0	0	0	0	0	0	0	0	0	3	3	9	0
Chicago	0	0	0	0	0	0	0	0	0	0	0	10	0
W: Tippy Martinez (1–0) L: Britt Burns (0–1)
HRs: BAL – Tito Landrum (1)

== Award winners ==
- LaMarr Hoyt, American League Cy Young Award
- Ron Kittle, American League Rookie of the Year Award
- Tony La Russa, American League Manager of the Year Award
- Tony La Russa, Associated Press AL Manager of the Year
- Roland Hemond, Executive of the Year

All-Star Game

- Ron Kittle, reserve

== Farm system ==
Level	Team	League	Manager
AAA	Denver Bears	American Association	Jim Mahoney
AA	Glens Falls White Sox	Eastern League	Adrian Garrett
A	Appleton Foxes	Midwest League	John Boles
A-Short Season	Niagara Falls Sox	New York–Penn League	Fred Nelson
Rookie	GCL White Sox	Gulf Coast League	Steve Dillard

LEAGUE CHAMPIONS: Denver, Appleton
