= 1983 Kansas City Royals season =

1983 Kansas City Royals
- League: American League
- Division: West
- Ballpark: Royals Stadium
- City: Kansas City, Missouri
- Record: 79–83 (.488)
- Divisional place: 2nd
- Owners: Ewing Kauffman
- General managers: John Schuerholz
- Managers: Dick Howser
- Television: WDAF-TV (Denny Matthews, Denny Trease, Fred White)
- Radio: WIBW (AM) (Denny Matthews, Fred White)

The 1983 Kansas City Royals season was their 15th in Major League Baseball. The Royals finished second in the American League West at 79–83, 20 games behind the Chicago White Sox. Dan Quisenberry's league-leading 45 saves also set a single-season franchise record.

== Offseason ==
- December 8, 1982: Tim Ireland was released by the Royals.
- February 5, 1983: Cecil Fielder was traded by the Royals to the Toronto Blue Jays for Leon Roberts.

== Regular season ==
- April 20, 1983: George Brett had 7 RBI in one game versus the Detroit Tigers.

=== Season standings ===
AL West
Team	W	L	Pct.	GB	Home	Road
Chicago White Sox	99	63	.611	—	55‍–‍26	44‍–‍37
Kansas City Royals	79	83	.488	20	45‍–‍36	34‍–‍47
Texas Rangers	77	85	.475	22	44‍–‍37	33‍–‍48
Oakland Athletics	74	88	.457	25	42‍–‍39	32‍–‍49
California Angels	70	92	.432	29	35‍–‍46	35‍–‍46
Minnesota Twins	70	92	.432	29	37‍–‍44	33‍–‍48
Seattle Mariners	60	102	.370	39	30‍–‍51	30‍–‍51

=== Record vs. opponents ===
1983 American League record Sources:
Team	BAL	BOS	CAL	CWS	CLE	DET	KC	MIL	MIN	NYY	OAK	SEA	TEX	TOR
Baltimore	—	8–5	7–5	7–5	6–7	5–8	8–4	11–2	8–4	6–7	8–4	8–4	9–3	7–6
Boston	5–8	—	6–6	6–6	7–6	4–9	5–7	4–9	5–7	7–6	8–4	7–5	7–5	7–6
California	5–7	6–6	—	3–10	8–4	4–8	6–7	6–6	6–7	5–7	5–8	6–7	6–7	4–8
Chicago	5–7	6–6	10–3	—	8–4	8–4	9–4	4–8	8–5	8–4	8–5	12–1	8–5	5–7
Cleveland	7–6	6–7	4–8	4–8	—	5–8	7–5	3–10	6–6	6–7	7–5	8–4	3–9	4–9
Detroit	8–5	9–4	8–4	4–8	8–5	—	7–5	6–7	9–3	5–8	6–6	8–4	8–4	6–7
Kansas City	4–8	7–5	7–6	4–9	5–7	5–7	—	6–6	6–7	6–6	7–6	8–5	8–5–1	6–6
Milwaukee	2–11	9–4	6–6	8–4	10–3	7–6	6–6	—	8–4	4–9	6–6	5–7	8–4	8–5
Minnesota	4–8	7–5	7–6	5–8	6–6	3–9	7–6	4–8	—	4–8	4–9	9–4	5–8	5–7
New York	7–6	6–7	7–5	4–8	7–6	8–5	6–6	9–4	8–4	—	8–4	7–5	7–5	7–6
Oakland	4–8	4–8	8–5	5–8	5–7	6–6	6–7	6–6	9–4	4–8	—	9–4	2–11	6–6
Seattle	4–8	5–7	7–6	1–12	4–8	4–8	5–8	7–5	4–9	5–7	4–9	—	6–7	4–8
Texas	3–9	5–7	7–6	5–8	9–3	4–8	5–8–1	4–8	8–5	5–7	11–2	7–6	—	4–8
Toronto	6–7	6–7	8–4	7–5	9–4	7–6	6–6	5–8	7–5	6–7	6–6	8–4	8–4	—

=== Notable transactions ===
- April 1, 1983: Bombo Rivera was released by the Royals.
- July 6, 1983: Gaylord Perry was signed as a free agent by the Royals.
- July 22, 1983: Mélido Pérez was signed as an amateur free agent by the Royals.
- August 2, 1983: Eric Rasmussen was purchased by the Royals from the St. Louis Cardinals.
- August 5, 1983: Vida Blue was released by the Royals.

=== Pine Tar Game ===
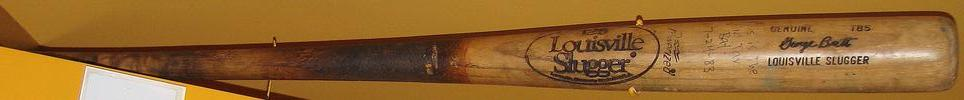
The baseball bat used by Kansas City Royals third baseman George Brett in the Pine Tar Incident on July 24, 1983.

The Pine Tar Game refers to a controversial incident that took place in an American League baseball game played between the Kansas City Royals and New York Yankees on July 24, 1983.

Playing at New York's Yankee Stadium, the Royals were trailing 4–3 with two outs in the top of the ninth and U L Washington on first base. In the on deck circle, George Brett was heard remarking to a teammate, "Watch this baby fly" as he shook his bat. He then came to the plate and connected off Yankee reliever Rich "Goose" Gossage for a two-run home run and a 5–4 lead. As Brett crossed the plate, New York manager Billy Martin approached home plate umpire Tim McClelland and requested that Brett's bat be examined. Earlier in the season, Martin and other members (most notably, third baseman Graig Nettles, who as a member of the Minnesota Twins, recalled a similar incident involving Thurman Munson) of the Yankees had noticed the amount of pine tar used by Brett, but Martin had chosen not to say anything until the home run.

With Brett watching from the dugout, McClelland and the rest of the umpiring crew inspected the bat. Measuring the bat against the width of home plate (which is 17 inches), they determined that the amount of pine tar on the bat's handle exceeded that allowed by Rule 1.10(b) of the Major League Baseball rule book, which read that "a bat may not be covered by such a substance more than 18 inches (460 mm) from the tip of the handle." Brett was called out, which nullified the home run and ended the game, giving the Yankees a 4–3 victory; a Royals protest immediately after the game was successful, reversing McClelland's out call, restoring the home run, and forcing the teams to play the final four outs at a future date.

=== Roster ===
1983 Kansas City Royals roster
Roster
Pitchers: 31 Mike Armstrong; 40 Bud Black; 14,33 Vida Blue; 39 Bill Castro; 21 Keith Creel; 32 Larry Gura; 48 Don Hood; 38 Mark Huismann; 45 Danny Jackson; 22 Dennis Leonard; 36 Gaylord Perry; 29 Dan Quisenberry; 28 Eric Rasmussen; 18 Steve Renko; 34 Paul Splittorff; 36 Bob Tufts; 19 Frank Wills	Catchers: 7 Don Slaught; 12 John Wathan; Infielders: 24 Willie Aikens; 1 Buddy Biancalana; 5 George Brett; 2 Onix Concepción; 35 Ron Johnson; 3 Cliff Pastornicky; 4 Greg Pryor; 9 Joe Simpson; 30 U L Washington; 20 Frank White	Outfielders: 33 Butch Davis; 23 César Gerónimo; 25 Jerry Martin; 49 Darryl Motley; 26 Amos Otis; 16 Leon Roberts; 15 Pat Sheridan; 6 Willie Wilson; Other batters: 11 Hal McRae	Manager: 10 Dick Howser; Coaches: 43 Cloyd Boyer; 8 Rocky Colavito; 42 José Martínez; 41 Joe Nossek; 44 Jimmie Schaffer

== Player stats ==
=== Batting ===
==== Starters by position ====
Note: Pos = Position; G = Games played; AB = At bats; H = Hits; Avg. = Batting average; HR = Home runs; RBI = Runs batted in

Pos	Player	G	AB	H	Avg.	HR	RBI
C	John Wathan	128	437	107	.245	2	32
1B	Willie Aikens	125	410	124	.302	23	72
2B	Frank White	146	549	143	.260	11	77
SS	UL Washington	144	547	129	.236	5	41
3B	George Brett	123	464	144	.310	25	93
LF	Butch Davis	33	122	42	.344	2	18
CF	Willie Wilson	137	576	159	.276	2	33
RF	Amos Otis	98	356	93	.261	4	41
DH	Hal McRae	157	589	183	.311	12	82

==== Other batters ====
Note: G = Games played; AB = At bats; H = Hits; Avg. = Batting average; HR = Home runs; RBI = Runs batted in

Player	G	AB	H	Avg.	HR	RBI
Pat Sheridan	109	333	90	.270	7	36
Don Slaught	83	276	86	.312	0	28
Onix Concepción	80	219	53	.242	0	20
Leon Roberts	84	213	55	.258	8	24
Joe Simpson	89	119	20	.168	0	8
Greg Pryor	68	115	25	.217	1	14
César Gerónimo	38	87	18	.207	0	4
Darryl Motley	19	68	16	.235	3	11
Jerry Martin	13	44	14	.318	2	13
Cliff Pastornicky	10	32	4	.125	2	5
Ron Johnson	9	27	7	.259	0	1
Buddy Biancalana	6	15	3	.200	0	0

=== Pitching ===
==== Starting pitchers ====
Note: G = Games pitched; IP = Innings pitched; W = Wins; L = Losses; ERA = Earned run average; SO = Strikeouts

Player	G	IP	W	L	ERA	SO
Larry Gura	34	200.1	11	18	4.90	57
Bud Black	24	161.1	10	7	3.79	58
Paul Splittorff	27	156.0	13	8	3.63	61
Gaylord Perry	14	84.1	4	4	4.27	40
Dennis Leonard	10	63.0	6	3	3.71	31
Eric Rasmussen	11	52.2	3	6	4.78	18
Frank Wills	6	34.2	2	1	4.15	23
Danny Jackson	4	19.0	1	1	5.21	9

==== Other pitchers ====
Note: G = Games pitched; IP = Innings pitched; W = Wins; L = Losses; ERA = Earned run average; SO = Strikeouts

Player	G	IP	W	L	ERA	SO
Steve Renko	25	121.1	6	11	4.30	54
Keith Creel	25	89.1	2	5	6.35	31
Vida Blue	19	85.1	0	5	6.01	53

==== Relief pitchers ====
Note: G = Games pitched; W = Wins; L = Losses; SV = Saves; ERA = Earned run average; SO = Strikeouts

Player	G	W	L	SV	ERA	SO
Dan Quisenberry	69	5	3	45	1.94	48
Mike Armstrong	58	10	7	3	3.86	52
Don Hood	27	2	3	0	2.27	17
Bill Castro	18	2	0	0	6.64	17
Mark Huismann	13	2	1	0	5.58	20
Bob Tufts	6	0	0	0	8.10	3
Joe Simpson	2	0	0	0	3.00	1

== Farm system ==
Level	Team	League	Manager
AAA	Omaha Royals	American Association	Joe Sparks
AA	Jacksonville Suns	Southern League	Gene Lamont
A	Fort Myers Royals	Florida State League	Rick Mathews
A	Charleston Royals	South Atlantic League	Roy Tanner
Rookie	GCL Royals	Gulf Coast League	Joe Jones
Rookie	Butte Copper Kings	Pioneer League	Tommy Jones
