= 1983 Boston Red Sox season =

Major League Baseball season

1983 Boston Red Sox
- League: American League
- Division: East
- Ballpark: Fenway Park
- City: Boston
- Record: 78–84 (.481)
- Divisional place: 6th
- Owners: Buddy LeRoux, Haywood Sullivan, Jean Yawkey
- President: Jean Yawkey
- General manager: Haywood Sullivan
- Manager: Ralph Houk
- Television: WSBK-TV, Ch. 38 (Ned Martin, Bob Montgomery)
- Radio: WPLM-FM 99.1; WPLM-AM 1390 (Ken Coleman, Joe Castiglione)
- Stats: ESPN.com; Baseball Reference

The 1983 Boston Red Sox season was the 83rd season in the franchise's Major League Baseball history. The Red Sox finished sixth in the American League East with a record of 78 wins and 84 losses, 20 games behind the Baltimore Orioles, who went on to win the 1983 World Series. It was the Red Sox' first losing season since 1966.

On June 6, general partner Buddy LeRoux attempted to replace general manager Haywood Sullivan with former general manager Dick O'Connell, leading to protracted legal proceedings between LeRoux and the team's other two general partners, Sullivan and Jean Yawkey. LeRoux ultimately lost in court the following June.

== Offseason ==
- November 1, 1982: Tony Pérez was released by the Red Sox.
- December 6, 1982: Carney Lansford‚ Garry Hancock‚ and a minor leaguer (Jerry King) were traded by the Red Sox to the Oakland Athletics for Tony Armas and Jeff Newman.
- January 10, 1983: Josías Manzanillo was signed as an amateur free agent by the Red Sox.
- January 11, 1983: Ellis Burks was drafted by the Red Sox in the 1st round of the January portion of the 1983 Major League Baseball draft. Burks signed on May 17.
- January 13, 1983: Mike Torrez was traded by the Red Sox to the New York Mets for a player to be named later. The Mets completed the deal by sending Mike Davis (minors) to the Red Sox on February 15.
- March 25, 1983: Brian Kingman was released by the Red Sox.

== Regular season ==
Record by month
Month	Record		Cumulative		AL East		Ref.
Month	Won	Lost	Won	Lost	Position	GB	Ref.
April	10	9	10	9	2nd (tie)	1/2	
May	16	11	26	20	2nd	1/2	
June	11	16	37	36	5th	5	
July	14	14	51	50	6th	9	
August	12	19	63	69	6th	15 1/2	
September	14	14	77	83	6th	20	
October	1	1	78	84	6th	20	

=== Highlights ===
- Jim Rice led the American League in home runs (39) and total bases (344), and tied for the lead in RBIs (126) while hitting for a .305 batting average.
- Wade Boggs led American League hitters with a .361 average and a .444 on-base percentage, finishing second in hits (210) and doubles (44).
- Tony Armas may not have had enough hits to keep his average up (.218), but finished second in the league with 36 home runs and seventh with 107 RBI.
- Carl Yastrzemski retired after 23 seasons, all with the Red Sox, one of the longest careers with one franchise in MLB history.

=== Season standings ===
AL East
Team	W	L	Pct.	GB	Home	Road
Baltimore Orioles	98	64	.605	—	50‍–‍31	48‍–‍33
Detroit Tigers	92	70	.568	6	48‍–‍33	44‍–‍37
New York Yankees	91	71	.562	7	51‍–‍30	40‍–‍41
Toronto Blue Jays	89	73	.549	9	48‍–‍33	41‍–‍40
Milwaukee Brewers	87	75	.537	11	52‍–‍29	35‍–‍46
Boston Red Sox	78	84	.481	20	38‍–‍43	40‍–‍41
Cleveland Indians	70	92	.432	28	36‍–‍45	34‍–‍47

=== Record vs. opponents ===
1983 American League record Sources:
Team	BAL	BOS	CAL	CWS	CLE	DET	KC	MIL	MIN	NYY	OAK	SEA	TEX	TOR
Baltimore	—	8–5	7–5	7–5	6–7	5–8	8–4	11–2	8–4	6–7	8–4	8–4	9–3	7–6
Boston	5–8	—	6–6	6–6	7–6	4–9	5–7	4–9	5–7	7–6	8–4	7–5	7–5	7–6
California	5–7	6–6	—	3–10	8–4	4–8	6–7	6–6	6–7	5–7	5–8	6–7	6–7	4–8
Chicago	5–7	6–6	10–3	—	8–4	8–4	9–4	4–8	8–5	8–4	8–5	12–1	8–5	5–7
Cleveland	7–6	6–7	4–8	4–8	—	5–8	7–5	3–10	6–6	6–7	7–5	8–4	3–9	4–9
Detroit	8–5	9–4	8–4	4–8	8–5	—	7–5	6–7	9–3	5–8	6–6	8–4	8–4	6–7
Kansas City	4–8	7–5	7–6	4–9	5–7	5–7	—	6–6	6–7	6–6	7–6	8–5	8–5–1	6–6
Milwaukee	2–11	9–4	6–6	8–4	10–3	7–6	6–6	—	8–4	4–9	6–6	5–7	8–4	8–5
Minnesota	4–8	7–5	7–6	5–8	6–6	3–9	7–6	4–8	—	4–8	4–9	9–4	5–8	5–7
New York	7–6	6–7	7–5	4–8	7–6	8–5	6–6	9–4	8–4	—	8–4	7–5	7–5	7–6
Oakland	4–8	4–8	8–5	5–8	5–7	6–6	6–7	6–6	9–4	4–8	—	9–4	2–11	6–6
Seattle	4–8	5–7	7–6	1–12	4–8	4–8	5–8	7–5	4–9	5–7	4–9	—	6–7	4–8
Texas	3–9	5–7	7–6	5–8	9–3	4–8	5–8–1	4–8	8–5	5–7	11–2	7–6	—	4–8
Toronto	6–7	6–7	8–4	7–5	9–4	7–6	6–6	5–8	7–5	6–7	6–6	8–4	8–4	—

=== Notable transactions ===
- June 6, 1983: In the 1983 Major League Baseball draft, the Red Sox drafted Roger Clemens in the 1st round (19th pick) and John Mitchell in the 7th round.

=== Opening Day lineup ===
26	Wade Boggs	3B
24	Dwight Evans	RF
14	Jim Rice	LF
20	Tony Armas	CF
8	Carl Yastrzemski	DH
11	Dave Stapleton	1B
10	Rich Gedman	C
18	Glenn Hoffman	SS
12	Julio Valdez	2B
43	Dennis Eckersley	P

=== Roster ===
1983 Boston Red Sox
Roster
Pitchers: 45 Luis Aponte; 42 Doug Bird; 23 Oil Can Boyd; 27 Mike Brown; 25 Mark Clear; 43 Dennis Eckersley; 47 Bruce Hurst; 48 John Henry Johnson; 49 Al Nipper; 19 Bob Ojeda; 46 Bob Stanley; 30 John Tudor	Catchers: 39 Gary Allenson; 10 Rich Gedman; 5 Jeff Newman; Infielders: 17 Marty Barrett; 26 Wade Boggs; 41 Jackie Gutiérrez; 18 Glenn Hoffman; 22 Ed Jurak; 2 Jerry Remy; 11 Dave Stapleton; 12 Julio Valdez	Outfielders: 20 Tony Armas; 24 Dwight Evans; 12 Lee Graham; 3 Rick Miller; 51 Reid Nichols; 14 Jim Rice; 1 Chico Walker; Other batters: 8 Carl Yastrzemski	Manager: 35 Ralph Houk; Coaches: 32 Tommy Harper (First base); 33 Walt Hriniak (Bullpen); 6 Johnny Pesky (Hitting); 34 Lee Stange (Pitching); 36 Eddie Yost (Third base)

== Player stats ==
=== Batting ===
Note: G = Games played; AB = At bats; R = Runs; H = Hits; 2B = Doubles; 3B = Triples; HR = Home runs; RBI = Runs batted in; SB = Stolen bases; BB = Walks; AVG = Batting average; SLG = Slugging average

Player	G	AB	R	H	2B	3B	HR	RBI	SB	BB	AVG	SLG
Jim Rice	155	626	90	191	34	1	39	126	0	52	.305	.550
Jerry Remy	146	592	73	163	16	5	0	43	11	40	.275	.319
Wade Boggs	153	582	100	210	44	7	5	74	3	92	.361	.486
Tony Armas	145	574	77	125	23	2	36	107	0	29	.218	.453
Dave Stapleton	151	542	54	134	31	1	10	66	1	40	.247	.363
Glenn Hoffman	143	473	56	123	24	1	4	41	1	30	.260	.340
Dwight Evans	126	470	74	112	19	4	22	58	3	70	.238	.436
Carl Yastrzemski	119	380	38	101	24	0	10	56	0	54	.266	.408
Reid Nichols	100	274	35	78	22	1	6	22	7	26	.285	.438
Rick Miller	104	262	41	75	10	2	2	21	3	28	.286	.363
Gary Allenson	84	230	19	53	11	0	3	30	0	27	.230	.317
Rich Gedman	81	204	21	60	16	1	2	18	0	15	.294	.412
Ed Jurak	75	159	19	44	8	4	0	18	1	18	.277	.377
Jeff Newman	59	132	11	25	4	0	3	7	0	10	.189	.288
Marty Barrett	33	44	7	10	1	1	0	2	0	3	.227	.295
Julio Valdez	12	25	3	3	0	0	0	0	0	1	.120	.120
Jackie Gutiérrez	5	10	2	3	0	0	0	0	0	1	.300	.300
Lee Graham	5	6	2	0	0	0	0	1	0	0	.000	.000
Chico Walker	4	5	2	2	0	2	0	1	0	0	.400	1.200
Team totals	162	5590	724	1512	287	32	142	691	30	536	.270	.409

=== Pitching ===
Note: W = Wins; L = Losses; ERA = Earned run average; G = Games pitched; GS = Games started; SV = Saves; IP = Innings pitched; H = Hits allowed; R = Runs allowed; ER = Earned runs allowed; BB = Walks allowed; SO = Strikeouts

Player	W	L	ERA	G	GS	SV	IP	H	R	ER	BB	SO
John Tudor	13	12	4.09	34	34	0	242.0	236	122	110	81	136
Bruce Hurst	12	12	4.09	33	32	0	211.1	241	102	96	62	115
Dennis Eckersley	9	13	5.61	28	28	0	176.1	223	119	110	39	77
Bob Ojeda	12	7	4.04	29	28	0	173.2	173	85	78	73	94
Bob Stanley	8	10	2.85	64	0	33	145.1	145	56	46	38	65
Mike Brown	6	6	4.67	19	18	0	104.0	110	62	54	43	35
Oil Can Boyd	4	8	3.28	15	13	0	98.2	103	46	36	23	43
Mark Clear	4	5	6.28	48	0	4	96.0	101	71	67	68	81
Doug Bird	1	4	6.65	22	6	1	67.2	91	52	50	16	33
Luis Aponte	5	4	3.63	34	0	3	62.0	74	28	25	23	32
John Henry Johnson	3	2	3.71	34	1	1	53.1	58	28	22	20	51
Al Nipper	1	1	2.25	3	2	0	16.0	17	4	4	7	5
Team totals	78	84	4.34	162	162	42	1446.1	1572	775	697	493	767

== Statistical leaders ==
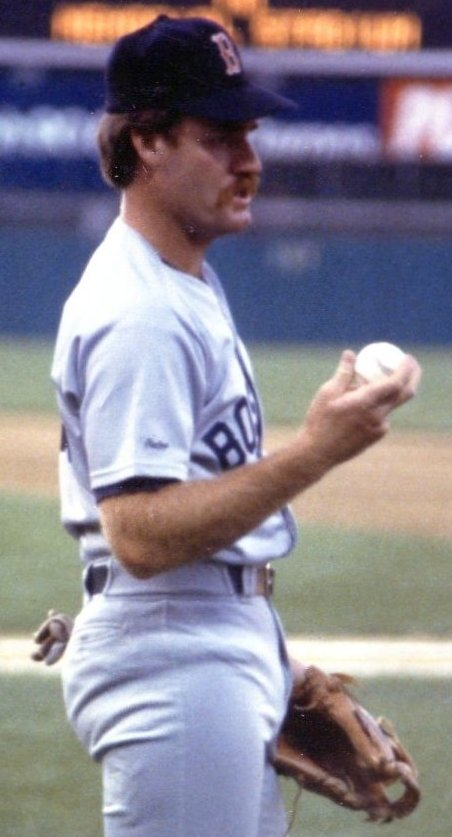
Wade Boggs

Category	Player	Statistic
Youngest player	Oil Can Boyd; Rich Gedman; Lee Graham; Jackie Gutiérrez	23
Oldest player	Carl Yastrzemski	43
Wins Above Replacement	Wade Boggs	7.8

=== Batting ===
Abbr.	Category	Player	Statistic
G	Games played	Jim Rice	155
PA	Plate appearances	Jim Rice	689
AB	At bats	Jim Rice	626
R	Runs scored	Wade Boggs	100
H	Hits	Wade Boggs	210
2B	Doubles	Wade Boggs	44
3B	Triples	Wade Boggs	7
HR	Home runs	Jim Rice	39
RBI	Runs batted in	Jim Rice	126
SB	Stolen bases	Jerry Remy	11
CS	Caught stealing	Reid Nichols	5
BB	Base on balls	Wade Boggs	92
SO	Strikeouts	Tony Armas	131
BA	Batting average	Wade Boggs	.361
OBP	On-base percentage	Wade Boggs	.444
SLG	Slugging percentage	Jim Rice	.550
OPS	On-base plus slugging	Wade Boggs	.931
OPS+	Adjusted OPS	Wade Boggs	150
TB	Total bases	Jim Rice	344
GIDP	Grounded into double play	Jim Rice	31
HBP	Hit by pitch	Jim Rice	6
SH	Sacrifice hits	Jerry Remy	12
SF	Sacrifice flies	Dave Stapleton	8
IBB	Intentional base on balls	Carl Yastrzemski	11

=== Pitching ===
Abbr.	Category	Player	Statistic
W	Wins	John Tudor	13
L	Losses	Dennis Eckersley	13
W-L %	Winning percentage	Bob Ojeda	.632 (12–7)
ERA	Earned run average	Bob Ojeda	4.04
G	Games pitched	Bob Stanley	64
GS	Games started	John Tudor	34
GF	Games finished	Bob Stanley	53
CG	Complete games	John Tudor	7
SHO	Shutouts	Bruce Hurst	2
SHO	Shutouts	John Tudor	2
SV	Saves	Bob Stanley	33
IP	Innings pitched	John Tudor	242
SO	Strikeouts	John Tudor	136
WHIP	Walks plus hits per inning pitched	John Tudor	1.310

== Awards and honors ==
Awards

- Wade Boggs – Silver Slugger Award (3B)
- Dwight Evans – Gold Glove Award (OF)
- Jim Rice – Silver Slugger Award (OF)

Accomplishments

- Jim Rice, American League Leader Home Runs (39)
- Jim Rice, American League Leader RBIs (126)

All-Star Game

- Jim Rice, starting LF
- Bob Stanley, reserve P
- Carl Yastrzemski, reserve DH

== Farm system ==
The New Britain Red Sox replaced the Bristol Red Sox as a Double-A affiliate.

Level	Team	League	Manager
AAA	Pawtucket Red Sox	International League	Tony Torchia
AA	New Britain Red Sox	Eastern League	Rac Slider
A	Winston-Salem Red Sox	Carolina League	Bill Slack
A	Winter Haven Red Sox	Florida State League	Tom Kotchman
A-Short Season	Elmira Suns	New York–Penn League	Dick Berardino

LEAGUE CHAMPIONS: New Britain
