= 1983 New York Yankees season =

Season for the Major League Baseball team the New York Yankees

1983 New York Yankees
- League: American League
- Division: East
- Ballpark: Yankee Stadium
- City: New York City
- Record: 91-71 (.562)
- Owners: George Steinbrenner
- General managers: Bill Bergesch
- Managers: Billy Martin
- Television: WPIX (Phil Rizzuto, Frank Messer, Bill White, Bobby Murcer); SportsChannel NY (Mel Allen, Fran Healy, others from WPIX)
- Radio: WABC (AM) (Frank Messer, Phil Rizzuto, Bill White, John Gordon)

The 1983 New York Yankees season was the 81st season for the Yankees. The team finished in third place in the American League East with a record of 91–71, finishing 7 games behind the Baltimore Orioles. New York was managed by Billy Martin. The Yankees played their home games at Yankee Stadium.

== Offseason ==
- November 3, 1982: Bobby Ramos was purchased from the Yankees by the Montreal Expos.
- December 1, 1982: Don Baylor was signed as a free agent by the Yankees.
- December 9, 1982: Dave Collins, Mike Morgan, Fred McGriff and cash were traded by the Yankees to the Toronto Blue Jays for Dale Murray and Tom Dodd.
- December 14, 1982: Bobby Meacham was traded by the St. Louis Cardinals with Stan Javier to the New York Yankees for Steve Fincher (minors), Bob Helsom (minors) and Marty Mason (minors).
- December 22, 1982: Lee Mazzilli was traded by the New York Yankees to the Pittsburgh Pirates for Tim Burke, Don Aubin (minors), John Holland (minors), and Jose Rivera (minors).
- January 11, 1983: Ozzie Canseco was drafted by the Yankees in the 2nd round of the 1983 Major League Baseball draft.
- February 24, 1983: Bert Campaneris was signed as a free agent by the Yankees.
- February 28, 1983: Rowland Office was signed as a free agent by the Yankees.
- March 24, 1983: John Mayberry was released by the Yankees.

=== Spring training ===
For the fourth straight spring training, the Yankees played an exhibition game at the Louisiana Superdome. On March 27, 1983, the Yankees beat the Toronto Blue Jays 2 to 1 behind six shutout innings from Doyle Alexander. Attendance was 15,129 for the game.

== Regular season ==
- June 11, 1983: Longtime Yankee Bobby Murcer played in the last game of his career.
- June 20, 1983: Bobby Murcer announced his retirement from the New York Yankees. On the same day, he became part of the Yankees Broadcasting Team for WPIX TV.
- July 4, 1983: Dave Righetti threw a no-hitter against the Boston Red Sox
- August 4, 1983: Dave Winfield, while warming up before the 5th inning of a game at Toronto's Exhibition Stadium, accidentally killed a seagull with a thrown ball. He doffed his cap in mock sorrow. Fans responded by hurling obscenities and improvised missiles. After the game, he was brought to the Ontario Provincial Police station on charges of cruelty to animals and was forced to post a $500 bond before being released. Quipped Yankees manager Billy Martin, "It's the first time he's hit the cutoff man." The charges were dropped the following day. For years afterward Winfield's appearances in Toronto were greeted with loud choruses of boos, but he later became a fan favorite.

=== Pine Tar Game ===
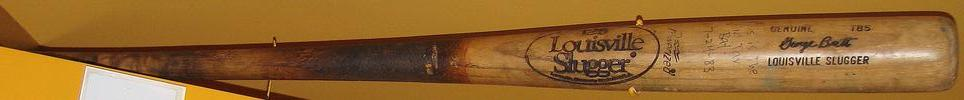
The baseball bat used by Kansas City Royals third baseman George Brett in the Pine Tar Incident on July 24, 1983.

The Pine Tar Game refers to a controversial incident that took place in an American League baseball game played between the Kansas City Royals and New York Yankees on July 24, 1983.

Playing at New York's Yankee Stadium, the Royals were trailing 4–3 with two outs in the top of the ninth and U L Washington on first base. In the on deck circle, George Brett was heard remarking to a teammate, "Watch this baby fly" as he shook his bat. He then came to the plate and connected off Yankee reliever Rich "Goose" Gossage for a two-run home run and a 5–4 lead. As Brett crossed the plate, New York manager Billy Martin approached home plate umpire Tim McClelland and requested that Brett's bat be examined. Earlier in the season, Martin and other members (most notably, third baseman Graig Nettles, who as a member of the Minnesota Twins, recalled a similar incident involving Thurman Munson) of the Yankees had noticed the amount of pine tar used by Brett, but Martin had chosen not to say anything until the home run.

With Brett watching from the dugout, McClelland and the rest of the umpiring crew inspected the bat. Measuring the bat against the width of home plate (which is 17 inches), they determined that the amount of pine tar on the bat's handle exceeded that allowed by Rule 1.10(b) of the Major League Baseball rule book, which read that "a bat may not be covered by such a substance more than 18 inches from the tip of the handle." McClelland then turned to the Royals dugout, where Brett was standing watching the discussion, and ruled him out. An irate Brett charged out of the dugout to argue his case and had to be held back by several of his teammates.

The call ended the game and gave the Yankees a 4-3 victory, but a protest by the Royals was successful. The home run was restored and the two teams returned to the field on August 18 for the final four outs of the contest, and Brett, manager Dick Howser, pitcher Gaylord Perry (who attempted to steal the bat), and coach Rocky Colavito were all ejected from the game (Brett for the illegal bat and the others for their actions in the aftermath). George Frazier struck out Hal McRae to end the top of the ninth, and Dan Quisenberry retired the Yankees in order in the bottom half to preserve the 5-4 victory. Mike Armstrong was given the win with Gossage taking the loss.

=== Season standings ===
AL East
Team	W	L	Pct.	GB	Home	Road
Baltimore Orioles	98	64	.605	—	50‍–‍31	48‍–‍33
Detroit Tigers	92	70	.568	6	48‍–‍33	44‍–‍37
New York Yankees	91	71	.562	7	51‍–‍30	40‍–‍41
Toronto Blue Jays	89	73	.549	9	48‍–‍33	41‍–‍40
Milwaukee Brewers	87	75	.537	11	52‍–‍29	35‍–‍46
Boston Red Sox	78	84	.481	20	38‍–‍43	40‍–‍41
Cleveland Indians	70	92	.432	28	36‍–‍45	34‍–‍47

=== Record vs. opponents ===
1983 American League record Sources:
Team	BAL	BOS	CAL	CWS	CLE	DET	KC	MIL	MIN	NYY	OAK	SEA	TEX	TOR
Baltimore	—	8–5	7–5	7–5	6–7	5–8	8–4	11–2	8–4	6–7	8–4	8–4	9–3	7–6
Boston	5–8	—	6–6	6–6	7–6	4–9	5–7	4–9	5–7	7–6	8–4	7–5	7–5	7–6
California	5–7	6–6	—	3–10	8–4	4–8	6–7	6–6	6–7	5–7	5–8	6–7	6–7	4–8
Chicago	5–7	6–6	10–3	—	8–4	8–4	9–4	4–8	8–5	8–4	8–5	12–1	8–5	5–7
Cleveland	7–6	6–7	4–8	4–8	—	5–8	7–5	3–10	6–6	6–7	7–5	8–4	3–9	4–9
Detroit	8–5	9–4	8–4	4–8	8–5	—	7–5	6–7	9–3	5–8	6–6	8–4	8–4	6–7
Kansas City	4–8	7–5	7–6	4–9	5–7	5–7	—	6–6	6–7	6–6	7–6	8–5	8–5–1	6–6
Milwaukee	2–11	9–4	6–6	8–4	10–3	7–6	6–6	—	8–4	4–9	6–6	5–7	8–4	8–5
Minnesota	4–8	7–5	7–6	5–8	6–6	3–9	7–6	4–8	—	4–8	4–9	9–4	5–8	5–7
New York	7–6	6–7	7–5	4–8	7–6	8–5	6–6	9–4	8–4	—	8–4	7–5	7–5	7–6
Oakland	4–8	4–8	8–5	5–8	5–7	6–6	6–7	6–6	9–4	4–8	—	9–4	2–11	6–6
Seattle	4–8	5–7	7–6	1–12	4–8	4–8	5–8	7–5	4–9	5–7	4–9	—	6–7	4–8
Texas	3–9	5–7	7–6	5–8	9–3	4–8	5–8–1	4–8	8–5	5–7	11–2	7–6	—	4–8
Toronto	6–7	6–7	8–4	7–5	9–4	7–6	6–6	5–8	7–5	6–7	6–6	8–4	8–4	—

=== Notable transactions ===
- May 31, 1983: Doyle Alexander was released by the Yankees.
- June 6, 1983: University of Nebraska quarterback Turner Gill was selected by the Yankees in the 18th round of the 1983 Major League Baseball draft.
- June 9, 1983: Rick Reuschel was released by the Yankees.
- June 15, 1983: Ben Callahan, Marshall Brant and cash were traded by the Yankees to the Oakland Athletics for Matt Keough.
- June 17, 1983: Dave Wehrmeister was traded by the Yankees to the Philadelphia Phillies for Jim Rasmussen (minors) and Kelly Faulk (minors).
- July 22, 1983: Mike York was released by the Yankees.

=== Roster ===
1983 New York Yankees
Roster
Pitchers: 52 Doyle Alexander; 35 Roger Erickson; 47,57 Ray Fontenot; 43 George Frazier; 54 Goose Gossage; 49 Ron Guidry; 53,50 Jay Howell; 55 Curt Kaufman; 34 Matt Keough; 34,38 Dave LaRoche; 45 Rudy May; 24 John Montefusco; 48 Dale Murray; 26 Shane Rawley; 19 Dave Righetti; 29 Bob Shirley	Catchers: 10 Rick Cerone; 65 Juan Espino; 27 Butch Wynegar; Infielders: 28,66 Steve Balboni; 56 Bert Campaneris; 33 Ken Griffey; 20 Bob Meacham; 39 Larry Milbourne; 9 Graig Nettles; 30 Willie Randolph; 18 Andre Robertson; 12 Roy Smalley	Outfielders: 62 Brian Dayett; 17 Oscar Gamble; 21 Steve Kemp; 46 Don Mattingly; 22 Omar Moreno; 22 Jerry Mumphrey; 39 Otis Nixon; 20 Rowland Office; 14 Lou Piniella; 31 Dave Winfield; Other batters: 25 Don Baylor; 2 Bobby Murcer	Manager: 1 Billy Martin; Coaches: 8 Yogi Berra; 42 Art Fowler; 41,11 Jeff Torborg (Bullpen); Lee Walls; 6 Roy White; 40,23 Don Zimmer

== Player stats ==
=== Batting ===
==== Starters by position ====
Note: Pos = Position; G = Games played; AB = At bats; H = Hits; Avg. = Batting average; HR = Home runs; RBI = Runs batted in

Pos	Player	G	AB	H	Avg.	HR	RBI
C	Butch Wynegar	94	301	89	.296	6	42
1B	Ken Griffey Sr.	118	458	140	.306	11	46
2B	Willie Randolph	104	420	117	.279	2	38
SS	Roy Smalley III	130	451	124	.275	18	62
3B	Graig Nettles	129	462	123	.266	20	75
LF	Dave Winfield	152	598	169	.283	32	116
CF	Jerry Mumphrey	83	267	70	.262	7	36
RF	Steve Kemp	109	373	90	.241	12	49
DH	Don Baylor	144	534	162	.303	21	85

==== Other batters ====
Note: G = Games played; AB = At bats; H = Hits; Avg. = Batting average; HR = Home runs; RBI = Runs batted in

Player	G	AB	H	Avg.	HR	RBI
Andre Robertson	98	322	80	.248	1	22
Don Mattingly	91	279	79	.283	4	32
Rick Cerone	80	246	54	.220	2	22
Oscar Gamble	74	180	47	.261	7	26
Omar Moreno	48	152	38	.250	1	17
Lou Piniella	53	148	43	.291	2	16
Bert Campaneris	60	143	46	.322	0	11
Steve Balboni	32	86	20	.233	5	17
Larry Milbourne	31	70	14	.200	0	2
Bob Meacham	22	51	12	.235	0	4
Brian Dayett	11	29	6	.207	0	5
Juan Espino	10	23	6	.261	1	3
Bobby Murcer	9	22	4	.182	1	1
Otis Nixon	13	14	2	.143	0	0
Rowland Office	2	2	0	.000	0	1

=== Pitching ===
==== Starting pitchers ====
Note: G = Games pitched; IP = Innings pitched; W = Wins; L = Losses; ERA = Earned run average; SO = Strikeouts

Player	G	IP	W	L	ERA	SO
Ron Guidry	31	250.1	21	9	3.42	156
Shane Rawley	34	238.1	14	14	3.78	124
Dave Righetti	31	217.0	14	8	3.44	169
Ray Fontenot	15	97.1	8	2	3.33	27
Matt Keough	12	55.2	3	4	5.17	26
John Montefusco	6	38.0	5	0	3.32	15

==== Other pitchers ====
Note: G = Games pitched; IP = Innings pitched; W = Wins; L = Losses; ERA = Earned run average; SO = Strikeouts

Player	G	IP	W	L	ERA	SO
Bob Shirley	25	108.0	5	8	5.08	53
Jay Howell	19	82.0	1	5	5.38	61
Doyle Alexander	8	28.1	0	2	6.35	17

==== Relief pitchers ====
Note: G = Games pitched; W = Wins; L = Losses; SV = Saves; ERA = Earned run average; SO = Strikeouts

Player	G	W	L	SV	ERA	SO
Rich Gossage	57	13	5	22	2.27	90
George Frazier	61	4	4	8	3.43	78
Dale Murray	40	2	4	1	4.48	45
Rudy May	15	1	5	0	6.87	16
Roger Erickson	5	0	1	0	4.32	7
Curt Kaufman	4	0	0	0	3.12	8
Dave LaRoche	1	0	0	0	18.00	0

== Awards and honors ==
Ron Guidry and Dave Winfield represented the Yankees at the 1983 Major League Baseball All-Star Game.

Gold Gloves were awarded to pitcher, Guidry and outfielder, Winfield.

Winfield also won the Silver Slugger Award.

== Farm system ==
Level	Team	League	Manager
AAA	Columbus Clippers	International League	Johnny Oates
AA	Nashville Sounds	Southern League	Doug Holmquist
A	Fort Lauderdale Yankees	Florida State League	Stump Merrill
A	Greensboro Hornets	South Atlantic League	Carlos Tosca
A-Short Season	Oneonta Yankees	New York–Penn League	Bill Livesey
