= Cliff Pastornicky =

American baseball player (born 1958)

- Third baseman
- Born: November 18, 1958 (age 66); Seattle, Washington, U.S.
- Batted: Right Threw: Right

MLB debut
- June 14, 1983, for the Kansas City Royals

Last MLB appearance
- June 27, 1983, for the Kansas City Royals

MLB statistics
- Batting average: .125
- Home runs: 2
- Runs batted in: 5
- Stats at Baseball Reference

Teams
- Kansas City Royals (1983)

Clifford Scot Pastornicky (born November 18, 1958) is an American former Major League Baseball player.

Pastornicky was drafted by the Kansas City Royals in the 8th round of the 1980 draft. He made his debut on June 14, 1983 with the Royals, and batted 2/5/.125 in ten career games in the majors. He played the majority of his career in Double and Triple-A.

Prior to playing professionally, Pastornicky was an All-WAC shortstop at BYU from 1978 - 1980 setting the career home run record with 31 HRs.

== Personal ==
His son is shortstop Tyler Pastornicky. His father, Ernest Pastornicky, played in the Chicago Cubs minor league system.
