= Al Jones (1980s pitcher) =

American baseball player (born 1959)

- Pitcher
- Born: February 10, 1959 (age 67); Charleston, Mississippi, U.S.
- Batted: Right Threw: Right

MLB debut
- August 6, 1983, for the Chicago White Sox

Last MLB appearance
- September 30, 1985, for the Chicago White Sox

MLB statistics
- Win–loss record: 2–1
- Earned run average: 3.77
- Strikeouts: 19

CPBL statistics
- Win–loss record: 6–15
- Earned run average: 3.69
- Strikeouts: 130
- Stats at Baseball Reference

Teams
- Chicago White Sox (1983–1985); Brother Elephants (1991–1994, 1998–1999)

Career highlights and awards
- 3× Taiwan Series champion (1992–1994)

Alfornia Jones (born February 10, 1959) is an American former professional baseball relief pitcher. Jones played in MLB for the Chicago White Sox in parts of three seasons from 1983 to 1985.

== Career ==
He played from 1983 through 1985 for the Chicago White Sox of Major League Baseball (MLB). His tenure with the White Sox ended when he and Tom Hartley were traded to the Milwaukee Brewers for Ray Searage. After the 1987 season, Jones became a free agent, and in 1990 signed with the Montreal Expos organization. Jones then went on to play from 1991 to 1994, and in 1998 and 1999 for the Brother Elephants of the Chinese Professional Baseball League.
