= John Shelby =

American baseball player (born 1958)

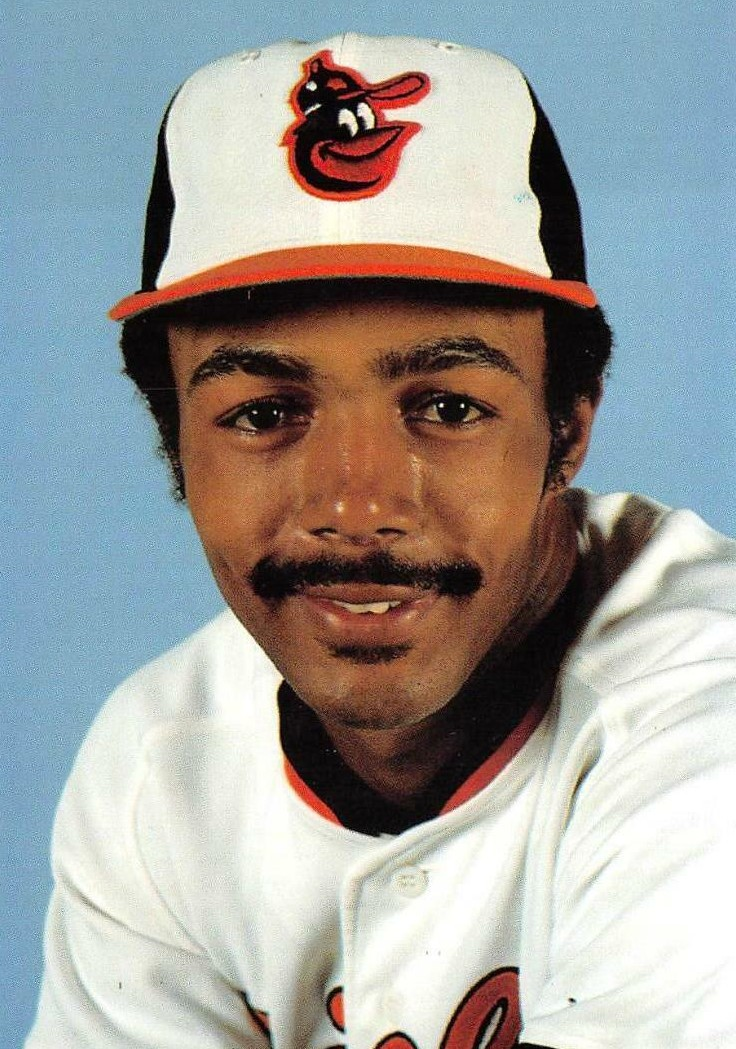
- Outfielder
- Born: February 23, 1958 (age 68); Lexington, Kentucky, U.S.
- Batted: Switch Threw: Right

MLB debut
- September 15, 1981, for the Baltimore Orioles

Last MLB appearance
- August 11, 1991, for the Detroit Tigers

MLB statistics
- Batting average: .239
- Home runs: 70
- Runs batted in: 313
- Stats at Baseball Reference

Teams
- As player: Baltimore Orioles (1981–1987); Los Angeles Dodgers (1987–1990); Detroit Tigers (1990–1991); As coach: Los Angeles Dodgers (1998–2005); Pittsburgh Pirates (2006–2007); Baltimore Orioles (2008–2010); Milwaukee Brewers (2013)

Career highlights and awards
- 2× World Series champion (1983, 1988)

John T. Shelby (born February 23, 1958) is an American former center fielder in Major League Baseball (MLB) who played from 1981 to 1991. He began his career as a member of the Baltimore Orioles before later playing for the Los Angeles Dodgers and Detroit Tigers. Shelby was a member of two World Series–winning teams: the 1983 Orioles and the 1988 Dodgers. His nickname was "T-Bone" because of his slight frame. He currently is a coach in the Atlanta Braves minor league system.

== Early life ==
Shelby was born in Lexington, Kentucky, on February 23, 1958. In 1976, he graduated from Henry Clay High School in Lexington, where he played baseball (as a shortstop) and basketball and was an all-area performer. He played one year of baseball at Columbia State Community College in Columbia, Tennessee.

== Baseball career ==
=== Playing career ===
In the January 1977 amateur draft, Shelby was a first–round pick (20th overall) of the Baltimore Orioles. He made his professional debut that year for the Bluefield Orioles of the Appalachian League, batting .256 with 21 RBI in 60 games. While with the Orioles, Shelby was a member of the 1983 World Series championship team in his first full year at the major league level. He hit .444 (4-for-9) with an RBI in that year's World Series.

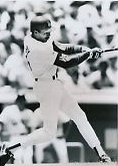
Shelby with the Los Angeles Dodgers in 1988

When Shelby was traded to the Dodgers during the 1987 season, the team was so desperate for a center fielder that he was rushed into uniform and into his first game. There was not even time to put his name on the back of his uniform, so he played the entire game without his name stitched onto his uniform. During Game 4 of the 1988 National League Championship Series, he drew a crucial walk off Dwight Gooden in the top of the ninth inning, allowing Mike Scioscia to come up and hit a game-tying home run, paving the way for the game-winning home run by Kirk Gibson in the top of the twelfth inning. He also had a two-run single earlier in the game. The Dodgers would go on to win the 1988 World Series and Shelby his second title.

On June 3, 1989, he batted 0-for-10 in a 22–inning game against the Houston Astros.

After the Dodgers released Shelby on June 2, 1990, he was signed eleven days later by the Detroit Tigers. He became a free agent following the season, but the Tigers re–signed him on November 26. He was released by the Tigers on August 13, 1991.

In 1992, Shelby's final season as a professional baseball player, he appeared in 127 games for the Pawtucket Red Sox, the Class AAA affiliate of the Boston Red Sox. He tallied 17 home runs and 64 RBI, but managed only a .205 batting average.

=== Coaching career ===
Shelby was the hitting coach for the Albuquerque Isotopes, the Triple-A affiliate of the Colorado Rockies. In addition to managing several minor league teams, he has also served as a coach for the Dodgers, Pittsburgh Pirates, Baltimore Orioles, and Milwaukee Brewers. He was hired as a roving minor league instructor with the Atlanta Braves for the 2017 season.

== Personal life ==
His oldest son, John Shelby III, is a former player in Major League Baseball and now a coach in the farm system of the Boston Red Sox. His second-oldest son, Jeremy Shelby, played one season in the Baltimore Orioles' farm system. His fourth-oldest son, JaVon Shelby, played for the University of Kentucky Wildcats baseball team and was drafted by the Oakland Athletics in 2016 amateur draft. His nephew Josh Harrison is a former major league player.

Preceded by Reggie Smith	Los Angeles Dodgers First Base Coach; 1998–2005	Succeeded by Mariano Duncan
Preceded by Rusty Kuntz	Pittsburgh Pirates First Base Coach; 2006–2007	Succeeded by Lou Frazier
Preceded by Sam Mejias	Baltimore Orioles First Base Coach; 2008–2010	Succeeded by Wayne Kirby
