= Leo Hernández =

Venezuelan baseball player (born 1959)

- Third baseman
- Born: November 6, 1959 (age 66); Santa Lucia, Miranda, Venezuela
- Batted: Right Threw: Right

MLB debut
- September 19, 1982, for the Baltimore Orioles

Last MLB appearance
- October 2, 1986, for the New York Yankees

MLB statistics
- Batting average: .226
- Home runs: 7
- Runs batted in: 30
- Stats at Baseball Reference

Teams
- Baltimore Orioles (1982–1983, 1985); New York Yankees (1986)

Member of the Venezuelan

Baseball Hall of Fame
- Induction: 2019
- Vote: 75%
- Election method: Contemporary Committee

Leonardo Jesús Hernández (born November 6, 1959), commonly known as Leo Hernandez (er-NAN-dez), is a Venezuelan former Major League Baseball third baseman and right-handed batter who played for the Baltimore Orioles (1982–83, 1985) and New York Yankees (1986). He is currently the hitting coach for DSL Mets1.

== Career ==
A native of Santa Lucía, Miranda State, Venezuela, Hernández was signed as an amateur free agent by the Los Angeles Dodgers in 1978. He hit .298 with 25 home runs and 91 runs batted in (RBI) with the San Antonio Missions in 1981. After batting .313 in 18 games with the Albuquerque Dukes to begin the 1982 season, he was traded from the Dodgers to the Orioles for José Morales on April 28, 1982. He made his debut with Baltimore on September 19, 1982. He was sent from the Orioles to the Yankees on December 16, 1985 to complete a transaction from five days prior on December 11 when Gary Roenicke was traded to New York for Rex Hudler and Rich Bordi.

In four-season career, Hernández hit .226 with seven home runs and 30 RBI in 85 games.

Hernandez was named as the hitting coach for the DSL Mets 1 of the New York Mets organization for the 2018 season.

== See also ==
- List of players from Venezuela in Major League Baseball
