= Dan Morogiello =

American baseball player (born 1955)

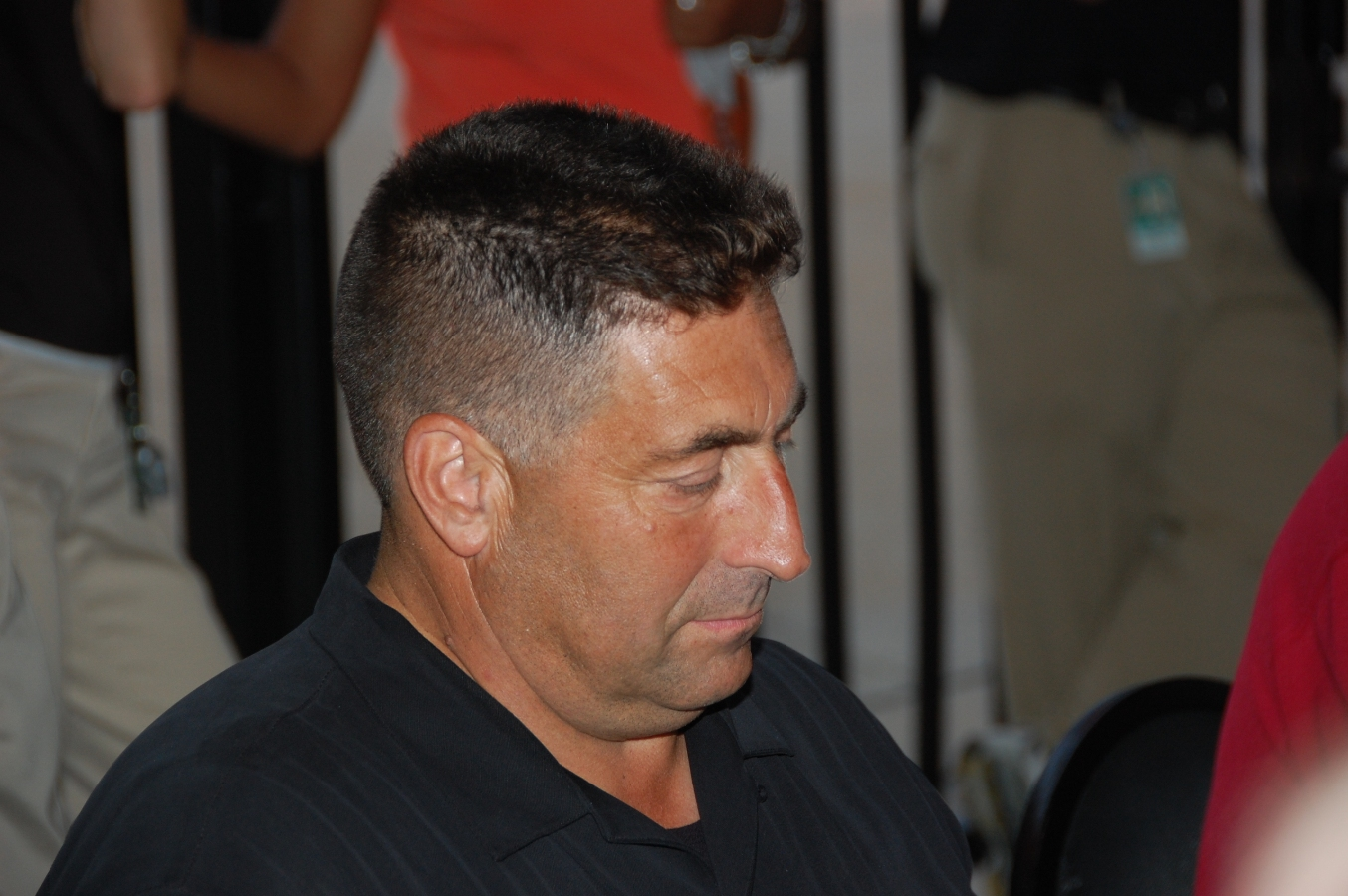
- Morogiello at 25th Anniversary of Orioles' 1983 World Series Championship
- Pitcher
- Born: March 26, 1955 (age 70); Brooklyn, New York, U.S.
- Batted: Left Threw: Left

MLB debut
- May 20, 1983, for the Baltimore Orioles

Last MLB appearance
- September 22, 1983, for the Baltimore Orioles

MLB statistics
- Earned run average: 2.39
- Strikeouts: 15
- Saves: 1
- Stats at Baseball Reference

Teams
- Baltimore Orioles (1983)

Daniel Joseph Morogiello (born March 26, 1955) is an American former 1976 third-round draft choice of the Atlanta Braves. He played a total of 10 professional seasons, reaching the majors with the 1983 World Series champion Baltimore Orioles.

On June 5, 1974, Morogiello was drafted in the eighth-round out of Canarsie High School but chose not to sign. Instead, he went on to pitch two seasons at Seton Hall University for head coach Mike Sheppard, leading the Pirates to the 1975 College World Series. Following his professional career, he pitched 10 more years in the Met League and was inducted into the Bergen County (NJ) Hall of Fame. Active in over-30 leagues for several years after that, Morogiello also served as pitching coach at Hunterdon Central Regional HS from 1999 to 2002. In 2004, he joined the NJIT Baseball coaching staff where he became a volunteer assistant in working with the NJIT pitching staff.

== Professional career ==
After being drafted by the Atlanta Braves in 1976, he spent several years in the Minor League system before making his Major League debut with the Baltimore Orioles on May 20, 1983, against the Toronto Blue Jays. In his one year in Major League baseball, Morogiello compiled an 0–1 record, with 37.2 innings pitched in 22 appearances with a stellar 2.39 ERA for the World Series champions. On July 11, 1983, Morogiello picked up his only major league save. He pitched 2 shutout innings to help the Orioles defeat the Athletics, 7–6. His final Major League game was September 22, 1983.

== Sources ==
- Career statistics from Baseball Reference · Baseball Reference (Minors) · Retrosheet · Baseball Almanac, or Baseball Almanac, or Retrosheet
