= Lee Graham =

American baseball player (born 1959)

- Outfielder
- Born: September 22, 1959; Summerfield, Florida, U.S.
- Batted: Left Threw: Left

MLB debut
- September 3, 1983, for the Boston Red Sox

Last MLB appearance
- October 2, 1983, for the Boston Red Sox

MLB statistics
- Batting average: .000
- Home runs: 0
- Runs batted in: 1
- Stats at Baseball Reference

Teams
- Boston Red Sox (1983)

Lee Willard Graham (born September 22, 1959) is an American former outfielder in Major League Baseball who played briefly for the Boston Red Sox during the 1983 season. Listed at 5' 10", 170 lb., Graham batted and threw left-handed.

Graham went hitless in six at-bats, while scoring two runs with one RBI in five games. He appeared in three games as an outfielder, collecting a perfect 1.000 fielding average in seven chances.

== Baseball career ==
Lee was selected by the Boston Red Sox in the 26th round (641st overall) of the 1977 June Amateur Baseball draft out of Forest High School (Florida).
