= Bobby Bonner =

American baseball player and missionary (born 1956)

- Shortstop
- Born: August 12, 1956 (age 70); Uvalde, Texas, U.S.
- Batted: Right Threw: Right

MLB debut
- September 12, 1980, for the Baltimore Orioles

Last MLB appearance
- September 28, 1983, for the Baltimore Orioles

MLB statistics
- Batting average: .194
- Home runs: 0
- Runs batted in: 8
- Stats at Baseball Reference

Teams
- Baltimore Orioles (1980–1983)

Robert Averill Bonner (born August 12, 1956) is an American former professional baseball player and currently a Baptist missionary.

He was drafted by the Baltimore Orioles in the third round of the 1976 MLB draft. He played parts of four seasons in Major League Baseball, from 1980 and 1983, all for the Baltimore Orioles, primarily as a shortstop. Beginning on the evening of April 18, 1981, he had 12 at-bats in the longest professional baseball game ever played, 33 innings, between the Pawtucket Red Sox and the Rochester Red Wings. Bonner was called up by the Orioles' in May 1981 to replace an injured Lenn Sakata. Orioles' general manager Hank Peters and Tom Giordano chose to call him up over Cal Ripken Jr., the choice of Earl Weaver and the Orioles' coaching staff. Weaver remarked in an interview, "Bonner can play and our minor league people know what they're doing. But it seems to me if we need a guy like Ripken, who can hit the ball out of the park, he deserves a chance. Our main need is freakin' runs, and don't let anybody kid you." Bonner hit .296 in 1981, but was sent down after nine games at the end of May and made only one more appearance in 1981, on September 15.

After retiring from baseball after the 1984 season, he became a missionary in Zambia, serving there for twenty-six years. Upon returning to the United States, he started International African Missions, an organization focused on getting missionaries and nationals help in all African countries.

He is married to Becky. Bonner and appeared on Cal Ripken Jr.'s 1982 Topps rookie card along with pitcher Jeff Schneider.
