= Salomé Barojas =

Mexican baseball player (born 1957)

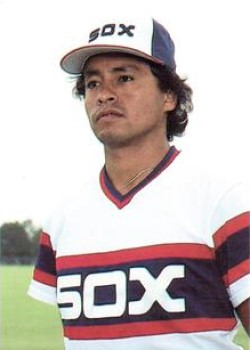
- Pitcher
- Born: June 16, 1957 (age 69); Córdoba, Veracruz, Mexico
- Batted: Right Threw: Right

MLB debut
- April 11, 1982, for the Chicago White Sox

Last MLB appearance
- September 26, 1988, for the Philadelphia Phillies

MLB statistics
- Win–loss record: 18–21
- Earned run average: 3.95
- Strikeouts: 177
- Stats at Baseball Reference

Teams
- Chicago White Sox (1982–1984); Seattle Mariners (1984–1985); Philadelphia Phillies (1988)

Member of the Mexican Professional

Baseball Hall of Fame
- Induction: 2002

Salomé Barojas Romero (born June 16, 1957, in Córdoba, Veracruz) is a Mexican former relief pitcher in Major League Baseball who played for the Chicago White Sox, Seattle Mariners, and Philadelphia Phillies from 1982 to 1988. Barojas began and ended his professional career in the Mexican Baseball League and was inducted into the Mexican Professional Baseball Hall of Fame in 2002.

== Playing career ==
=== Major League Baseball ===
Barojas was an integral part of the 1983 Chicago White Sox team that won the American League (AL) West division – the first White Sox team to make the postseason since 1959.

Barojas played five years in the major leagues. The White Sox purchased his contract from the Diablos Rojos del México in April 1982. Chicago manager and future Hall of Famer Tony La Russia had personally scouted Barojas in Mexico. He was the White Sox closer to start his rookie season, picking up a save in each of his first five games pitched. He was named the AL Player of the Week his first week in MLB, the first time that had happened in the majors. His 21 saves were a franchise rookie record and ranked sixth in the AL.

After two and a half seasons with Chicago, the White Sox traded Barojas to the Seattle Mariners for Jerry Don Gleaton and Gene Nelson. Barojas had his only stretch as a starter in the majors with Seattle, winning his first four decisions as a starter. Seattle released Barojas after the 1985 season, and he returned to play in Mexico. The Philadelphia Phillies purchased his contract from the Diablos Rojos in July 1988. After pitching in six MLB games, the Phillies released him on September 29.

Bob Sheppard, public address announcer for the New York Yankees, said Barojas had one of his favorite names to announce.

=== Mexican baseball ===
Barojas played 17 seasons in the Mexican League. He finished with 115 wins and 58 losses for a .665 percentage, the second highest figure in the history of the circuit. He played four years with Cordoba, two with Reynosa, and eleven in Mexico City.

His best seasons in Mexico were in 1978, 1981, 1987, 1988, and 1991. In 1978, he was 8–3 with a 2.45 earned run average (ERA) playing with Cordoba. In 1981, he finished 12–3 with a 3.03 ERA. In 1987, he was 13–4 with a 3.10 ERA. The next year, he was 14–4 and 3.14. In 1991, he was 10–1 and 2.44. He pitched 543 games, started 85 and finished 30. The Veracruz was a great relief because he managed 152 rescues. He pitched 1,406 innings with a third, struck out 773 batters and allowed 648 walks.

In the winter Mexican Pacific League, he won 51 games and lost 39. In 1989–1990, with Mazatlan, he was saves leader with 17. He is fourth in saves with 53. It is ranked 14th in effectiveness of all time with 2.68.

In February 2025, Barojas was selected by a committee of journalists as a pitcher for the Mexican League Centennial All-Time Team on the occasion of the league's hundredth anniversary.

== Personal life ==
Barojas is the youngest of seven children.
