= Allan Ramirez =

American baseball player (born 1957)

- Pitcher
- Born: May 1, 1957 (age 69); Victoria, Texas, U.S.
- Batted: Right Threw: Right

MLB debut
- June 8, 1983, for the Baltimore Orioles

Last MLB appearance
- September 13, 1983, for the Baltimore Orioles

MLB statistics
- Win–loss record: 4–4
- Earned run average: 3.47
- Strikeouts: 20
- Stats at Baseball Reference

Teams
- Baltimore Orioles (1983)

Daniel Allan Ramirez (born May 1, 1957) is an American former Major League Baseball pitcher. He attended Rice University.

In 1975, Ramirez was drafted by the Philadelphia Phillies in the 23rd round (535th overall) but opted not to sign. Three years later, he was drafted by the Texas Rangers in the 10th round (254th) but still did not sign. One year later, he was drafted by the Baltimore Orioles in the 5th round (123rd) and did sign.

His professional career started one year later, in 1979 in the Florida State League. Even though his record in his first season was 3–9, his earned run average (ERA) of 2.61 was enough to earn him a promotion to AA, where he went 16–8 with a 2.98 ERA in 29 games the next season. His 1981 season with AAA Rochester was less successful, with a 4.17 ERA over 8 games. Ramirez spent time in A-ball that year too, going 0–1 with a 2.77 ERA.

On June 8, 1983, at the age of 26, he made his Major League debut with the Baltimore Orioles. Over the course of 11 games pitched for the Orioles that the season, he gave up 30 walks while striking out only 20 batters, and he did not return the majors.

Ramirez currently resides in Victoria, Texas.
