= Al Bumbry =

American baseball player (born 1947)

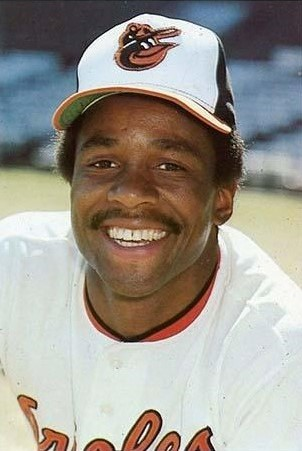
- Center fielder
- Born: April 21, 1947 (age 79); Fredericksburg, Virginia, U.S.
- Batted: Left Threw: Right

MLB debut
- September 5, 1972, for the Baltimore Orioles

Last MLB appearance
- October 5, 1985, for the San Diego Padres

MLB statistics
- Batting average: .281
- Home runs: 54
- Runs batted in: 402
- Stats at Baseball Reference

Teams
- As player: Baltimore Orioles (1972–1984); San Diego Padres (1985); As coach: Boston Red Sox (1988–1993); Baltimore Orioles (1995); Cleveland Indians (1998, 2002)

Career highlights and awards
- All-Star (1980); World Series champion (1983); AL Rookie of the Year (1973); Baltimore Orioles Hall of Fame

Alonza Benjamin Bumbry (né Bumbrey; born April 21, 1947) is an American former Major League Baseball (MLB) outfielder who played for the Baltimore Orioles and San Diego Padres from 1972 through 1985. Bumbry was the 1973 American League Rookie of the Year, and went on to be an All-Star and World Series champion. He is an inductee of the Baltimore Orioles Hall of Fame and the Virginia Sports Hall of Fame. Prior to his major league career, Bumbry served in the US Army during the Vietnam War and was awarded a Bronze Star.

== Early life ==
Bumbry was born in Fredericksburg, Virginia, and graduated from Ralph Bunche High School in King George, Virginia. He attended Virginia State College on a basketball scholarship, which he played for four years. While Bumbry was at Virginia State, the school restarted its baseball program; Bumbry played during his final year, batted .578, and was named the team's Most Outstanding Player. Bumbry was in ROTC at Virginia State, obligating him to serve for two years in the US military. Bumbry served in the United States Army and led a platoon during the Vietnam War, receiving the Bronze Star Medal.

== Playing career ==
=== Path to the majors ===
Bumbry was drafted by the Baltimore Orioles in the 11th round of the 1968 Major League Baseball draft. He started his professional career in 1969 for the Stockton Ports of the Class A California League, where he appeared in 35 games, batting .178 with 3 runs batted in (RBIs) and 10 stolen bases. To fulfill his military service obligation, Bumbry served in the US Army from July 1969 to June 1971, as a platoon leader during the Vietnam War. After his military service completed in 1971, Bumbry appeared in 66 games for the Aberdeen Pheasants of the Class A Northern League, where he batted .336 with 53 RBIs, 6 home runs, and 34 stolen bases. In 1972, Bumbry appeared with two minor league teams; the Asheville Orioles of the Class AA Southern League, and the Rochester Red Wings of the Class AAA International League. He appeared in 134 total games for those teams, batting .345 with 57 RBIs, 10 home runs, and 32 stolen bases.

=== Baltimore Orioles ===
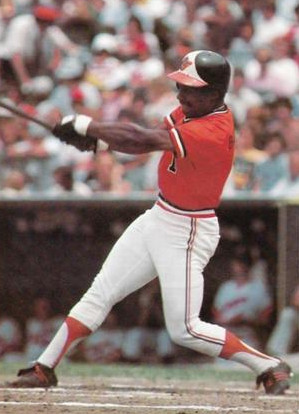
Bumbry in 1977

Bumbry appeared in 9 games for the Orioles late in the 1972 season. His first MLB appearance came on September 5, as a pinch hitter against the New York Yankees; he flied out to center field. After several other pinch hitting and pinch running appearances, Bumbry collected his first hit on October 3, a single against Dick Tidrow of the Cleveland Indians. Bumbry finished the season batting 4-for-11 (.364) with 5 runs scored.

==== 1973 Rookie of the Year ====
For the 1973 season, Bumbry appeared mostly as a pinch runner during the first month of the season. In May he began to play more, usually batting as the leadoff hitter, then in June he appeared in all but one game the team played, as he was hitting well. At the All-Star break in July he had a .304 average, at the end of August he was batting .312, and he finished the season with a .337 average, and had 34 RBIs, 73 runs scored, 23 stolen bases, and 7 home runs. He also had a league-leading 11 triples, including three on September 22 against the Milwaukee Brewers, tying both the American League (AL) and MLB records for most triples in a single game. Defensively, Bumbry started 82 games in the outfield (58 in left field, 24 in right field) and had a .978 fielding average. The Orioles won the AL East division, but lost to the Oakland Athletics in the ALCS. Bumbry played left field in the third and fifth game of the series; he had a walk in each game, but was hitless in seven at bats. Bumbry was named the AL Rookie of the Year, receiving 13 of 23 first place votes.

Bumbry did not hit well in 1974 – he was batting below .200 as late as July 3, and finished the season with a .233 average, 19 RBIs, 35 runs scored, 12 stolen bases, and 1 home run. Defensively he started 65 games in left field, and had a .953 fielding average. The Orioles again won the AL East, and again lost to the Oakland Athletics in the ALCS. Bumbry made one appearance as a pinch runner, and struck out in one appearance as a pinch hitter. Over the next three seasons, Bumbry batted .269 (1975), .251 (1976), and .317 (1977), as the Orioles finished in second place in the AL East each year. In 1978, Bumbry broke his leg on a slide into second base during a game against the Texas Rangers on May 12. He missed over 100 games before returning to play five games in September – for the season he only appeared in 33 games, and had a .237 average.

==== 1979 World Series ====
The 1979 Orioles won the AL East, and Bumbry batted .285 with 49 RBIs, 80 runs scored, 37 stolen bases, and 7 home runs. Defensively, he started 127 games in the outfield (all but one in center field) and had a .984 fielding percentage. In the ALCS the Orioles defeated the then California Angels in four games – Bumbry was the center fielder in each game, and batted 4-for-16 (.250) in the series. Bumbry made a costly error in the ninth inning of ALCS Game 3, getting a glove on but dropping a Bobby Grich line drive that allowed Rod Carew to score the tying run. The Angels won the game on a walk-off hit during the next at bat, but the Orioles won Game 4 convincingly and spared Bumbry.

The 1979 World Series went the full seven games, with the Orioles losing to the Pittsburgh Pirates despite leading the series 3–1, as the Pirates won the final three games. Bumbry appeared in center field in all seven games – four as a starter, and entering as a pinch hitter in the other three – for the series he batted .143 (3-for-21).

==== 1980 All-Star season ====
Bumbry hit well throughout the 1980 season; he played in all but two of the Orioles' games, including 152 complete games as center fielder and batting leadoff. At the end of May he was batting .349, and .326 at the end of June. Bumbry was selected as an All-Star; he and pitcher Steve Stone represented the Orioles on the AL squad. The 1980 All-Star Game was played on July 8 at Dodger Stadium and was won by the National League (NL) 4–2. Bumbry entered the game defensively in center field in the bottom of the 5th inning; he batted once, grounding out in the 8th inning. During the second half of the season, Bumbry continued to hit well, and he finished the year with a .318 average and career highs in RBIs (53), runs scored (118), stolen bases (44), walks (78), and hits (205). He was the first Oriole to collect 200 hits in a season – Bob Dillinger had last accomplished the feat in 1948 when the franchise was still the St. Louis Browns. Bumbry had a .990 fielding percentage, and he received some consideration during AL Most Valuable Player voting, finishing 13th; the award was won by George Brett.

Both the 1981 and 1982 seasons found the Orioles finishing a single game behind the Milwaukee Brewers in the AL East. Bumbry hit .273 in 1981, and .262 in 1982, while continuing to be the team's primary leadoff hitter. Defensively, he continued to play predominantly in center field, and had .992 and .986 fielding percentages.

==== 1983 World Series championship ====
The Orioles won the AL East in 1983, with Bumbry batting .275 with 31 RBIs, 63 runs scored, 12 stolen bases, and 3 home runs. Defensively, he started 95 games in the outfield (all but one in center field) and had a .981 fielding percentage. Bumbry continued to bat leadoff when he started games, however manager Joe Altobelli substituted for him fairly often; of the 95 games Bumbry started, he only completed 44 of them. In the ALCS the Orioles defeated the Chicago White Sox in four games. Bumbry was the starting center fielder in the first and third games, and he pinch ran in the fourth game – overall he batted 1-for-8 (.125). In the 1983 World Series the Orioles defeated the Philadelphia Phillies in five games, for their first championship since 1970. Bumbry was the starting center fielder in each game except for the third game, which he did not play in. He batted 1-for-11 (.091) during the series, and was substituted for in each game.

In 1984, the Orioles dropped to fifth place in the AL East, and Bumbry batted .270 while appearing in 119 games. He still hit leadoff when he started games, but of 99 starts he only had 44 complete games played. He became a free agent after the conclusion of the season when the Orioles on September 28, 1984, elected to let his contract expire.

Overall, Bumbry spent 13 of his 14 MLB seasons with the Orioles, appearing in 1428 games and batting .283 with 392 RBIs, 772 runs scored, 252 stolen bases, and 53 home runs. Through the end of the 2016 season, his stolen base total is the 4th highest in Orioles franchise history, and runs scored is 9th highest.

=== San Diego Padres ===
In March 1985, Bumbry signed with the San Diego Padres, whose regular left fielder, Carmelo Martínez, was recovering from hand surgery. When Martínez missed the first five games of the season, Bumbry started three games in left field, but after Martínez joined the club, Bumbry was mostly used as a pinch hitter. For the season, Bumbry appeared in 68 games – starting six games in left field and four games in center field – while batting .200 with ten RBIs, six runs scored, two stolen bases, and one home run. Bumbry retired after the season ended, finishing his MLB career with 1,496 games played, with 54 home runs, 402 RBI and a .281 batting average. Defensively, he recorded a .986 fielding percentage playing at all three outfield positions.

== Coaching career ==
Bumbry served as the first base coach for three MLB teams; Boston Red Sox (1988–1993), Baltimore Orioles (1995), and Cleveland Indians (1998, and 2002 from July through the end of the season). In 2007, he served as the outfield and base running coach for the independent league York Revolution.

== Personal ==
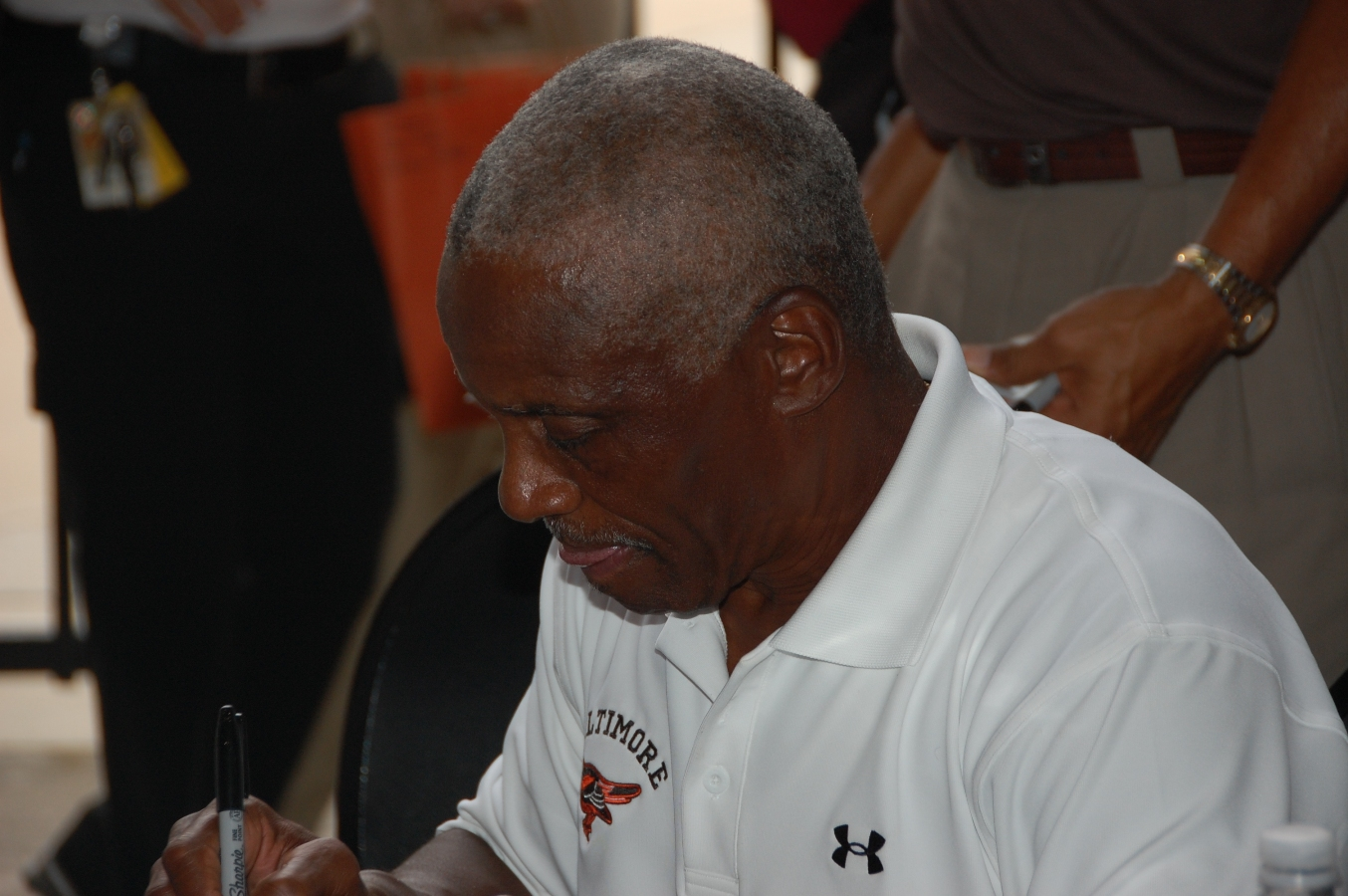
Bumbry in 2008

Bumbry was inducted into the Baltimore Orioles Hall of Fame in 1987, and the Virginia Sports Hall of Fame in 2002. He is the co-owner of a sports memorabilia store in Timonium, Maryland. His son, outfielder Steve Bumbry, was picked by the Orioles in the 12th round of the 2009 Major League Baseball draft, and played for several minor league and independent teams from 2009 through 2014.

== See also ==
- List of Major League Baseball annual triples leaders

Preceded by Walt Hriniak	Boston Red Sox First-Base Coach; 1988–1993	Succeeded by Frank White
Preceded by Davey Lopes	Baltimore Orioles First-Base Coach; 1995	Succeeded by John Stearns
Preceded by Dave Nelson; Robby Thompson	Cleveland Indians First-Base Coach; 1998; 2002	Succeeded by Brian Graham; Jeff Datz
