= Mike Young (baseball) =

American baseball player (1960–2023)

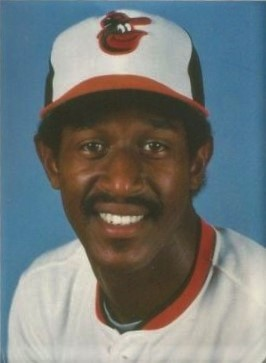
- Young in 1987
- Outfielder / Designated hitter
- Born: March 20, 1960; Oakland, California, U.S.
- Died: May 28, 2023 (aged 63); Atílio Vivacqua, Espírito Santo, Brazil
- Batted: Switch Threw: Right

MLB debut
- September 14, 1982, for the Baltimore Orioles

Last MLB appearance
- September 30, 1989, for the Cleveland Indians

MLB statistics
- Batting average: .247
- Home runs: 72
- Runs batted in: 235
- Stats at Baseball Reference

Teams
- Baltimore Orioles (1982–1987); Philadelphia Phillies (1988); Milwaukee Brewers (1988); Cleveland Indians (1989); Hiroshima Toyo Carp (1990)

Michael Darren Young (March 20, 1960 – May 28, 2023) was an American professional baseball player.

== Career ==
Young played all or part of eight seasons in Major League Baseball, from 1982 to 1989, mostly as an outfielder and designated hitter. He played for the Baltimore Orioles for most of his major league career, but also played for the Philadelphia Phillies, Milwaukee Brewers, and Cleveland Indians. In 1990, he played in Japan for the Hiroshima Toyo Carp.

Young's best season was 1985, when he hit .273 with 28 home runs and 81 runs batted in for the Orioles. On May 28, 1987, Young became the fifth player in major league history to hit two extra-inning home runs in one game. He homered in the 10th inning and hit a walk-off home run in the 12th inning to beat the California Angels, 8–7, at Baltimore's Memorial Stadium.

== Death ==
Young died of a heart attack in Atílio Vivacqua, Espírito Santo, Brazil while on a trip visiting his wife's in-laws on May 28, 2023, at the age of 63. He was the first MLB player to die in Brazil.
