= Don Welchel =

American baseball player (born 1957)

- Pitcher
- Born: February 3, 1957 (age 69); Atlanta, Texas, U.S.
- Batted: Right Threw: Right

MLB debut
- September 15, 1982, for the Baltimore Orioles

Last MLB appearance
- May 31, 1983, for the Baltimore Orioles

MLB statistics
- Win–loss record: 1–2
- Earned run average: 5.81
- Strikeouts: 19
- Stats at Baseball Reference

Teams
- Baltimore Orioles (1982–1983)

Donald Ray Welchel (born February 3, 1957) is a former right-handed Major League Baseball pitcher who played for the Baltimore Orioles in 1982 and 1983. He is 6 feet 4 inches (1.93 m) tall and weighs 205 pounds (93 kg).

Welchel grew up in Texas and attended Sam Houston State University. Drafted twice, he signed with the Baltimore Orioles Orioles after being a seventh-round selection in 1978. After ranking among the Southern League leaders in losses in 1980, he ranked among their leaders in wins in 1981. He was called up by the Orioles in 1982 and won his Major League debut on September 15, against the New York Yankees. He began 1983 in their bullpen but appeared in his final Major League game on May 31. After getting sent back to the minors, Welchel pitched until 1988, spending 1986 in the Texas Rangers' organization and 1987 and 1988 in the Kansas City Royals' organization.

== High school and college ==
Prior to playing professionally, Welchel attended Lake Highlands High School in Dallas, Texas, and then Sam Houston State University. He was originally drafted in the 10th round of the 1975 draft by the Cincinnati Reds, however he didn't sign. He was next drafted by the Baltimore Orioles in the seventh round of the 1978 draft, signing that time. He was signed by scout Ray Crone.

== Early Minor League career (1978-82) ==
Welchel began his professional career by starting on Opening Day, 1978, for the rookie Bluefield Orioles of the Appalachian League, throwing seven innings and earning the win in a 4–1 victory over the Paintsville Highlanders. He spent most of the season with Bluefield, posting a 4–5 record, a 2.43 earned run average (ERA), 57 strikeouts, 78 hits allowed, and 89 innings pitched in 12 games (11 starts). He completed seven of his starts. He also pitched two games for the Class A Miami Orioles of the Florida State League, winning both. Welchel split the 1979 season between Miami and the Double-A Charlotte O's of the Southern League. In 14 starts for Miami, he had a 5–6 record, a 2.94 ERA, 53 strikeouts, and 86 hits allowed in 95 innings, throwing complete games in half his outings. In 13 starts with Charlotte, he had a 5–4 record, a 3.87 ERA, 40 strikeouts, and 95 hits allowed in 87 innings.

Welchel spent all of 1980 in Charlotte, tying for seventh in the Southern League with 12 losses, as opposed to nine wins. He did finish fourth in the league with a 2.90 ERA, behind Andy McGaffigan's 2.38, Ron Meridith's 2.54, and Bryn Smith's 2.78. He was second in the league with 202 innings pitched, one behind Steve Bedrosian, and he led the league in hits allowed. Despite throwing 202 innings, he only struck out 56 batters.

In 1981, Welchel spent most of the season at Charlotte. This time, he tied with three other pitchers for third in the league with 13 wins, behind Craig McMurtry's 15 and Storm Davis's 14. He was also fifth in the league with a 2.91 ERA, and he upped his strikeout total to 90, this time in 161 innings. He was called up to the Triple-A Rochester Red Wings to work out of the bullpen, appearing in eight games for the club. He spent most of 1982 with the Red Wings, making 25 starts in 30 appearances. He tied with Jim Lewis and Don Cooper for fourth in the league with 12 wins, lost seven games, had a 4.64 ERA, struck out 82, and ranked seventh in the league with 180 hits and 163 innings.

== Baltimore Orioles (1982-83) ==
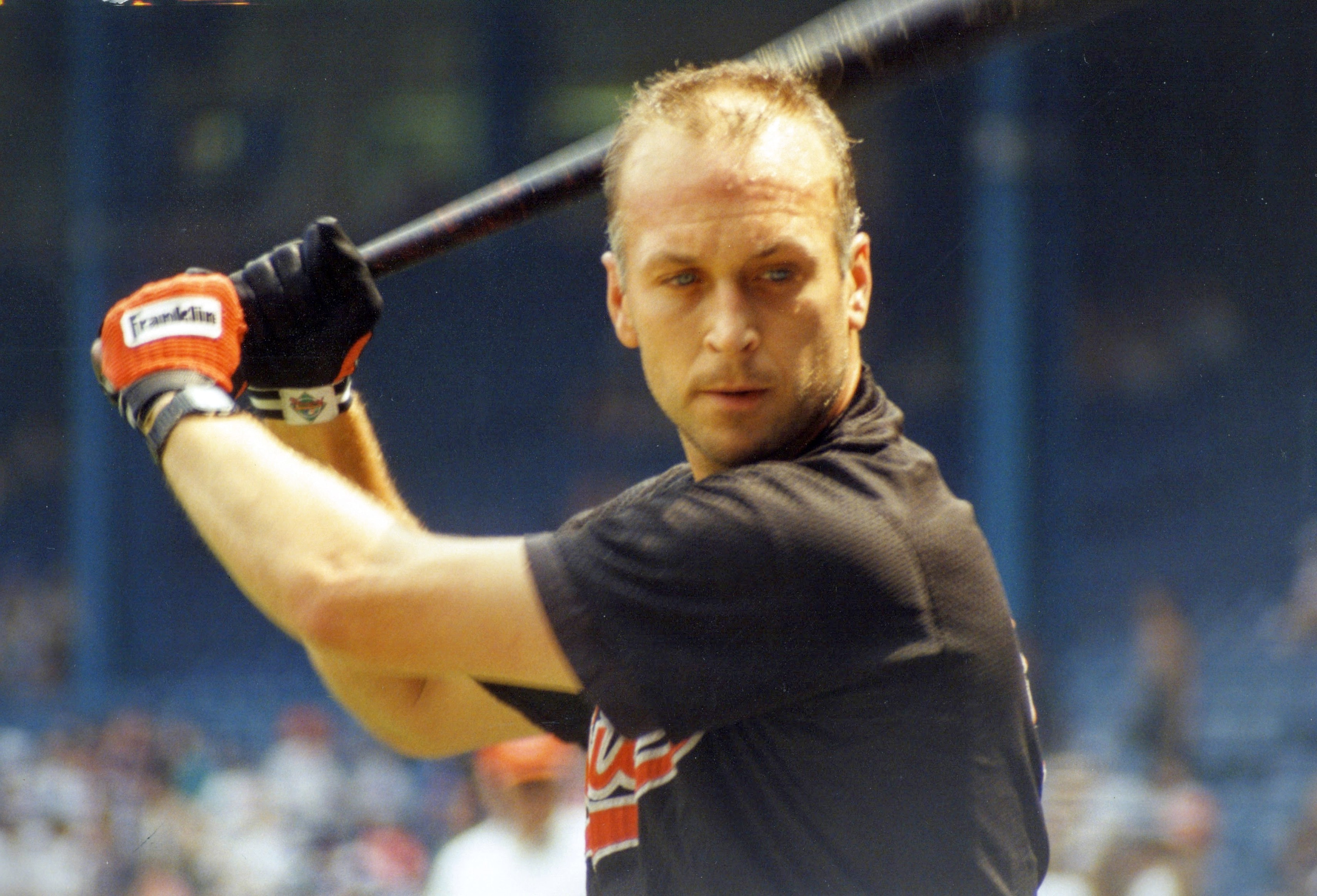
A double by Cal Ripken Jr., helped Welchel earn his first win.

Welchel was called up by the Orioles late in the season and made his big league debut on September 15, 1982, against the New York Yankees. As a relief pitcher, he earned the win in his first big league game. A double by Cal Ripken Jr., tied the game, setting up the win for Welchel, and Welchel said after the game, "I was very happy that Cal had a big part in my first win. We go back a long time." He pitched one more game in the big leagues that season, going a combined 1–0 with an 8.31 ERA.

Welchel began 1983 with the Orioles. He made 11 relief appearances for them, going 0–2 with a 5.40 ERA. On May 31, he appeared in his final game, allowing three runs in 2 1/3 innings of relief in a 10–3 loss to the Minnesota Twins. He spent the rest of the season in Rochester, where, despite posting an identical 4.64 ERA and making just 18 starts, he managed to tie four other pitchers for second in the league with 12 losses (behind Tim Leary's 16).

Overall, Welchel spent 13 games in the big leagues over two years, going 1–2 with a 5.81 ERA. In 31 innings he allowed 39 hits and 12 walks, while striking out 19.

== Later Minor League career (1984-88) ==
An injury limited Welchel to 13 minor league games in 1984. In nine starts with Rochester, he went 4–5 with a 4.42 ERA, walking more batters (32) than he struck out (29). On a four-game stint with the Class A Hagerstown Suns with the Carolina League, he fared better, winning all four games. He appeared in 26 games for Rochester in 1985, 19 of which were starts. He had a 7–4 record, a 3.75 ERA, 63 strikeouts, and 123 hits allowed in 117 2/3 innings.

That would be Welchel's last year in the Orioles' organization. He spent 1986 with the Oklahoma City 89ers, the Triple-A American Association affiliate of the Texas Rangers. He tied with Rodger Cole and Doug Potestio for third in the league with 12 wins, behind Pete Filson's 14 and Alan Hargesheimer's 13. His 3.99 ERA ranked seventh in the league, he ranked eighth with 160 innings pitched, and he finished sixth with 95 strikeouts.

Welchel spent 1987 and 1988 in the Kansas City Royals' organization, pitching for the American Association's Omaha Royals. In 19 starts in 1987, he had a 7–4 record, a 4.82 ERA, 70 strikeouts, and 126 hits allowed in 112 innings. Next year, he spent most of the season in the bullpen, starting only eight of his 37 appearances, winning a mere four games, and only logging 97 innings. Despite pitching fewer innings, he had more strikeouts in 1988 (71) than in 1987. However, despite making only eight starts Welchel tied Len Damian for third in the league with 11 losses, behind John Martin's 13 and Dave Johnson's 12.

1988 would be Welchel's final season. In 11 seasons pitching in the minor leagues, from 1978 to 1988, he went a combined 93–87 with a 3.64 ERA in 267 games (217 starts).
