= Chris Davis =

Christopher or Chris Davis may refer to:

== Sports ==
=== American football ===
- Chris Davis (linebacker) (born 1963), American football linebacker
- Chris Davis (running back) (born 1979), American football fullback
- Chris Davis (wide receiver, born 1983), American football wide receiver
- Chris Davis (wide receiver, born 1984), American football wide receiver
- Chris Davis (cornerback) (born 1990), American football cornerback

=== Other sports ===
- Chris Davis (baseball) (born 1986), Major League Baseball player
- Chris Davis (fighter) (born 1982), American mixed martial artist
- Chris Davis, Canadian ice hockey player drafted by the Buffalo Sabres in 1993
- Christopher Martin Davis (born 1994), Bulgarian ice dancer

== Other ==
- Christopher James Davis (1842–1870), doctor and member of the Plymouth Brethren
- Christopher Lawrence Davis (1875–1951), American farmer, businessman, and politician
- Chris Davis (politician) (born 1953), Liberal National Party of Queensland politician
- Christopher Davis (politician), Connecticut state legislator
- Christopher Davis (writer) (born 1953), American author
- Chris Davis (musician), British singer and guitarist
- Jon Christopher Davis (born 1968), American singer songwriter
- Chris Davis, guitarist for the band Texas in July
- Lynching of Christopher Davis
- Chris Davis, Democratic candidate for the 2024 District 7 U.S. House of Representatives elections in Alabama

== See also ==
- Christopher Davies (disambiguation)
- Christine Davis (disambiguation)
- Christina Davis (disambiguation)
- Khris Davis (born 1987), American professional baseball player
- Khris Davis (actor), American actor
- Kris Davis (born 1980), Canadian jazz pianist and composer
