= Bottom of the 9th =

1996 video game

- North American Nintendo 64 cover art
- Developer: Konami Computer Entertainment Chicago
- Publisher: Konami
- Artist: Greg Orduyan
- Platforms: PlayStation, Sega Saturn, Nintendo 64
- Release: PlayStation: NA: April 4, 1996; JP: October 25, 1996; Saturn: NA: October 18, 1996; Nintendo 64: NA: April 14, 1999
- Genre: Sports
- Modes: Single player, multiplayer

Bottom of the 9th is a baseball video game released by Konami for the PlayStation in 1996. Later the same year it was ported to the Sega Saturn and in 1999 to the Nintendo 64. The sequels Bottom of the 9th '97 and Bottom of the 9th '99 were released for the PlayStation. The game is part of Konami's XXL Sports brand.

== Gameplay ==
One of the earliest in Konami's franchise, this version features 300 actual MLB players, but does not feature the MLB licensed teams. Players can choose to either play against a friend in Exhibition, Season or Playoffs. The gameplay is geared for more of a simulation style of play, with the players stats determining how well they hit, pitch and field.

Along with the standard modes for a baseball game, this one also features the ability to customize teams and choose any player to create a "Dream Team". It also has a variety of different camera angles, a "Streak Bar" that shows a batter's hitting ability, and a "Pitching Bar" that shows whether a pitcher is fatigued. It is notable for being the first baseball game released in North America to utilize a batting cursor.

== Reception ==
Reception

Review scores
Publication	Score
Electronic Gaming Monthly	6.75/10 (N64) (Note: In Electronic Gaming Monthly's review of the Nintendo 64 port, two critics gave it a 6/10, one a 7/10, and another an 8/10.); 5.5/10 (PS1)
Next Generation	4/5 (PS1)

Bottom of the 9th received mixed reviews. Critics commented that the screen is too cluttered with info, the graphics in general are below average, and the controls (particularly the unusual batting system) are difficult to get a handle on. However, critics for Next Generation and GamePro felt the controls and steep challenge of the game ultimately make it more realistic, and that mastering the unusual controls ultimately pays off with a deeper gaming experience, with GamePro concluding that "Serious baseball fiends will enjoy this ballpark's authentic, challenging gameplay". The two sports reviewers of Electronic Gaming Monthly instead argued that the steep learning curve makes Bottom of the 9th less worthwhile than more immediately accessible games.

GamePro described the Saturn version as "an impressively exact port ... with both the flaws (quirky graphics and tricky controls) and high points (excellent gameplay) of the original." They noted that despite the fact that the 1996 baseball season had started, the Saturn version had not updated the rosters.
