= Christine Davis (disambiguation) =

Christine Davis (born 1960) is a Canadian artist.

Christine Davis may also refer to:

- Christine Davis, producer of Busytown Mysteries
- Christine Davis, a character in Stepfather III
- Christine Davis, a character played by Erin Daniels

== See also ==
- Anne-Christine Davis, scientist
- Christina Davis (disambiguation)
- Chris Davis (disambiguation)
