= List of Baltimore Orioles team records =

The Baltimore Orioles are an American professional baseball team based in Baltimore. The Orioles originally formed as the Milwaukee Brewers in 1894, moving to St. Louis after the 1901 season, becoming the St. Louis Browns. Finally, after 52 years as the Browns, the franchise was acquired by a partnership of Baltimore businessmen who renamed the team the Baltimore Orioles.

As the Brewers, Browns, and Orioles the franchise have participated in 126 seasons in the American League, making the playoffs 16 times, winning 7 pennants and 3 World Series championships (against the Los Angeles Dodgers in 1966, the Cincinnati Reds in 1970, and the Philadelphia Phillies in 1983). Through September 27, 2026 they have played 19,527 games, winning 9,274 and losing 10,253 for a win-loss record of 0.475.

Cal Ripken Jr. holds the most team records with 13, including hits, runs, RBIs, doubles, and home runs. The slugger, nicknamed "The Iron Man", also holds the record for consecutive games played (2,632), surpassing Lou Gehrig on September 6, 1995 with his 2,131st consecutive game played. Jim Palmer holds the most pitching records for the Orioles, including wins, games played, strikeouts, and shutouts. Palmer is the only pitcher in Major League history to win World Series games in three decades, and over his 558 games played never surrendered a single grand slam.

This is a list of team records for the Baltimore Orioles. Records from or before 1901 were as the Milwaukee Brewers, and between 1902 and 1954 as the St. Louis Browns.

== Individual Career Records ==
These are the individual records for Batting and Pitching over the course of player's careers with the franchise.

Statistics are current through 2022 season.

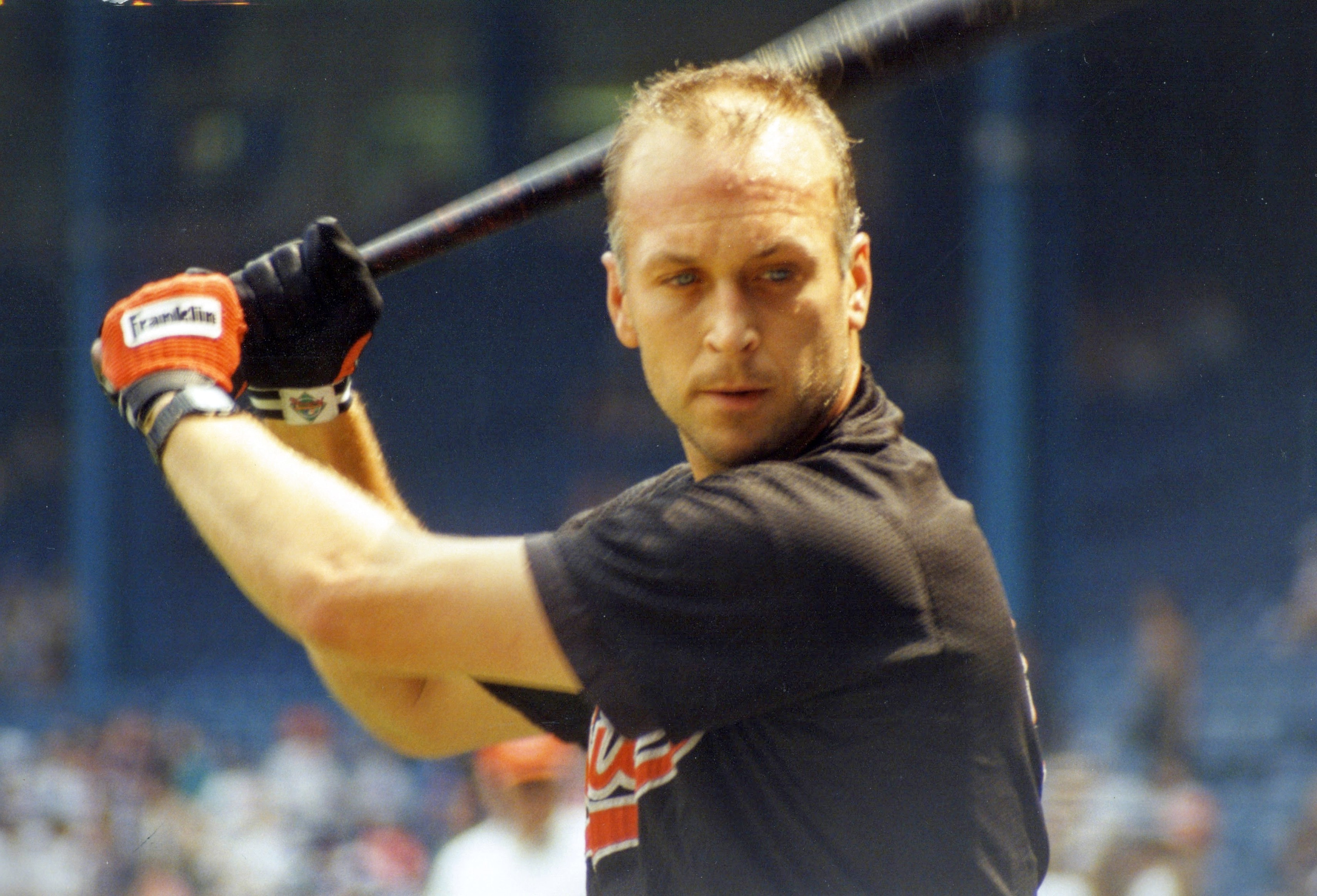
Cal Ripken Jr. is the Orioles All-Time leader in hits, runs, RBIs, and home runs and more

=== Career Batting ===
Career Batting Leaders
Statistic	Player	Record	Orioles Career	Ref
Batting average	Heinie Manush	.362	1928-1929, 1930	
On-Base percentage	Goose Goslin	.404	1930-1932	
Slugging percentage	Ken Williams	.558	1918-1927	
OPS	Ken Williams	.961	1918-1927	
Games Played	Cal Ripken Jr.	3,001	1981-2001	
At Bats	Cal Ripken Jr.	11,551	1981-2001	
Plate Appearances	Cal Ripken Jr.	12,883	1981-2001	
Runs Scored	Cal Ripken Jr.	1,647	1981-2001	
Hits	Cal Ripken Jr.	3,184	1981-2001	
Total Bases	Cal Ripken Jr.	5,168	1981-2001	
Singles	Cal Ripken Jr.	2,106	1981-2001	
Doubles	Cal Ripken Jr.	603	1981-2001	
Triples	Cal Ripken Jr.	145	1981-2001	
Home Runs	Cal Ripken Jr.	431	1981-2001	
RBI	Cal Ripken Jr.	1,695	1981-2001	
Bases on Balls	Cal Ripken Jr.	1,129	1981-2001	
Strikeouts	Chris Davis	1,550	2011-2020	
Stolen Bases	George Sisler	351	1915-1927	
Caught Stealing	George Sisler	127	1915-1927	
Extra Base Hits	Cal Ripken Jr.	1,078	1981-2001	
Hit By Pitch	Brady Anderson	148	1988-2001	
Sacrifice Hits	Jimmy Austin	223	1911-1923, 1925-1926, 1929	
Sacrifice Flies	Cal Ripken Jr.	127	1981-2001	
Intentional Bases on Balls	Eddie Murray	135	1977-1988, 1996	

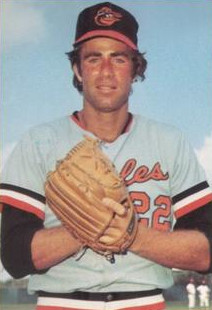
Jim Palmer is one of the most successful pitchers in Orioles history, leading the franchise in career wins, strikeouts, and shutouts.

=== Career Pitching ===
Career Pitching Leaders
Statistic	Player	Record	Orioles Career	Ref
ERA	Harry Howell	2.06	1904-1910	
Wins	Jim Palmer	268	1965-1984	
Losses	Jim Palmer	152	1965-1984	
Win-Loss%	Steve Stone	.656	1979-1981	
Games Played	Jim Palmer	558	1965-1984	
Innings Pitched	Jim Palmer	3,948	1965-1984	
Games Started	Jim Palmer	521	1965-1984	
Complete Games	Jim Palmer	211	1965-1984	
Saves	Gregg Olson	160	1988-1993	
Shutouts	Jim Palmer	53	1965-1984	
Strikeouts	Jim Palmer	2212	1965-1984	
K/9	Dylan Bundy	8.819	2016-2019	
Bases on Balls	Jim Palmer	1311	1965-1984	
BB/9	Dick Hall	1.473	1961-1966	
Hits	Jim Palmer	3,349	1965-1984	
H/9	Stu Miller	6.902	1963-1968	
WHIP	Dick Hall	1.005	1961-1966	
Home Runs	Jim Palmer	303	1965-1984	
HR/9	Rube Waddell	0.033	1908-1910	
Earned Runs	Jim Palmer	1,253	1965-1984	
Wild Pitches	Jim Palmer	85	1965-1984	
Hit By Pitch	Barney Pelty	100	1903-1911	
Batters Faced	Jim Palmer	16,114	1965-1984	

== Individual Single-Season Records ==
These are the individual records for Batting and Pitching in a single season with the franchise.

Statistics are current through 2022 season.

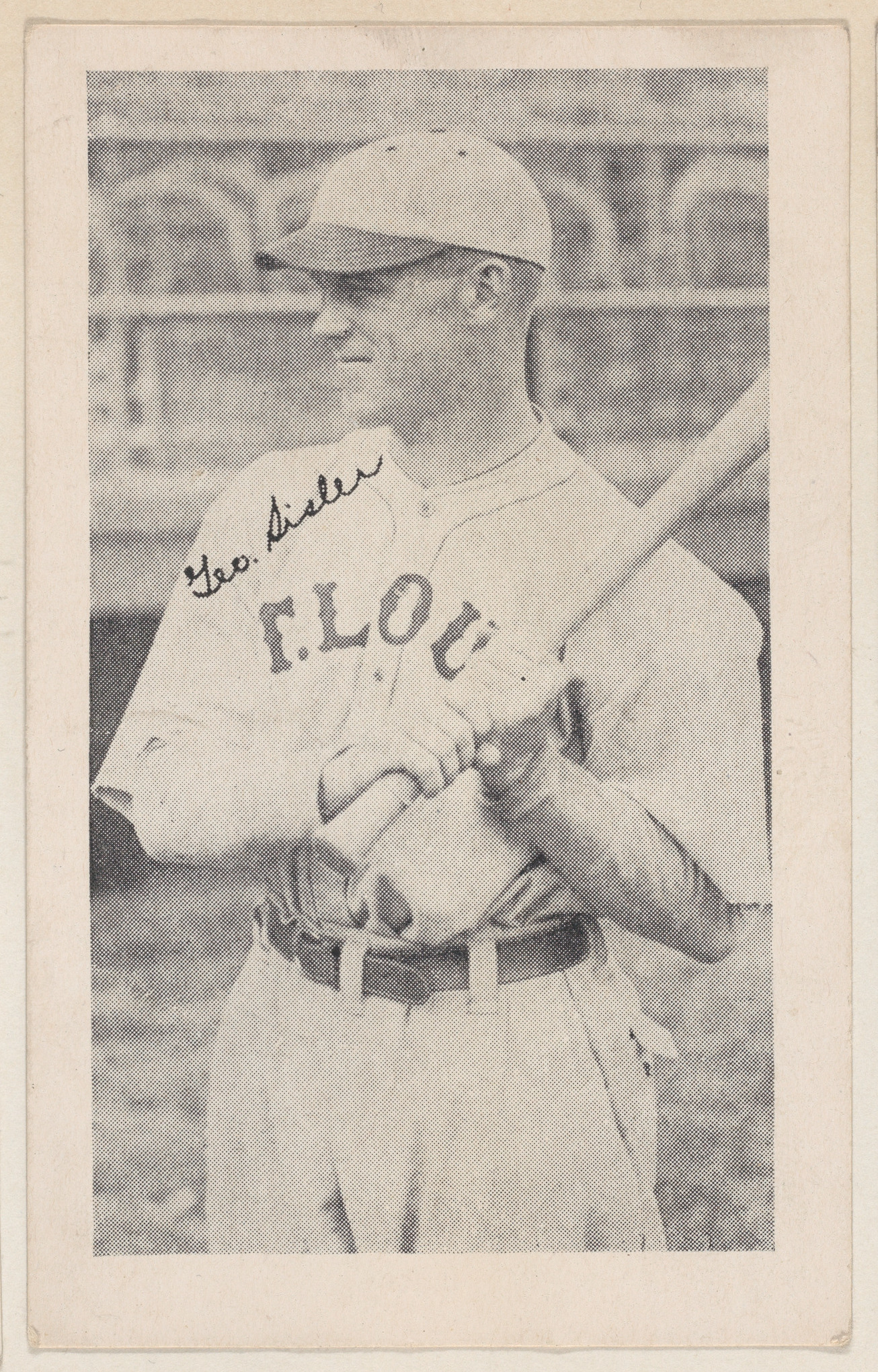
George Sisler holds several franchise single-season batting records, including batting average, OPS, and hits

=== Single-Season Batting ===
Single Season Batting Leaders
Statistic	Player	Record	Season	Ref
Batting average	George Sisler	.420	1922	
On-Base percentage	George Sisler	.467	1920	
Slugging percentage	Jim Gentile	.646	1961	
OPS	George Sisler	1.082	1920	
Games Played	Cal Ripken Jr. Brooks Robinson	163	1996; 1961, 1964	
At Bats	B.J. Surhoff	673	1999	
Plate Appearances	Brady Anderson	749	1992	
Runs Scored	Harlond Clift	145	1936	
Hits	George Sisler	257	1920	
Total Bases	George Sisler	399	1920	
Singles	Jack Tobin	179	1921	
Doubles	Brian Roberts	56	2009	
Triples	Heinie Manush; George Stone	20	1928; 1906	
Home Runs	Chris Davis	53	2013	
RBI	Ken Williams	155	1922	
Bases on Balls	Lu Blue	126	1929	
Strikeouts	Chris Davis	219	2016	
Stolen Bases	Luis Aparicio	57	1964	
Caught Stealing	Burt Shotton	32	1915	
Extra Base Hits	Chris Davis	96	2013	
Hit By Pitch	Brady Anderson	24	1999	
Sacrifice Hits	Joe Gedeon	48	1920	
Sacrifice Flies	Bobby Bonilla	17	1996	
Intentional Bases on Balls	Eddie Murray	25	1984	

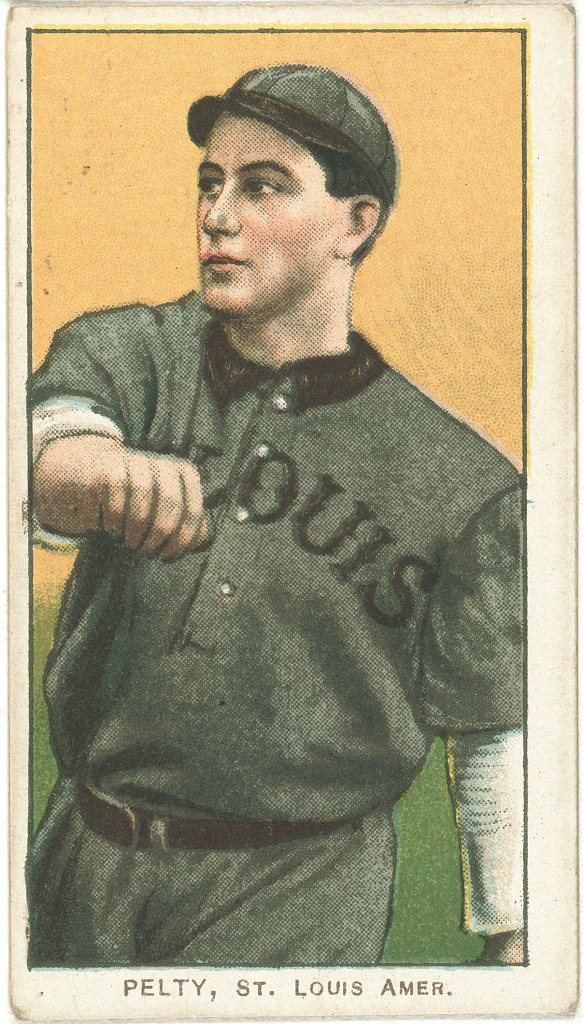
Barney Pelty holds the single-season ERA record for the franchise, and the ignoble record for most batters hit in a season

=== Single-Season Pitching ===
Single Season Pitching Leaders
Statistic	Player	Record	Season	Ref
ERA	Barney Pelty	1.59	1906	
Wins	Urban Shocker	27	1921	
Losses	Fred Glade	25	1905	
Win-Loss%	General Crowder; Dave McNally	.808	1928; 1971	
Games Played	Jamie Walker	81	2007	
Innings Pitched	Urban Shocker	348.0	1922	
Games Started	Mike Flanagan^{[a]}	40	1978	
Complete Games	Jack Powell	36	1902	
Saves	Jim Johnson	51	2012	
Shutouts	Jim Palmer	10	1975	
Strikeouts	Rube Waddell	232	1908	
K/9	Érik Bédard	10.929	2007	
Bases on Balls	Bobo Newsom	192	1938	
BB/9	Scott McGregor	1.185	1979	
Hits	Urban Shocker	365	1922	
H/9	Dave McNally	5.769	1968	
WHIP	Dave McNally	0.842	1968	
Home Runs	Dylan Bundy	41	2018	
HR/9	Harry Howell	0.028	1908	
Earned Runs	Bobo Newsom	186	1938	
Wild Pitches	Daniel Cabrera	17	2006	
Hit By Pitch	Barney Pelty	20	1904	
Batters Faced	Bobo Newsom	1,475	1938	

== Team Single-Season Records ==
These are the team records for batting and pitching in a single-season.

=== Team Season Batting ===
Season Batting Records
Statistic	Record	Season
Batting Average	.313	1922
Home runs	257	1996
Runs	949	1996
Hits	1,693	1922
Doubles	327	1937
Triples	106	1921
Strikeouts	1,518	2026
Stolen bases	234	1916

=== Team Season Pitching ===
Season Pitching Records
Statistic	Record	Season
ERA	2.15	1908
Strikeouts	1,431	2023
Shutouts	21	1961; 1909
Most hits allowed	1,776	1936
Most runs allowed	1,064	1936
Most home runs allowed	305	2019

== Team All-Time Records ==
These are the all time totals for the franchise as of 09/27/2026. These records include statistics of the St. Louis Browns (1902–1953) and Milwaukee Brewers (1894–1901).

Regular Season Records
Statistic	Record	MLB Rank
Wins	9,274	16
Losses	10,253	7
W-L%	.475	27
Divisions Won	10	T10
Pennants Won	7	13
World Series Wins	3	T11
Home runs	14,769	7
Runs	84,816	16
Hits	171,880	15
Batting average	.258	18
ERA	4.05	21
Runs allowed	90,327	9

== Notes ==
^{[a]} Flanagan shares the single-season games started record with: Jim Palmer (1976), Mike Cuellar (1970), Dave McNally (1969, 1970), and Bobo Newsom (1938)
