= Christopher Davies =

Christopher or Chris Davies may refer to:

- Chris Davies (Liberal Democrat politician) (born 1954), UK politician
- Chris Davies (Conservative politician) (born 1967), Conservative MP for Brecon and Radnorshire, 2015–19
- Christopher Davies (sailor) (born 1946), British sailor
- Christopher Davies (Australian cricketer) (born 1978), Australian cricketer
- Christopher Davies (South African cricketer) (1952–2002), South African cricketer
- Chris Davies (New Zealand cricketer) (born 1980), New Zealand cricketer
- Chris Davies (football coach) (born 1985), English football coach
- Chris Davies (rugby league) (born 1991), Welsh rugby league footballer

== See also ==
- Chris Davis (disambiguation)
