= List of Baltimore Orioles awards =

This is a list of award winners and single-season league leaders for the Baltimore Orioles professional baseball team.

== Abbreviations ==
- P: pitcher
- C: catcher
- 1B: first baseman
- 2B: second baseman
- 3B: third baseman
- SS: shortstop
- LF: left fielder
- CF: center fielder
- RF: right fielder
- IF: infielder
- OF: outfielder
- DH: designated hitter
- UTIL: utility

== National Baseball Hall of Fame ==
See: Baltimore Orioles § Baseball Hall of Famers.

== Awards ==
=== MVP Award (AL) winners ===
Note: This was re-named the Kenesaw Mountain Landis Memorial Baseball Award in 1944.

- 1964: Brooks Robinson
- 1966: Frank Robinson
- 1970: Boog Powell
- 1983: Cal Ripken Jr.
- 1991: Cal Ripken Jr.

=== Cy Young Award (AL) winners ===
- 1969: Mike Cuellar
- 1973: Jim Palmer
- 1975: Jim Palmer
- 1976: Jim Palmer
- 1979: Mike Flanagan
- 1980: Steve Stone

=== Rookie of the Year Award (AL) winners ===
Note: This was re-named the Jackie Robinson Award in 1987.

- 1960: Ron Hansen
- 1965: Curt Blefary
- 1973: Al Bumbry
- 1977: Eddie Murray
- 1982: Cal Ripken Jr.
- 1989: Gregg Olson
- 2023: Gunnar Henderson

=== Manager of the Year Award (AL) ===
See footnote

- 1989: Frank Robinson
- 1997: Davey Johnson
- 2014: Buck Showalter
- 2023: Brandon Hyde

=== Silver Slugger Award (AL) winners ===
- 1983: Eddie Murray (1b) – Cal Ripken Jr. (ss)
- 1984: Eddie Murray (1b) – Cal Ripken Jr. (ss)
- 1985: Cal Ripken Jr. (ss)
- 1986: Cal Ripken Jr. (ss)
- 1989: Cal Ripken Jr. (ss) - Mickey Tettleton (C)
- 1991: Cal Ripken Jr. (ss)
- 1993: Cal Ripken Jr. (ss)
- 1994: Cal Ripken Jr. (ss)
- 1996: Roberto Alomar (2b)
- 1998: Rafael Palmeiro (1b)
- 2004: Miguel Tejada (ss) - Melvin Mora (3B)
- 2005: Miguel Tejada
- 2008: Aubrey Huff (dh)
- 2013: Chris Davis (1b) – J. J. Hardy (ss) – Adam Jones (cf)
- 2016: Mark Trumbo (DH)
- 2021: Cedric Mullins (of)
- 2023: Gunnar Henderson (util) − Adley Rutschman (c)
- 2024: Anthony Santander (of)
- 2026: Pete Alonso (1b)

=== Gold Glove Award (AL) winners ===
- 1960: Brooks Robinson (3b)
- 1961: Brooks Robinson (3b)
- 1962: Brooks Robinson (3b)
- 1963: Brooks Robinson (3b)
- 1964: Brooks Robinson (3b) – Luis Aparicio (ss)
- 1965: Brooks Robinson (3b)
- 1966: Brooks Robinson (3b) – Luis Aparicio (ss)
- 1967: Brooks Robinson (3b) – Paul Blair (of)
- 1968: Brooks Robinson (3b)
- 1969: Davey Johnson (2b) – Brooks Robinson (3b) – Mark Belanger (ss) - Paul Blair (of)
- 1970: Davey Johnson (2b) – Brooks Robinson (3b) – Paul Blair (of)
- 1971: Davey Johnson (2b) – Brooks Robinson (3b) – Paul Blair (of) – Mark Belanger (ss)
- 1972: Brooks Robinson (3b) – Paul Blair (of)
- 1973: Brooks Robinson (3b) – Paul Blair (of) – Bobby Grich (2b) – Mark Belanger (ss)
- 1974: Brooks Robinson (3b) – Paul Blair (of) – Bobby Grich (2b) – Mark Belanger (ss)
- 1975: Brooks Robinson (3b) – Paul Blair (of) – Bobby Grich (2b) – Mark Belanger (ss)
- 1976: Jim Palmer (p) – Bobby Grich (2b) – Mark Belanger (ss)
- 1977: Jim Palmer (p) – Mark Belanger (ss)
- 1978: Jim Palmer (p) – Mark Belanger (ss)
- 1979: Jim Palmer (p)
- 1982: Eddie Murray (1b)
- 1983: Eddie Murray (1b)
- 1984: Eddie Murray (1b)
- 1991: Cal Ripken Jr. (ss)
- 1992: Cal Ripken Jr. (ss)
- 1996: Mike Mussina (p) – Roberto Alomar (2b)
- 1997: Mike Mussina (p) – Rafael Palmeiro (1b)
- 1998: Mike Mussina (p) – Rafael Palmeiro (1b) – Roberto Alomar (2b)
- 1999: Mike Mussina (p)
- 2009: Adam Jones (of)
- 2011: Matt Wieters (c) – Nick Markakis (of)
- 2012: Adam Jones (of) – Matt Wieters (c) – J. J. Hardy (ss)
- 2013: Manny Machado (3b) – J. J. Hardy (ss) – Adam Jones (cf)
- 2014: Nick Markakis (of) Adam Jones (of) – J. J. Hardy (ss)
- 2015: Manny Machado (3b)
- 2022: Ramón Urías (3b)

=== All-MLB Team ===
- 2023: Adley Rutschman (c) – Kyle Bradish (sp) – Félix Bautista (rp)
- 2024: Corbin Burnes (sp)
- 2026: Pete Alonso (1b)

=== Wilson Defensive Player of the Year Award ===
See explanatory note at Atlanta Braves.
Team (at all positions)

- (2012)
- (2013)

=== Relief Man of the Year Award ===
See footnote.

- 1994: Lee Smith
- 1997: Randy Myers
- 2012: Jim Johnson

=== Mariano Rivera AL Reliever of the Year Award ===
- 2016: Zach Britton
- 2023: Félix Bautista

=== Edgar Martínez Award (designated hitter) ===
- 1974: Tommy Davis
- 2008: Aubrey Huff

=== Roberto Clemente Award ===
- 1972: Brooks Robinson
- 1982: Ken Singleton
- 1992: Cal Ripken Jr.
- 1997: Eric Davis

=== All-Star Game MVP Award ===
Note: This was re-named the Ted Williams Most Valuable Player Award in 2002.

- 1958: Billy O'Dell
- 1991: Cal Ripken Jr.
- 2001: Cal Ripken Jr.
- 2005: Miguel Tejada

=== All-Star Game — Home Run Derby champion ===
See: Home Run Derby

- 1991: Cal Ripken Jr.
- 2004: Miguel Tejada

=== DHL Hometown Heroes (2006) ===
- Cal Ripken Jr. – voted by MLB fans as the most outstanding player in the history of the franchise, based on on-field performance, leadership quality and character value

=== MLB All-Century Team (1999) ===
- 3B: Brooks Robinson
- SS: Cal Ripken Jr.

=== MLB All-Time Team (1997; Baseball Writers' Association of America) ===
- Brooks Robinson (first team; third baseman)
- Cal Ripken Jr. (first team; shortstop)

=== The Sporting News (TSN) Player of the Year ===
- 1966: Frank Robinson
- 1983: Cal Ripken Jr.
- 1991: Cal Ripken Jr.

=== Sporting News AL Reliever of the Year Award ===
See footnote

=== Hutch Award ===
- 1997: Eric Davis

=== Lou Gehrig Memorial Award ===
- 1962: Robin Roberts
- 1966: Brooks Robinson
- 1992: Cal Ripken Jr.

=== Babe Ruth Award (World Series) ===
- 1966: Frank Robinson
- 1970: Brooks Robinson
- 1983: Rick Dempsey

=== TSN Manager of the Year Award ===
Note: Established in 1936, this award was given annually to one manager in Major League Baseball. In 1986 it was expanded to honor one manager from each league.
See footnote

- 1966: Hank Bauer (in MLB)
- 1977: Earl Weaver (in MLB)
- 1979: Earl Weaver (in MLB)
- 1989: Frank Robinson (in AL)
- 1993: Johnny Oates (in AL)
- 1997: Davey Johnson (in AL)
- 2012: Buck Showalter (in AL)

=== Associated Press Manager of the Year Award ===
See: Associated Press Manager of the Year (discontinued in 2001)
See footnote

=== Baseball America Manager of the Year ===
See: Baseball America#Baseball America Manager of the Year

- Buck Showalter (2012)

== Triple Crown Champions ==
=== Batting ===
See: Major League Baseball Triple Crown#Batting Triple Crown winners

- 1966: Frank Robinson (.316, 49, 122)

=== Pitching ===
- N/A

== Post-Season and All-Star Game MVP Award Winners ==
- World Series MVP
  - 1966: Frank Robinson
  - 1970: Brooks Robinson
  - 1983: Rick Dempsey
- AL Championship Series MVP
  Note: This was re-named the Lee MacPhail MVP Award.
  - 1983: Mike Boddicker
- All-Star Game MVP
  Note: This was re-named the Ted Williams Most Valuable Player Award in 2002.
  - 1991: Cal Ripken Jr.
  - 2001: Cal Ripken Jr.
  - 2005: Miguel Tejada

== Team award ==
- 1966 – American League pennant
- 1966 – World Series championship
- 1969 – William Harridge Trophy (American League champion)
- 1970 – William Harridge Trophy (American League champion)
- 1970 – World Series Trophy
- 1971 – William Harridge Trophy (American League champion)
- 1979 – William Harridge Trophy (American League champion)
- 1983 – William Harridge Trophy (American League champion)
- 1983 – World Series Trophy

Achievements
Preceded by Los Angeles Dodgers; New York Mets; St. Louis Cardinals	World Series Champions; 1966; 1970; 1983	Succeeded by St. Louis Cardinals; Pittsburgh Pirates; Detroit Tigers

== Most Valuable Oriole ==
- 1954 – Chuck Diering
- 1955 – Dave Philley
- 1956 – Bob Nieman
- 1957 – Billy Gardner
- 1958 – Gus Triandos
- 1959 – Gene Woodling
- 1960 – Brooks Robinson
- 1961 – Jim Gentile
- 1962 – Brooks Robinson
- 1963 – Stu Miller
- 1964 – Brooks Robinson
- 1965 – Stu Miller
- 1966 – Frank Robinson
- 1967 – Frank Robinson
- 1968 – Dave McNally
- 1969 – Boog Powell
- 1970 – Boog Powell
- 1971 – Brooks Robinson, Frank Robinson
- 1972 – Jim Palmer
- 1973 – Jim Palmer
- 1974 – Paul Blair, Mike Cuellar
- 1975 – Ken Singleton
- 1976 – Lee May
- 1977 – Ken Singleton
- 1978 – Eddie Murray
- 1979 – Ken Singleton
- 1980 – Al Bumbry
- 1981 – Eddie Murray
- 1982 – Eddie Murray
- 1983 – Eddie Murray, Cal Ripken Jr.
- 1984 – Eddie Murray
- 1985 – Eddie Murray
- 1986 – Don Aase
- 1987 – Larry Sheets
- 1988 – Eddie Murray, Cal Ripken Jr.
- 1989 – Gregg Olson
- 1990 – Cal Ripken Jr.
- 1991 – Cal Ripken Jr.
- 1992 – Mike Devereaux
- 1993 – Chris Hoiles
- 1994 – No award given
- 1995 – Rafael Palmeiro
- 1996 – Rafael Palmeiro
- 1997 – Randy Myers
- 1998 – Rafael Palmeiro
- 1999 – B.J. Surhoff
- 2000 – Delino DeShields
- 2001 – Jeff Conine
- 2002 – Rodrigo Lopez
- 2003 – Jay Gibbons
- 2004 – Miguel Tejada
- 2005 – Brian Roberts
- 2006 – Miguel Tejada
- 2007 – Nick Markakis
- 2008 – Aubrey Huff
- 2009 – Brian Roberts
- 2010 – Luke Scott
- 2011 – Adam Jones
- 2012 – Adam Jones
- 2013 – Chris Davis
- 2014 – Nelson Cruz
- 2015 – Chris Davis
- 2016 – Manny Machado
- 2017 – Jonathan Schoop
- 2018 – Adam Jones
- 2019 - Trey Mancini
- 2020 - Anthony Santander
- 2021 - Cedric Mullins
- 2022 - Adley Rutschman
- 2023 - Gunnar Henderson
- 2024 - Gunnar Henderson
- 2025 - Trevor Rogers

=== Retired numbers ===
See Baltimore Orioles § Retired numbers

=== Ford C. Frick Award recipients ===
See Baltimore Orioles § Ford C. Frick Award recipients

=== Associated Press Athlete of the Year ===
- 1966: Frank Robinson
- 1995: Cal Ripken Jr.

=== Hickok Belt ===
See footnote

- 1966 – Frank Robinson
- 1970 – Brooks Robinson

=== Sports Illustrated Sportsman of the Year ===
See: Sportsman of the Year

== Single-Season leaders ==
=== Hitters ===
Batting Champions

- 1966: Frank Robinson (.316)

Home Run Champions

- 1966: Frank Robinson (49)
- 1981: Eddie Murray t(22)
- 2013: Chris Davis (53)
- 2014: Nelson Cruz (40)
- 2015: Chris Davis (47)
- 2016: Mark Trumbo (47)

RBI Champions

- 1964: Brooks Robinson (118)
- 1966: Frank Robinson (122)
- 1976: Lee May (109)
- 1981: Eddie Murray (78)
- 2004: Miguel Tejada (150)
- 2013: Chris Davis (138)

=== Pitchers ===
Winning Games leaders

- 1960: Chuck Estrada (18)
- 1970: Mike Cuellar – Dave McNally t(24)
- 1975: Jim Palmer t(23)
- 1976: Jim Palmer (22)
- 1977: Jim Palmer t(20)
- 1979: Mike Flanagan (23)
- 1980: Steve Stone (25)
- 1981: Dennis Martínez t(14)
- 1984: Mike Boddicker (20)
- 1995: Mike Mussina (19)

Strikeouts leaders

- 1954: Bob Turley (185)

ERA leaders

- 1959: Hoyt Wilhelm (2.19)
- 1973: Jim Palmer (2.40)
- 1975: Jim Palmer (2.09)
- 1984: Mike Boddicker (2.79)

=== Baserunning ===
Stolen Base Champions

- 1963: Luis Aparicio (40)
- 1964: Luis Aparicio (57)
- 2007: Brian Roberts (50)
- 2022: Jorge Mateo (35)

== See also ==
- Baseball awards
- List of MLB awards
