= 50 home run club =

Group of batters who have hit 50 or more home runs in a single season

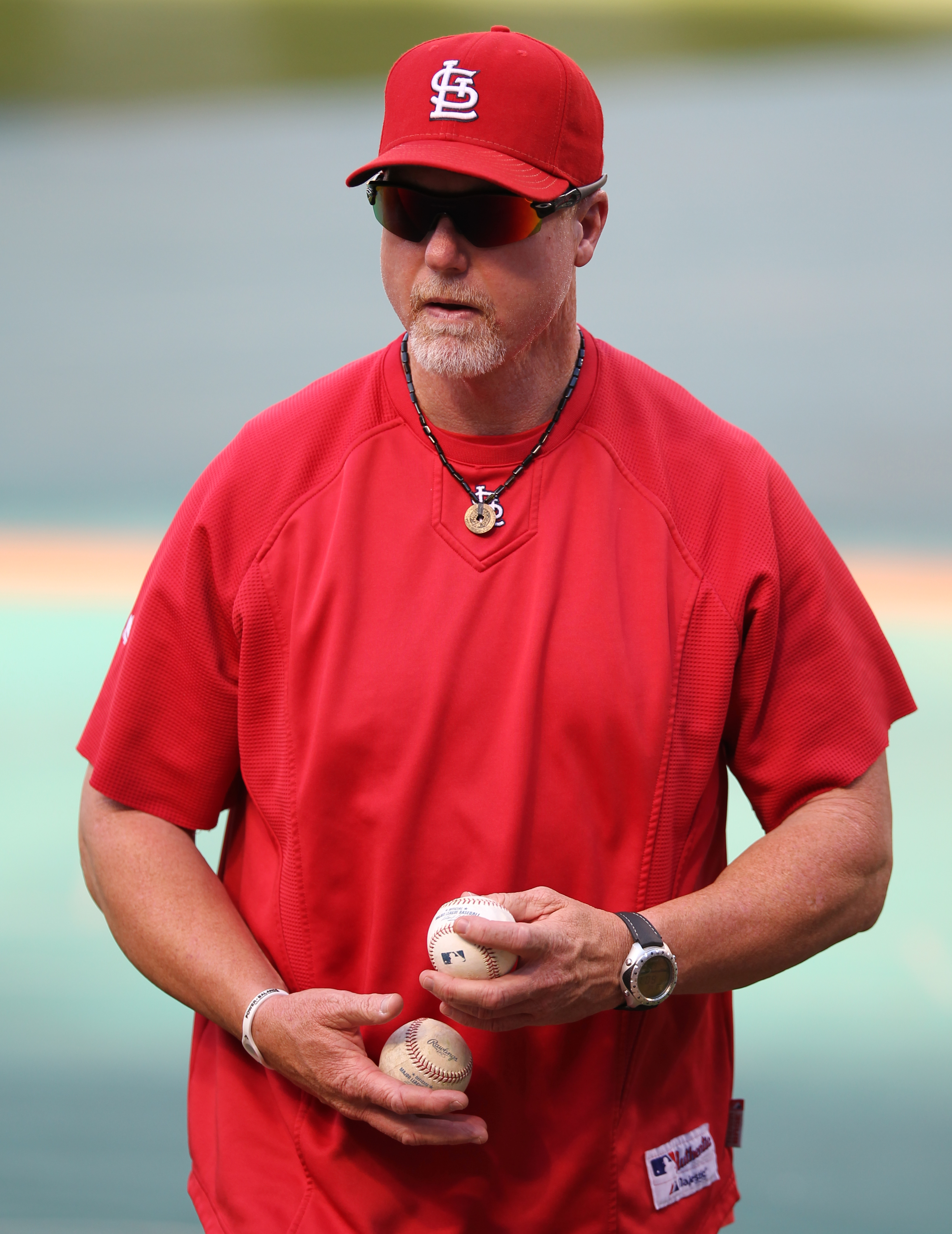
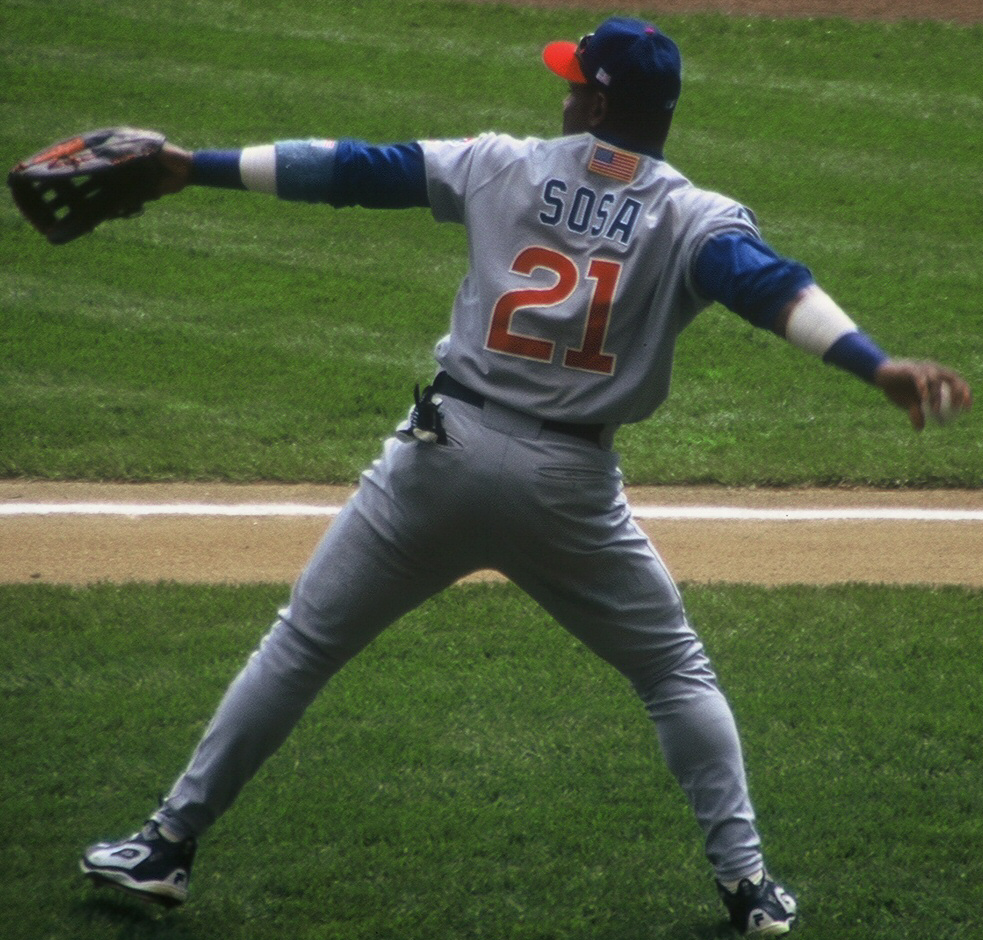
Mark McGwire (left) and Sammy Sosa (right) are two of the four total players to have hit 50 home runs in four seasons.

In Major League Baseball (MLB), the 50 home run club is the group of batters who have hit 50 or more home runs in a single season. Babe Ruth was the first to achieve this, doing so in 1920. By reaching the milestone, he also became the first player to hit 30 and then 40 home runs in a single season, breaking his own record of 29 from the 1919 season. Ruth subsequently became the first player to reach the 50 home run club on four occasions, repeating the achievement in 1921, 1927, and 1928. He remained the only player to accomplish this until Mark McGwire and Sammy Sosa matched his feat in 1999 and 2001, respectively. In doing so, they became the only players to have achieved 50 home runs in four consecutive seasons. Only 7 players, Babe Ruth, Ken Griffey Jr, Mark McGwire, Sammy Sosa, Alex Rodriguez, Aaron Judge, and Shohei Ohtani, have hit 50 home runs in consecutive seasons. Barry Bonds hit the most home runs to join the club, collecting 73 in 2001. Most recently, for the first time in over two decades, four players hit 50 home runs in the 2025 season: Shohei Ohtani, Cal Raleigh, Kyle Schwarber, and Aaron Judge (his fourth season of the milestone).

In total, 34 players have reached the 50 home run club in MLB history and eleven have done so more than once. Of these, seventeen were right-handed batters, fifteen were left-handed, and two were switch hitters, meaning they could bat from either side of the plate. Four of these players (including two active members of the 50 home run club) have played for only one major league team. Of the thirty MLB teams, twenty-two have seen one of their players reach the milestone, with the Chicago White Sox, Colorado Rockies, Houston Astros, Kansas City Royals, Los Angeles Angels, Minnesota Twins, Tampa Bay Rays, and Washington Nationals being the teams to never have a player reach the mark. The New York Yankees are the only franchise to have five players reach the milestone while on their roster: Ruth, Mickey Mantle, Roger Maris, Alex Rodriguez, and Aaron Judge. Ten players are also members of the 500 home run club and two of them (Willie Mays and Rodriguez) are also members of the 3,000 hit club. Ten players won the Most Valuable Player (MVP) Award in the same year as their 50 home run season. Mantle is the only player to have earned the Major League Triple Crown alongside achieving 50 home runs, leading both leagues in batting average, home runs and runs batted in (RBI). Mantle and Maris—collectively known as the M&M Boys—are the only teammates to reach the 50 home run club in the same season, hitting a combined 115 home runs in 1961 and breaking the single-season record for home runs by a pair of teammates. Albert Belle is the only player to amass 50 or more doubles in addition to attaining 50 home runs. Prince Fielder, at 23 years and 139 days, was the youngest player to reach the milestone while Bonds, at age 37, was the oldest. Pete Alonso and Aaron Judge are the only players to hit 50 home runs in their rookie seasons.

Due to the infrequent addition of members into the 50 home run club, Baseball Digest called it "a restrictive fraternity comprising slugging elite" in 1954, when there were only six members. Of the 25 members eligible for the Baseball Hall of Fame, eleven have been elected and six were elected on the first ballot. Eligibility requires that a player has "been retired five seasons" or deceased for at least six months, disqualifying seven active players and two players who have been retired for less than five seasons. Some believe the milestone has become less important with the large number of new members; fifteen players joined the club on a total of 24 occasions from 1995 to 2010. Additionally, several of the members who entered the club during that time have had ties to performance-enhancing drugs.

== Members ==
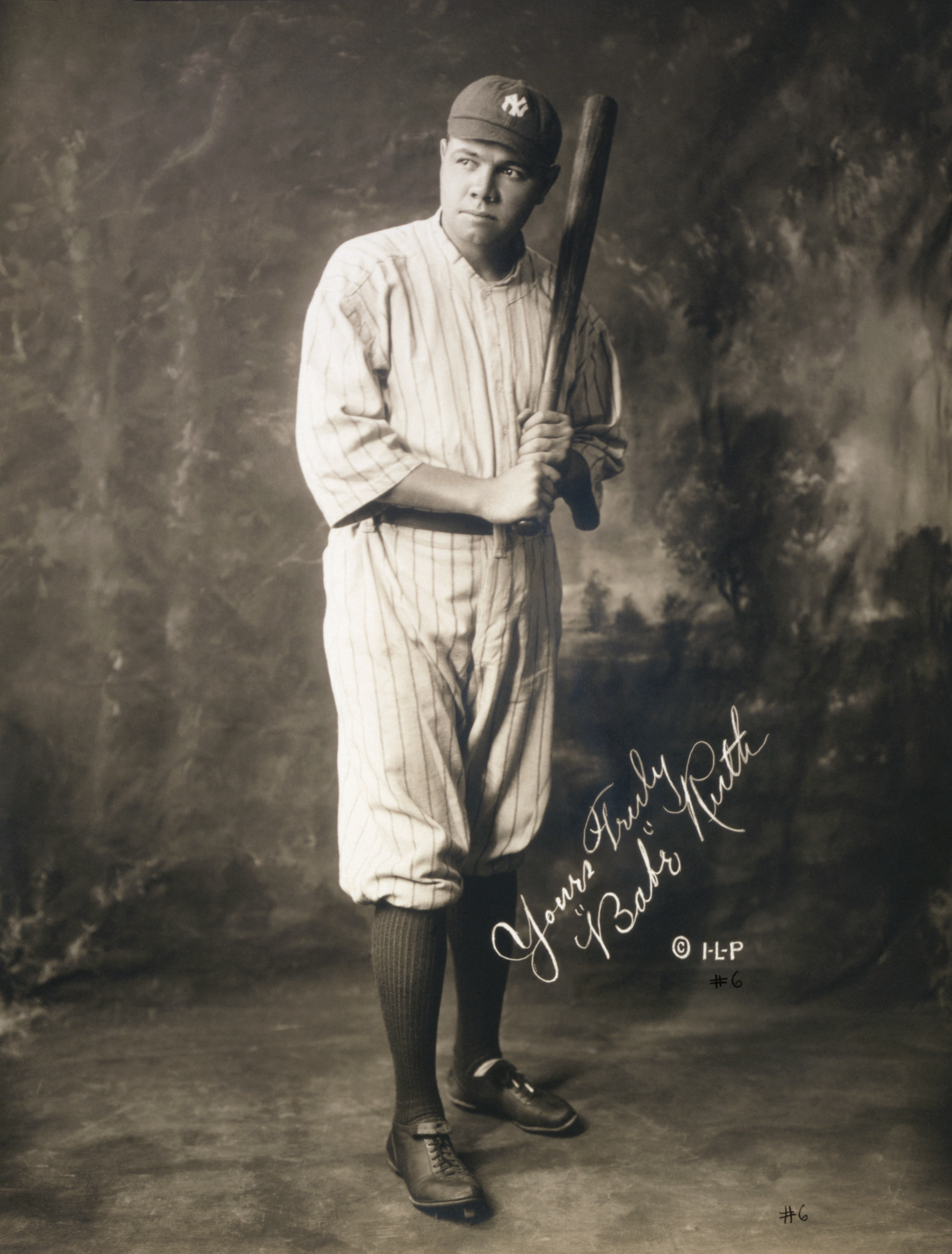
Babe Ruth was the first member of the 50 home run club and joined it in four seasons, a record he shares with Mark McGwire, Sammy Sosa, and Aaron Judge.

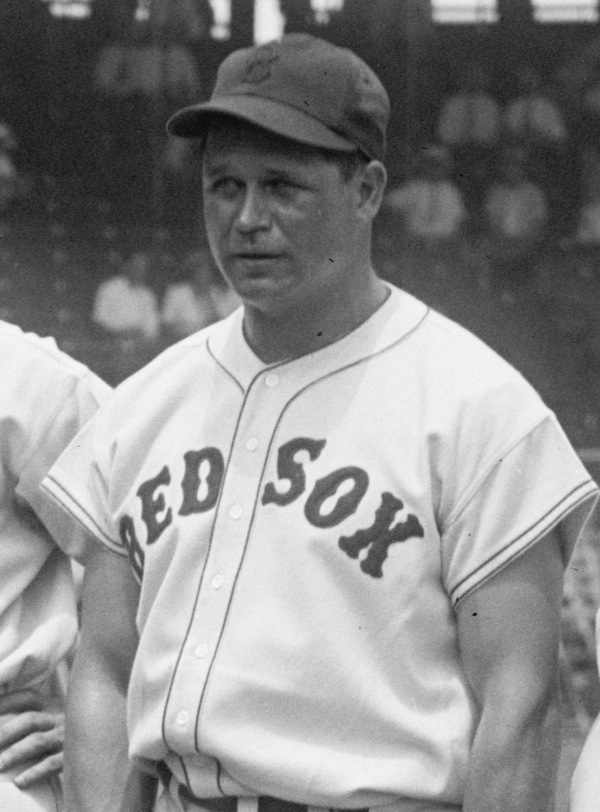
Jimmie Foxx achieved the 50 home run club and won the MVP Award in 1932, 1933 and 1938.

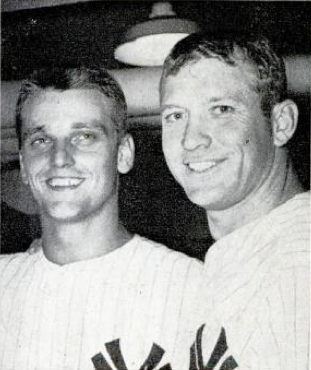
Mickey Mantle (right) earned the Triple Crown in addition to achieving the 50 home run club in 1956. Five years later, he and Roger Maris (left) became the only teammates to reach the 50 home run club in the same season.

Key
Year	The year the player's 50 home run season occurred
Player (n)	Name of the player and number of 50 home run seasons they had accomplished at that point
Team	The player's team for his 50 home run season
HR	Number of home runs in that season
Career	The number of home runs the player hit in his MLB career
^	Denotes single-season home run record progression
†	Elected to the Baseball Hall of Fame
‡	Player is active
*	Ongoing season

Members of the 50 home run club
Year	Player	Team	HR	Career	Ref
1920	Babe Ruth^{†}	New York Yankees	54^{^}	714	
1921	Babe Ruth^{†} (2)	New York Yankees	59^{^}	714	
1927	Babe Ruth^{†} (3)	New York Yankees	60^{^}	714	
1928	Babe Ruth^{†} (4)	New York Yankees	54	714	
1930	Hack Wilson^{†}	Chicago Cubs	56	244	
1932	Jimmie Foxx^{†}	Philadelphia Athletics	58	534	
1938	Jimmie Foxx^{†} (2)	Boston Red Sox	50	534	
1938	Hank Greenberg^{†}	Detroit Tigers	58	331	
1947	Johnny Mize^{†}	New York Giants	51	359	
1947	Ralph Kiner^{†}	Pittsburgh Pirates	51	369	
1949	Ralph Kiner^{†} (2)	Pittsburgh Pirates	54	369	
1955	Willie Mays^{†}	New York Giants	51	660	
1956	Mickey Mantle^{†}	New York Yankees	52	536	
1961	Mickey Mantle^{†} (2)	New York Yankees	54	536	
1961	Roger Maris	New York Yankees	61^{^}	275	
1965	Willie Mays^{†} (2)	San Francisco Giants	52	660	
1977	George Foster	Cincinnati Reds	52	348	
1990	Cecil Fielder	Detroit Tigers	51	319	
1995	Albert Belle	Cleveland Indians	50	381	
1996	Brady Anderson	Baltimore Orioles	50	210	
1996	Mark McGwire	Oakland Athletics	52	583	
1997	Ken Griffey Jr.^{†}	Seattle Mariners	56	630	
1997	Mark McGwire (2)	Oakland Athletics; St. Louis Cardinals	58	583	
1998	Greg Vaughn	San Diego Padres	50	355	
1998	Ken Griffey Jr.^{†} (2)	Seattle Mariners	56	630	
1998	Sammy Sosa	Chicago Cubs	66	609	
1998	Mark McGwire (3)	St. Louis Cardinals	70^{^}	583	
1999	Sammy Sosa (2)	Chicago Cubs	63	609	
1999	Mark McGwire (4)	St. Louis Cardinals	65	583	
2000	Sammy Sosa (3)	Chicago Cubs	50	609	
2001	Alex Rodriguez	Texas Rangers	52	696	
2001	Luis Gonzalez	Arizona Diamondbacks	57	354	
2001	Sammy Sosa (4)	Chicago Cubs	64	609	
2001	Barry Bonds	San Francisco Giants	73^{^}	762	
2002	Jim Thome^{†}	Cleveland Indians	52	612	
2002	Alex Rodriguez (2)	Texas Rangers	57	696	
2005	Andruw Jones^{†}	Atlanta Braves	51	434	
2006	Ryan Howard	Philadelphia Phillies	58	382	
2006	David Ortiz^{†}	Boston Red Sox	54	541	
2007	Alex Rodriguez (3)	New York Yankees	54	696	
2007	Prince Fielder	Milwaukee Brewers	50	319	
2010	José Bautista	Toronto Blue Jays	54	344	
2013	Chris Davis	Baltimore Orioles	53	295	,
2017	Giancarlo Stanton^{‡}	Miami Marlins	59	453	
2017	Aaron Judge^{‡}	New York Yankees	52	368	
2019	Pete Alonso^{‡}	New York Mets	53	264	
2022	Aaron Judge^{‡} (2)	New York Yankees	62	368	
2023	Matt Olson^{‡}	Atlanta Braves	54	288	
2024	Aaron Judge^{‡} (3)	New York Yankees	58	368	
2024	Shohei Ohtani^{‡}	Los Angeles Dodgers	54	280	
2025	Cal Raleigh^{‡}	Seattle Mariners	60	153	
2025	Kyle Schwarber^{‡}	Philadelphia Phillies	56	340	
2025	Shohei Ohtani^{‡} (2)	Los Angeles Dodgers	55	280	
2025	Aaron Judge^{‡} (4)	New York Yankees	53	368	

== See also ==
- List of Major League Baseball annual home run leaders
- Major League Baseball single-season home run record
- List of Major League Baseball home run records
