= Trevor Rogers (baseball) =

American baseball player (born 1997)

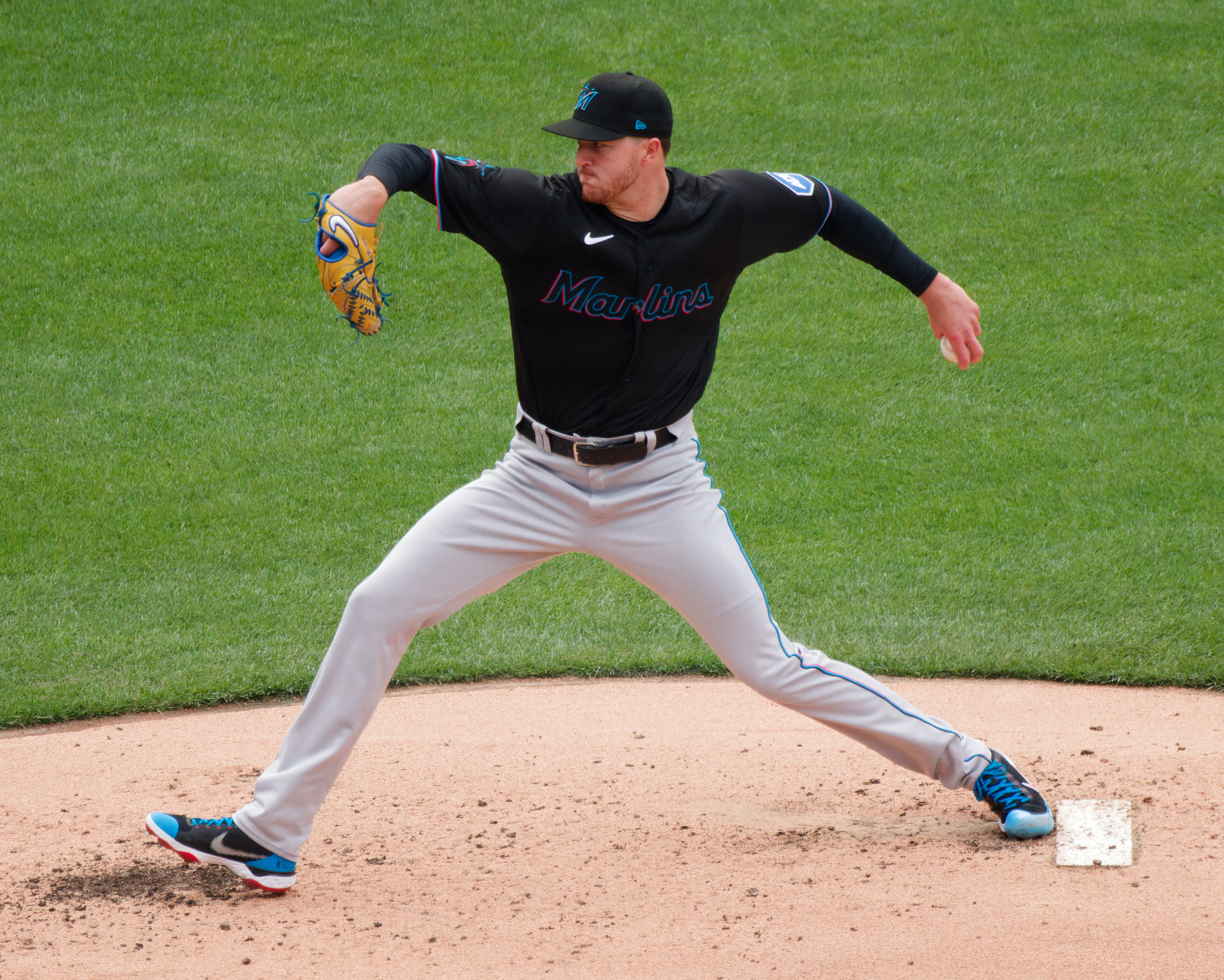
- Rogers with the Marlins in 2023

Free agent
- Pitcher
- Born: November 13, 1997 (age 28); Carlsbad, New Mexico, U.S.
- Bats: Left Throws: Left

MLB debut
- August 25, 2020, for the Miami Marlins

MLB statistics (through 2026 season)
- Win–loss record: 34–48
- Earned run average: 3.88
- Strikeouts: 678
- Stats at Baseball Reference

Teams
- Miami Marlins (2020–2024); Baltimore Orioles (2024–2026)

Career highlights and awards
- All-Star (2021)

Trevor J-Daniel Rogers (born November 13, 1997) is an American professional baseball pitcher who is a free agent. He has previously played in Major League Baseball (MLB) for the Miami Marlins and Baltimore Orioles. Rogers was selected 13th overall by the Marlins in the 2017 MLB draft, and made his MLB debut with them in 2020.

== Amateur career ==
Rogers attended Carlsbad High School in Carlsbad, New Mexico. As a junior, he was 9–2 with a 0.70 earned run average (ERA) and 122 strikeouts and helped lead his team to victory in the 6A state championship game.

Rogers committed to Texas Tech University to play college baseball. Considered one of the top prospects for the 2017 Major League Baseball draft, the Miami Marlins selected him with the 13th overall selection. Rogers signed with Miami for $3.4 million.

== Professional career ==
=== Miami Marlins ===
==== Minor leagues ====
Rogers made his professional debut in 2018 with the Greensboro Grasshoppers and spent the entire season there, pitching to a 2–7 record with a 5.82 ERA over 17 starts. He began 2019 with the Jupiter Hammerheads with whom he was named a Florida State League All-Star. He was promoted to the Jacksonville Jumbo Shrimp in August. Over 23 starts between both clubs, Rogers went 6–10 with a 2.90 ERA, striking out 150 batters over 136 1/3 innings.

==== Major leagues ====
On August 25, 2020, Rogers was selected to the active roster. He started against the New York Mets, pitching four scoreless innings and allowing one hit. He made seven starts in 2020, going 1–2 with a 6.11 ERA with 39 strikeouts over 28 innings.

Rogers began 2021 as a member of Miami's starting rotation. He was named the NL Rookie of the Month Award back-to-back for the months of April and May 2021. He opened the season with a 3-1 record and a 1.29 ERA in five starts with thirty-eight strikeouts over twenty-eight innings in April. He followed that strong performance again in May with a 3-2 record and a 2.34 ERA in six starts, striking out thirty-eight batters. He was the first Marlins player to win Rookie of the Month honors since Justin Bour in September 2015 and the first Marlins pitcher to win it since José Fernández in July 2013. In July of that year, Rogers was named to the All-Star Game as the Marlins' sole representative. He finished the 2021 record with a 2.64 ERA and 157 strikeouts over 133 innings in 25 starts, despite a 7–8 record. He finished second in NL Rookie of the Year voting behind Jonathan India.

In 2022, Rogers had a down year in retrospect to his rookie campaign. In 23 starts, he registered a 4–11 record and 5.47 ERA with 106 strikeouts in 107.0 innings pitched. His sophomore season ended prematurely after he was placed on the injured list with a left lat strain on September 22.

Rogers began the 2023 season out of the rotation with Miami, logging a 1–2 record in 4 starts. In an April 19 start against the San Francisco Giants, Rogers was removed from the outing with an injury, later revealed to be a left biceps strain. He began a rehab assignment with the Single–A Jupiter Hammerheads on May 30. However, after Rogers was scratched from a scheduled start on June 10, he was transferred to the 60-day injured list three days later, where he spent the remainder of the year.

Rogers made 21 starts for the Marlins in 2024, compiling a 2–9 record and 4.53 ERA with 85 strikeouts across 105 1/3 innings pitched.

=== Baltimore Orioles ===
On July 30, 2024, the Marlins traded Rogers to the Baltimore Orioles in exchange for infielder Connor Norby and outfielder Kyle Stowers. He allowed 15 earned runs in 19 innings with a 0–2 record and a 7.11 ERA in four starts before being optioned to the Norfolk Tides on August 22.

Rogers' 2025 campaign was delayed due to a partial right kneecap dislocation which he sustained during the offseason in January. The Orioles announced that Rogers would be returning to the club's starting rotation on May 23. He retired 19 of 22 batters in 6 1/3 scoreless innings in a 2–1 away win over the Boston Red Sox in the second game of a split doubleheader the following night on May 24. On August 18, 2025, in a 6-3 win against the Red Sox, Rogers dropped his season ERA to 1.41, becoming the first Orioles starter to have an ERA under 1.50 through his first 12 starts of a season, besting the prior record of 1.50 set by Hoyt Wilhelm in 1954. He was named the winner of the 2025 Louis M. Hatter Most Valuable Oriole Award on September 23. He finished 2025 at 9–3 with a 0.90 WHIP. His 1.81 ERA established a new Orioles record for pitchers who worked at least 100 innings in a season, surpassing Stu Miller's 1.89 in 1965.

Rogers was announced as Baltimore's Opening Day starting pitcher for the 2026 season.

== Personal life ==
His cousin, Cody Ross, played for nine different teams spanning 13 seasons in the major leagues, including a stint with the San Francisco Giants where he won a World Series ring.

Awards
Preceded by Nathan Eovaldi	American League Pitcher of the Month; August 2025	Most recent
