= Christina Davis =

Christina Davis or Davies may refer to:

- Christina Davis (Big Brother Australia), contestant on Big Brother Australia
- Christina Davis (poet), American poet
- Christina Davies, character played by Lauren Storm

== See also ==
- Christine Davis (disambiguation)
- Chris Davis (disambiguation)
- Kristina Davis, a fictional character from the soap opera, General Hospital
