= Brady Anderson =

American baseball player (born 1964)

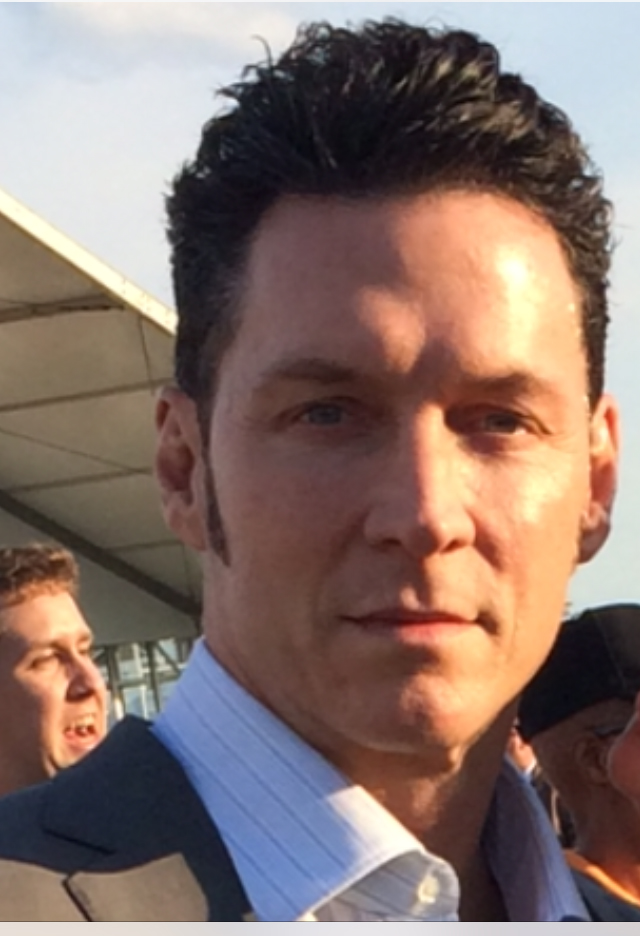
- Anderson in 2014

Los Angeles Angels – No. 99
- Outfielder
- Born: January 18, 1964 (age 62); Silver Spring, Maryland, U.S.
- Batted: Left Threw: Left

MLB debut
- April 4, 1988, for the Boston Red Sox

Last MLB appearance
- May 20, 2002, for the Cleveland Indians

MLB statistics
- Batting average: .256
- Home runs: 210
- Runs batted in: 761
- Stats at Baseball Reference

Teams
- As player: Boston Red Sox (1988); Baltimore Orioles (1988–2001); Cleveland Indians (2002); As coach: Los Angeles Angels (2026–present)

Career highlights and awards
- 3× All-Star (1992, 1996, 1997); Baltimore Orioles Hall of Fame

Brady Kevin Anderson (born January 18, 1964) is an American former baseball outfielder and executive who currently serves as the hitting coach for the Los Angeles Angels of Major League Baseball (MLB). He played for the Boston Red Sox, Baltimore Orioles, and Cleveland Indians. He spent the majority of his career as a center fielder and leadoff hitter for the Orioles in the 1990s, where he was a three-time All Star, and, in 1996, became the 15th player in major league history to hit 50 home runs in one season. Anderson bats and throws left-handed, stands 6 feet 1 inch (1.85 m) tall, and weighs 199 pounds (90 kg).

A native of Silver Spring, Maryland, Anderson was selected by the Red Sox in the tenth round of the 1985 amateur draft. His 50 home runs in 1996 set an Orioles team record until surpassed by Chris Davis in 2013. With 53 stolen bases in 1992, Anderson became the first player in major league history to have achieved separate season totals of both 50 home runs and 50 stolen bases. He was inducted into the Baltimore Orioles Hall of Fame in 2004.

== Early life and education ==
Anderson was born in Silver Spring, Maryland, on January 18, 1964, and attended Carlsbad High School in Carlsbad, California. He went on to study economics at the University of California, Irvine where he played outfield and first base for the Anteaters. He left college following his junior season after being drafted in the 10th round of the 1985 Major League Baseball draft by the Boston Red Sox.

== Playing career ==
=== 1988–1991 ===
Anderson made his major league debut on April 4, 1988. Batting .230 with 12 runs batted in (RBI) and 4 stolen bases, he was optioned on June 4, 1988, to the Pawtucket Red Sox where he hit .287 in 49 games. He was traded along with Curt Schilling to Baltimore for Mike Boddicker on July 29, 1988, two days prior to the non-waivers trade deadline. He was the key player acquired by the Orioles who needed a center fielder and leadoff batter. Anderson hit his first major league home run on August 6, 1988, versus Milwaukee's Tom Filer at Memorial Stadium in Baltimore.

=== 1992 ===
In only his first season as a full-time player in 1992, Anderson played in all but three of the Orioles games and led the major leagues with 749 plate appearances. He earned his first of three All-Star nominations and played in the 1992 All-Star Game at San Diego on July 14. By season's end, he had become the first player in American League history to reach 20 homers, 50 steals and 75 RBI in a season. Anderson finished 15th in AL MVP voting.

=== 1993 ===
Despite missing 15 games with chicken pox and patellar tendinitis in both knees, Anderson led all American League leadoff hitters in extra-base hits (56) and RBI (62). He also led the Orioles in eight offensive categories, including runs scored (87), stolen bases (24), walks (82), triples (8), and extra base hits (57). He batted .571 (8–14) with the bases loaded, the fourth highest total in the American League.

=== 1994 ===
The 1994 season was cut short two months by the player's strike. Anderson led all American League left fielders with a 1.000 fielding percentage, and his 31 stolen bases in 32 attempts was a major league record for 25 or more steals.

=== 1995 ===
On June 12, Anderson set an American League record with 34 consecutive stolen bases. The streak ended on July 3 at 36 when he was caught by Minnesota Twins catcher Matt Walbeck. His record was eclipsed by Chicago's Tim Raines later in the year and was matched by Toronto's Paul Molitor. Anderson was the hardest to double up in the American League, grounding into only three double plays on the year: once every 184.7 at-bats. He hit two home runs on September 5, the night teammate Cal Ripken Jr. tied Lou Gehrig's consecutive games played record of 2,130. On September 6, Anderson spoke on behalf of his teammates at a post-game ceremony honoring Ripken's 2,131st consecutive game.

=== 1996 ===
Anderson went into the final game of the 1996 season (visiting the Toronto Blue Jays) with 49 home runs. In his first at-bat, he hit his 50th homer off Cy Young Award winner Pat Hentgen, breaking Frank Robinson's record for most home runs in a season by a Baltimore Oriole. He also became the first player in major league history to be in the 50–20 club and the 20–50 clubs.

Anderson set the record for leadoff home runs in a season with 12 (this record has been surpassed since). He also shattered a major league record by leading off four consecutive games with a home run. The previous mark was two straight games, done 33 times. In the annual Baseball America "Tools of the Trade" poll, Anderson was named as the league's third-best defensive outfielder, behind only Seattle's Ken Griffey Jr. and Cleveland's Kenny Lofton. Anderson also hit 37 doubles and five triples and led the American League in extra base hits with 92, breaking the Orioles club record previously held by Cal Ripken Jr.

Anderson had more than doubled his previous best of 21 home runs in 1992, and his uncharacteristic power surge has since led to allegations that he used performance-enhancing drugs during the 1996 season.

=== 1997 ===
Despite playing most of the 1997 season with a broken rib, Anderson led the Orioles to a wire-to-wire American League East title with a record of 98–64. Anderson made his third All-Star appearance at the 1997 All-Star Game in Cleveland, where he played the entire game in the leadoff spot for the American League and went 2-for-4 with a double high off the 19-foot left field wall against pitcher Curt Schilling.

Anderson led the Orioles in 13 offensive categories: batting average (.288), on-base percentage (.393), OPS (.862), plate appearances (696), runs scored (97), hits (170), doubles (39), triples (7), walks (84), stolen bases (18), and extra base hits (tied with Rafael Palmeiro – 64). He was hit by pitches a league-leading 19 times, marking the second straight year he led the league.

== 1998 ==
Anderson appeared on the cover of the Konami video game Bottom of the 9th '99. The game was released on August 31, 1998, for the PlayStation.

=== 1999 ===
In 1999, Anderson rebounded from an injury-plagued 1998 campaign for one of the best all-around seasons of his career. He led American League leadoff hitters with a .408 on-base percentage and reached base 279 times, ninth most in the league. For the season, Anderson batted .282 with 28 doubles, five triples, 24 home runs, 109 runs scored, 81 runs batted in, 36 stolen bases, 96 walks, and 24 hit by pitch. He became the only leadoff hitter in history with three 75 RBI seasons to his credit. On May 23, Anderson became the first player in American League history to be hit by a pitch twice in the same inning. He broke his own American League record for hit by pitch in a season by a left-handed batter, set in 1996. The previous record was held by Washington's Henry Homer Doc Gessler, who was hit 20 times in 1911. In a post-season statistical analysis by Baseball America, Anderson was rated as the best leadoff hitter in the American League.

=== 2000–2003 ===
With one year remaining on a five-year contract, Anderson was released by the Orioles on November 16, 2001, after a season in which he batted .202 with eight home runs and 45 RBI in 131 games. He currently holds the Orioles career stolen base record with 311. He signed a one-year contract with club options for 2003 and 2004 with the Indians three weeks later on December 6. The transaction cost the Indians the $200,000 minimum, while the Orioles had to pay $4,000,000. He hit 13-for-80 for a .163 average with one homer and five RBI in 34 games before he was released by the Indians on May 21, 2002. He signed a minor-league contract with the San Diego Padres on December 9, 2002. He accepted an assignment to the Portland Beavers on March 27, 2003, after his attempt to make the Padres' Opening Day roster was not successful. He was released by the Beavers 38 days later on May 4.

=== Postseason ===
In four post-season series, (Cleveland Indians and New York Yankees in 1996, Cleveland Indians and Seattle Mariners in 1997) Anderson had 80 at bats, 16 runs scored, four doubles, six home runs, a .300 batting average, a .380 on-base percentage, and a .575 slugging percentage.

In the 1997 playoffs, Anderson hit .353 against Seattle with a .588 slugging average and a .360 batting average against Cleveland with a .680 slugging average.

=== Legacy ===
Anderson still ranks among the top ten in Orioles/St. Louis Browns career statistics in:

- Games (1759 - 6th place)
- At-bats (6,271 - 6th)
- Plate Appearances (7,464 - 4th)
- Runs (1,044 - 5th)
- Total Bases (2,698 - 7th)
- Hits (1,614 - 6th)
- Doubles (329 - 6th)
- Triples (64 - 10th)
- Home Runs (209 - 8th)
- RBI (744 - 10th)
- Extra Base Hits (602 - 4th)
- Stolen Bases (307 - 2nd)
- Walks (927 - 3rd)
- Times Hit By Pitch (148 - 1st)
- Stolen Base % (75.8% - 5th)
- Power-Speed # (248.7 - 1st)
- Times on Base (2,689 - 5th)
- Intentional Walks (71 - 7th)
- Runs Created (1,094 - 5th)

He also holds the franchise's single-season record for total bases (369 in 1996) and times hit by pitch (24 in 1999).

=== 1996 season ===
For 17 seasons, Anderson's 1996 output of 50 home runs and 92 extra base hits were also single-season records for the Orioles/Browns franchise. Chris Davis surpassed Anderson's career year in both categories in 2013.

As of 2025, Anderson is one of only three players (the others being Barry Bonds and Shohei Ohtani) to have stolen 50 or more bases in a season (53 in 1992) and hit 50 or more home runs in a season (50 in 1996). For posterity, Bonds stole 52 bases in 1990 and hit 73 home runs in 2001. In the 2024 season Shohei Ohtani was the most recent player to accomplish this being the only to achieve both within a single season (54HR / 59SB).

Anderson was not able to duplicate his 50 home run season; in fact, his next best power season came in 1999, when he hit 24 homers. However, for a nine-year stretch from 1992–2000, Anderson annually averaged 21 home runs, 6 triples, 31 doubles, 96 runs scored, 70 RBI, 27 stolen bases, a .376 on base average, a .462 slugging average, and 14 times hit by a pitch. Anderson attained these figures despite one season shortened two months by a player strike (1994) and another shortened one month by owner lockout (1995).

=== Player profile ===
A left-handed hitter and thrower, Anderson's combination of power and speed made him a unique leadoff hitter: Anderson reached three All-Star Games and earned AL Most Valuable Player votes in two different seasons. The power-speed combination was so rare, he remains the only player to steal 50 bases and hit 20 home runs in one season (1992), then record at least 50 home runs and 20 steals in another (1996).

Anderson's breakout year in 1992 and subsequent success marked a dramatic reversal of his first four years in Major League Baseball, where he'd failed to hit better than .231 in any season, becoming the first outfielder to do so according to Elias Sports Bureau.

Much of the career turnaround owed to Anderson's commitment to cross training and fitness exercises. And reversing seemingly negative trends eventually became Anderson's trademark: after ranking in the top 10 in times caught stealing the previous two seasons, Anderson stole 31 bases in 32 attempts in the strike-shortened 1994 season. The 96.9% stolen base percentage remains the highest percentage for players who recorded at least 25 stolen bases in a season.

== Honors ==
On August 21, 2004, Anderson was inducted into the Baltimore Orioles Hall of Fame. Cal Ripken Jr. introduced Anderson and called him "the greatest lead-off hitter in Orioles baseball, and the best athlete I have ever played with." During Ripken's induction ceremony to the Baseball Hall of Fame in 2007, he described Anderson as "simply my best friend".

== Post-playing career ==
=== Front office ===
Anderson was named Special Assistant to the Executive Vice-president for Baseball Operations by the Orioles on January 19, 2012. He was promoted to vice-president of Baseball Operations one year later on February 19, 2013. He left the organization at the conclusion of the 2019 season as a result of his role being significantly reduced after Mike Elias replaced Dan Duquette in charge of the team's baseball operations.

=== Acting and personal life ===
Anderson appeared on an episode of the television sitcom Sabrina the Teenage Witch. It was the Season 1, Episode 14 titled, "Sabrina Through the Looking Glass," which originally aired on January 17, 1997.

Anderson appeared in the 2011 movie The Absent, and was credited as "baseball player."

In 2020, Anderson began dating South Korean-American singer, actress and ballerina Stephanie, whom he met in Los Angeles in 2012.

=== Work in Japan ===
Brady Anderson joined Ripken on a journey to Japan, the first trip for Anderson as a "sports diplomat". Anderson was an obvious choice for a companion for Ripken who said that Anderson is someone who "could help on the mission, spread goodwill and be with kids". Anderson and Ripken were joined by Japanese baseball player Sachio Kinugasa. The trip took place November 8–16, 2011, and included visits to several towns (Tokyo, Ofunato, Nishinomiya, and Kyoto) affected by the 2011 Tōhoku earthquake and tsunami. During the trip to Japan, Anderson and Ripken hosted baseball and softball clinics, as well as motivational activities.

=== Coaching ===
On November 21, 2025, the Los Angeles Angels hired Anderson to serve as the team's hitting coach under new manager Kurt Suzuki.

== See also ==
- 50 home run club
- List of Baltimore Orioles owners and executives
- List of Baltimore Orioles team records
- List of Major League Baseball career hit by pitch leaders
- List of Major League Baseball career runs scored leaders
