= Lynching of Christopher Davis =

1881 lynching in Ohio, U.S.

Christopher C. Davis was a Black man who lived near Albany, Ohio with his wife and two children. He worked as a farm laborer. In 1881, he was accused of raping a white woman, after which he was arrested. While in jail in Athens, Ohio, before his trial, a mob of White men broke into the jail and lynched him by hanging him from a bridge over the Hocking River. None of the White men were indicted of a crime.

== Accusation and lynching ==
On October 30, 1881, a white woman who lived near Davis, Lucinda Luckey, reported that she had been raped and assaulted. Her family members accused Davis, who had known Luckey for some time, worked as a farmhand for her, and allowed her to stay in his house after she experienced a house fire. He was arrested and sent to a jail in Chillicothe, Ohio over fears that he would be lynched, though he was sent back to Athens, Ohio on November 20 for his trial. The next day, November 21, a mob of White men traveled from Albany to Athens to break into the jail, overpower the sheriff, and take Davis to a bridge over the Hocking River. Davis told the mob he was innocent of the crime, then was told that he would be returned to the jail if he admitted guilt. He was said to have replied, "I'm the man", after which they hanged him. None of the men who killed him were charged, and members of the mob included community leaders. An 1883 publication that recounted the lynching said, "No one has ever been brought to justice for complicity in it. In fact, public sympathy was so strong that little effort was made to investigate the facts."

== Legacy ==
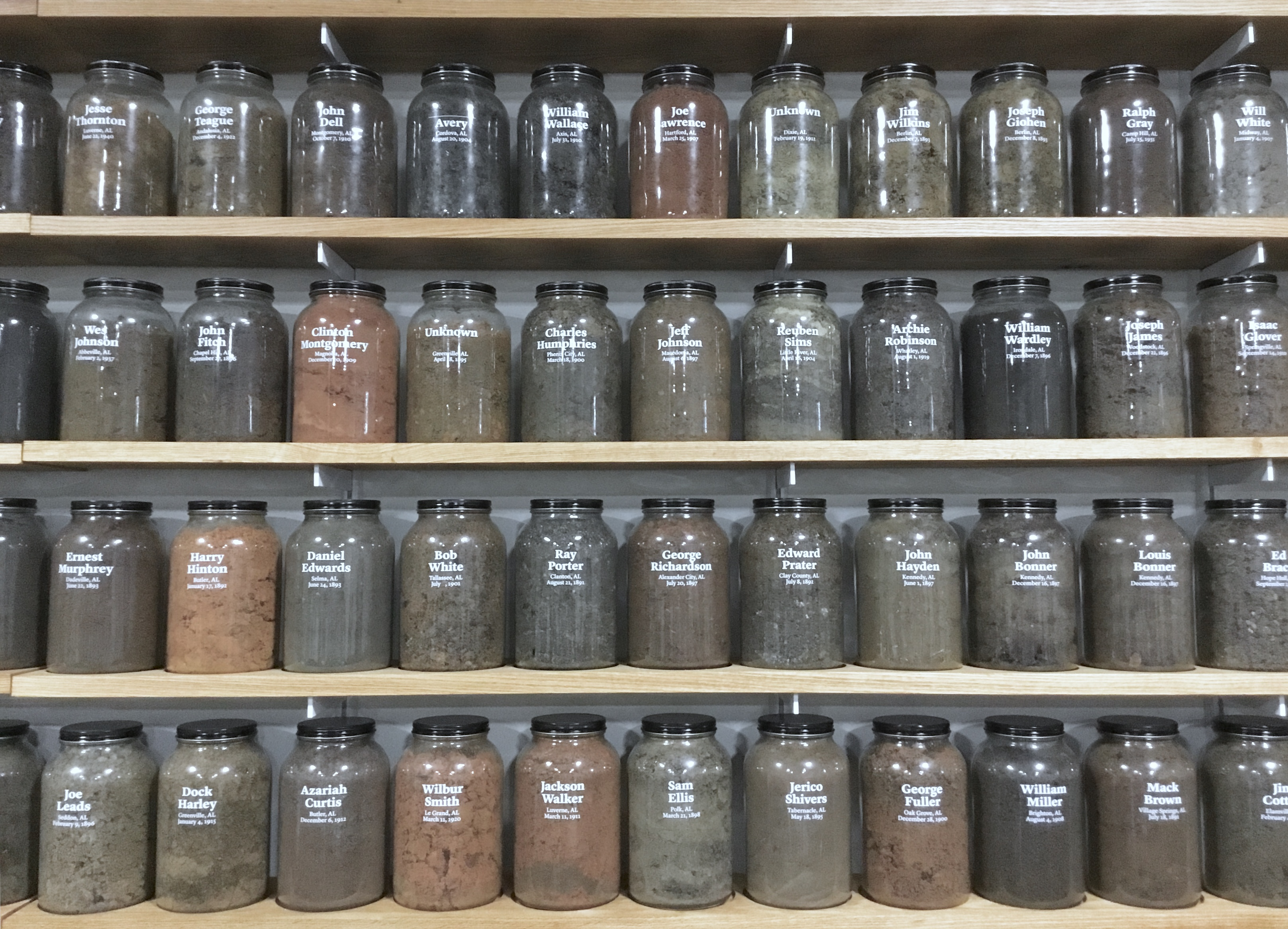
Part of the soil collection at the Legacy Museum (Davis's jar not pictured)

In 2019, members of several local organizations created the Christopher Davis Community Remembrance Project in partnership with the Equal Justice Initiative. In fall of 2019, they held a remembrance event for Davis by the bridge where he was killed, collecting soil from the base of the bridge with an attendance of over 300 people. The soil was sent to The Legacy Museum. In 2020, a historical marker was added to Mulberry Street in Athens, near the site of the bridge, to memorialize Davis.

The events of the lynching were the basis of a play called Southbridge by Reginald Edmund.
