= Christopher Lawrence Davis =

American politician (1875–1951)

Christopher Lawrence Davis (January 7, 1875 – December 19, 1951) was an American farmer, businessman, and politician.

Davis was born on a farm in Meriden Township, Steele County, Minnesota. He graduated from the Owatonna Senior High School, in Owatonna, Minnesota, in 1894. Davis moved to Verndale, Wadena County, Minnesota with his wife and family in 1912. Davis was a farmer and was involved with the farmers exchange and the Verndale Creamery Association. He served as the Steele County Superintendent of Schools from 1904 to 1910. He then served as the mayor of Verndale, Minnesota, as the Assessor of Verndale, Minnesota, and on the Verndale Village Council. Davis also served on the Verndale School Board. He served in the Minnesota House of Representatives from 1929 to 1934.
