= Christine Davis =

Canadian artist from Vancouver

- Born: January 24, 1962 (age 64); Vancouver
- Education: York University (Toronto); College International de Philosophie (Paris)
- Known for: Contemporary artist Video artist Photographer; Installation artist

Christine Davis (born January 24, 1962) is a Canadian artist from Vancouver. She currently lives and works in New York. She grew up in Prince George, Ann Arbor, Lusaka and Toronto. After graduating from York University (Toronto), she attended the Collège International de Philosophie in Paris. She has served on the board of directors of The Power Plant (Toronto) and YYZ Artists' Outlet (Toronto). As a founding editor of the interdisciplinary journal Public: Art/Culture/Ideas, her editorial work intersects with the research driving her practice. Moving fluidly between film, photography, drawing, sculpture and video, her work often incorporates archival material to arrive at a prismatic view of the present and address core issues of our time.

== Work ==
"Through a cosmological impulse and experimental process her work collides diverse historical materials and technologies." Her time-based work with slide dissolve is often described as haptic; enfolding screen, viewing space and projection apparatus within the sensory experience. Exploration of the image support is uniquely addressed in her work with sculptural screens constructed of butterflies, buttons, flowers, lead and upholstery. As poet and art critic Barry Schwabsky describes, "Image and reality interfuse… [t]he awareness of the construction image reinforces physical presence, the suggestion of something unconscious, the dream-state, is entirely in keeping with Christine Davis' slide dissolves. It is this dynamic that she makes so vivid, this interaction on the skin of the screen."

Davis' installations seem to propose that meanings from disparate historical and pedagogical contexts overlap and are released slowly over long periods of time. At its core, as film scholar Olivier Asselin has noted, "Davis' work establishes a link between artistic abstraction and scientific abstraction— between formal abstraction and conceptual abstraction. [F]orm is chaotic; it is one of those complex phenomena, like climate change and liquid turbulence, which are determinate, but non-linear, and, as a result, remain largely unpredictable. As such, it prompts an epistemological reflection on the complexity of the sensible and the limits of the concept… from this perspective, her work is archaeological.

In her catalogue essay, "Configurations of the Gaze" philosopher Christine Buci-Glucksmann suggests, "To work violence, in its extreme moments, be it that of the Inquisition or of fascism as in Pasolini's Salò, then to dissimulate that violence within visual and conceptual apparatuses which neutralize it through a perverse and cool disordering: such is the initial paradox of Christine Davis' artistic "scenario," a practice which seeks to capture what, after Pasolini, I would call the "form of the gaze"... [i]t is as if shedding light on violence required an archeology of the image in order that its cruelty, its social effect, be revealed, thus allowing the spectator to discover its implications. Drawn from different regimes — cinema, photography, books — the images function as a kind of palimpsest or abstract... "capturing devices" through whose cold, technological eyes the blindness of the modern is alleviated."

She discusses her distinct methodology at length in a recent interview, "Machines for Thinking."

== Selected exhibitions ==
Davis has shown in many solo and group exhibitions, both in Canada and abroad since the 1980s, such as The Power Plant (Toronto). Her work is in numerous collections including the National Gallery of Canada, and other collections. Publications on her work include monographs published by CREDAC (Paris), MACM (Montreal), AGO (Toronto) and Presentation House (Vancouver).
