= Bottom of the 9th '99 =

1998 video game

- Cover featuring Brady Anderson
- Developer(s): Konami
- Publisher(s): Konami
- Platform(s): PlayStation
- Release: NA: August 31, 1998; JP: October 8, 1998
- Genre(s): Sports (Baseball)
- Mode(s): Single-player, multiplayer

Bottom of the 9th '99, known in Japan as Jikkyou American Baseball 2 (実況アメリカンベースボール2, Jikkyō Amerikan Bēsubōru Tsū, lit. "Real American Baseball 2"), is a baseball video game published and developed by Konami and released in 1998 for the PlayStation.

Baltimore Orioles center fielder Brady Anderson is featured on the cover. Bottom of the 9th '99 does not have a Major League Baseball license, but it is endorsed by the Major League Baseball Players Association. This game has the 1998 opening day rosters with over 700 players. This game has six playing modes: exhibition, season, training, trade, statistics, and scenario mode.

== Reception ==
Reception

Aggregate score
Aggregator	Score
GameRankings	65%

Review scores
Publication	Score
AllGame	2.5/5 stars
Famitsu	22/40
Game Informer	8/10
GamePro	2/5 stars
GameSpot	5/10
IGN	5/10
Official U.S. PlayStation Magazine	3.5/5 stars

The game received "mixed" reviews according to the review aggregation website GameRankings. In Japan, Famitsu gave it a score of 22 out of 40.
