= Chris Davis (baseball) =

American baseball player (born 1986)

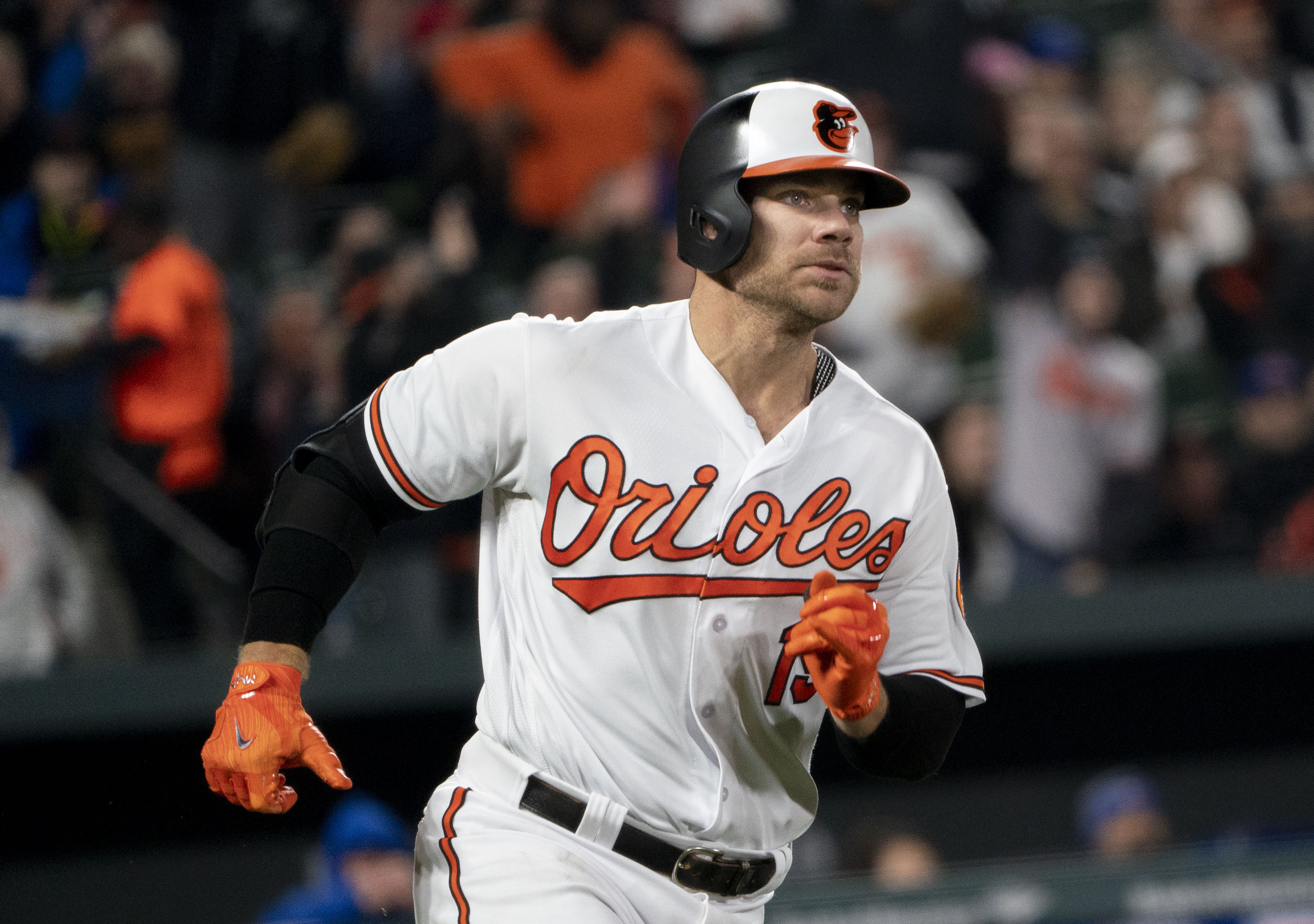
- Davis with the Baltimore Orioles in 2018
- First baseman
- Born: March 17, 1986 (age 40); Longview, Texas, U.S.
- Batted: Left Threw: Right

MLB debut
- June 26, 2008, for the Texas Rangers

Last MLB appearance
- September 11, 2020, for the Baltimore Orioles

MLB statistics
- Batting average: .233
- Home runs: 295
- Runs batted in: 780
- Stats at Baseball Reference

Teams
- Texas Rangers (2008–2011); Baltimore Orioles (2011–2020)

Career highlights and awards
- All-Star (2013); Silver Slugger Award (2013); 2× MLB home run leader (2013, 2015); AL RBI leader (2013)

Christopher Lyn Davis (born March 17, 1986), nicknamed "Crush Davis", is an American former professional baseball first baseman. He played in Major League Baseball (MLB) for the Texas Rangers and Baltimore Orioles. He batted left-handed and threw right-handed. While primarily a first baseman throughout his career, Davis also spent time at designated hitter, third baseman, and outfielder.

Davis attended Navarro Junior College and was selected by the Rangers in the fifth round of the 2006 MLB draft. He ascended quickly through the Rangers' minor league system, getting named their Minor League Player of the Year in 2007. He was called up in the middle of 2008 and had a strong start to his major league career. He was the Rangers' starting first baseman for 92 games in 2009 and hit 21 home runs, but a low batting average and his tendency to strike out left the Rangers dissatisfied with him. Because of this, the Rangers sent Davis back and forth between the minors and the majors over the next two years and left him off their playoff roster in 2010. On July 30, 2011, they traded him to the Orioles.

Davis appeared in 31 games for the Orioles in 2011. In the lineup full-time in 2012, he hit 33 home runs while batting .270 and helping the Orioles reach the playoffs for the first time since 1997. In 2013, his 53 home runs led all MLB players and set a new Orioles single-season franchise record. Davis also had 138 runs batted in (RBI), was selected to the All-Star Game, and finished third in American League Most Valuable Player Award (MVP) voting. In September 2014, Davis was suspended for 25 games for testing positive for amphetamine; he asserted that he tested positive due to the use of Adderall, for which he previously had a "therapeutic use exemption". Davis missed the Orioles' seven postseason games in 2014 due to his suspension.

The Orioles signed Davis to a seven-year, $161 million contract in January 2016. In 2018, he set the MLB record for the lowest batting average ever for a qualified player, batting .168. In 2019, Davis set the MLB record for the most consecutive at bats by a position player without a hit, going 0-for-54. Davis announced his retirement on August 12, 2021. In March 2026, Davis was elected to the Baltimore Orioles Hall of Fame as part of the 2026 induction class.

== High school and college ==
Davis was born in Longview, Texas. He has an older sister, Jennifer. While he was in high school, his parents divorced. Davis attended Longview High School, playing shortstop on the school's varsity baseball team and pitching as well before graduating in 2004. He was originally chosen by the New York Yankees as the third-to-last pick of the 2004 Major League Baseball (MLB) Draft (1,496th overall in the 50th round). However, he did not sign and opted to attend Navarro Junior College in Texas instead, beginning in 2005.

At Navarro, he was used as a third baseman and first baseman. He was once again drafted, by the Los Angeles Angels of Anaheim, in the 2005 MLB draft, however he did not sign. He was named a preseason JUCO All-American by Baseball America in 2006, earning Region XIV East Zone Most Valuable Player honors. That year with Navarro, he hit 17 home runs, one of which hit a retail building 100 feet away beyond the 380 sign on the outfield fence. Davis was then drafted again, this time by the Texas Rangers in the fifth round of the 2006 MLB draft. Davis was inducted to the Navarro College Athletic Hall of Fame in 2021.

== Professional career ==
=== Minor league career ===
Davis began his minor league career in 2006 with the Spokane Indians of the Single-A short season Northwest League, splitting time between the outfield and first base. In 69 games, he batted .277 with 70 hits, 18 doubles, 15 home runs, 42 runs batted in (RBI), and 65 strikeouts (eighth). Early in his minor league career, Davis struggled with his weight. At one point, he weighed 265 pounds, but he later learned to eat healthier and lost weight.

In 2007, Davis began the season with the Bakersfield Blaze of the Single-A advanced California League. He tied a California League record by posting a 35-game hitting streak and was selected to the Single-A advanced All-Star Game. On July 30, he was promoted to the Frisco RoughRiders of the Double-A Texas League, where he spent the rest of the season. Despite his call-up, he tied for fourth in the California League with 24 home runs and ranked fourth in the league with a .573 slugging percentage, leading Bakersfield in home runs, RBI, and doubles. With Frisco, he had 11 home runs and 25 RBI in the month of August and was named the Rangers' Minor League Player of the Month. In 129 games combined, used exclusively as a third baseman, Davis batted .297 with 36 home runs and 118 RBI in 2007. After the season, he was named the Rangers' Tom Grieve Minor League Player of the Year.

Entering 2008, Baseball America ranked Davis the number two prospect in the Rangers' organization, behind Elvis Andrus. Davis began the season playing first base for Frisco. He batted .333 with 62 hits, 13 home runs, and 42 RBI in 46 games before earning a promotion to the Triple-A Oklahoma RedHawks of the Pacific Coast League. In 31 games with Oklahoma, he hit .333 with 37 hits, 10 home runs, and 31 RBI. He was named to the All-Star Futures Game but was unable to play in it because he was promoted to the major leagues by the Texas Rangers. Later, during his breakout 2013 season, Davis referred to his time with Round Rock in 2008: "I know nobody really cares about Triple-A, but I put up these numbers up in Triple-A. That was kind of the question, 'Was he going to be able to do it at the big league level?' The thing about it was, I just couldn't do it consistently. I couldn't put the bat on the ball. I was striking out an astronomical amount, and this year it's just been consistency day in and day out."

=== Texas Rangers ===
==== 2008 ====
On June 26, 2008, the Rangers called up Davis from Oklahoma, and that day he made his major league debut in a 7–2 loss to the Houston Astros, getting a hit in his first Major League at bat, against Óscar Villarreal. Davis started his first Major League game at first base on June 27, 2008, and hit his first Major League home run during the game, against Clay Condrey in an 8–7 win over the Philadelphia Phillies. He also homered the next day, becoming the first Texas Ranger to homer in both of his first two Major League starts. He took over from Frank Catalanotto at first base.

By virtue of his hot start with the Rangers, and his considerable power as a batter, Davis was dubbed "Crush Davis" by local media and fans (a play on "Crash Davis" from the movie Bull Durham). From July 22 through July 26, he had four straight multi-hit games. Davis played well enough that, upon Hank Blalock's return from the disabled list (DL) on August 22, he was moved to third base so he could remain in the lineup. He had four hits on September 26 in a 12–1 victory over the Los Angeles Angels of Anaheim.

In 80 games (295 at bats), Davis batted .285 with 84 hits, 23 doubles, 17 home runs, and 55 RBI. He struck out 88 times, which was 30% of his at bats. Defensively, he was much better at first base than third, with a .997 fielding percentage at first as opposed to a .962 percentage at third and a higher range factor as well.

==== 2009 ====
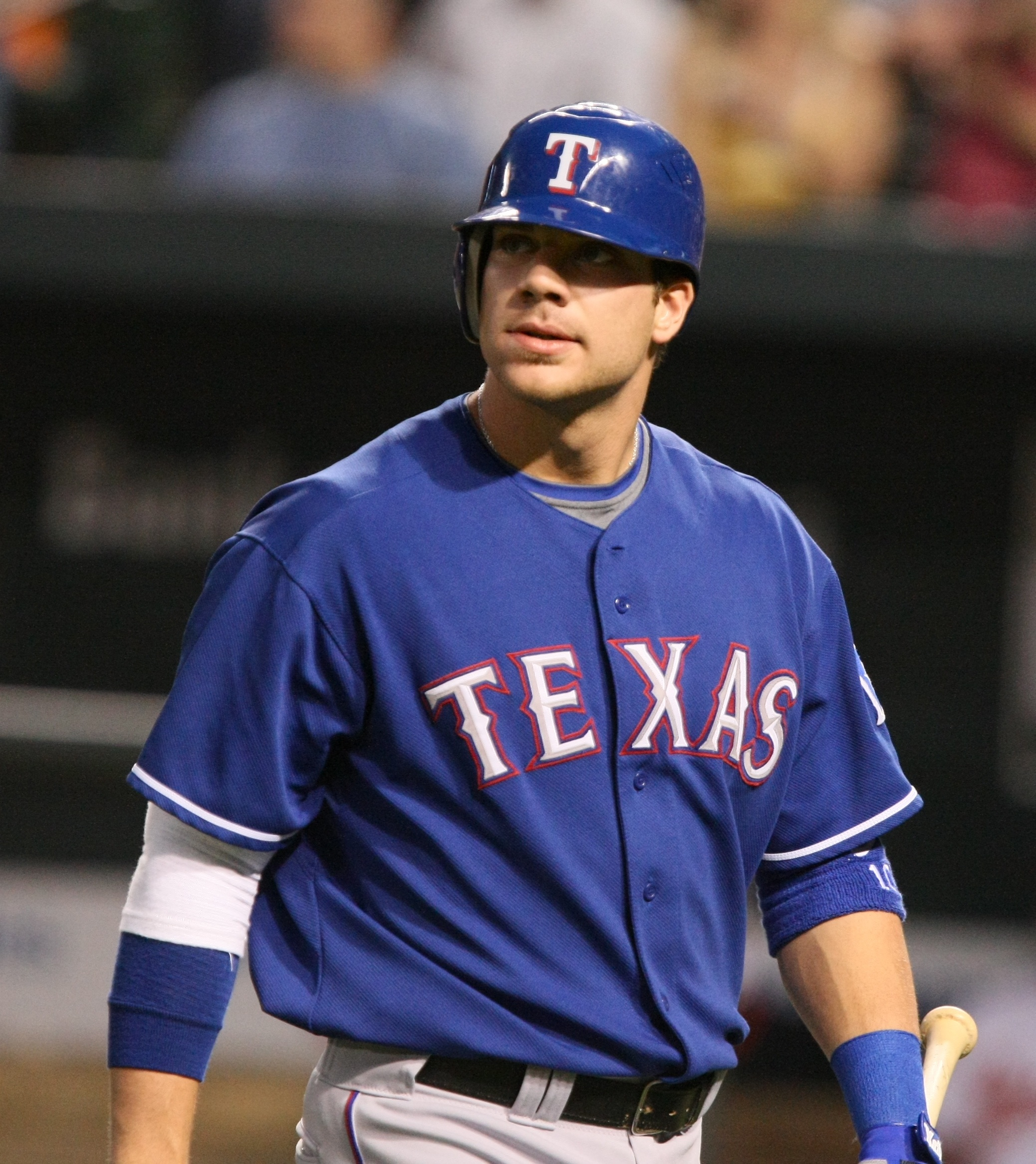
Davis with the Texas Rangers in 2009

Davis slumped a bit in 2009 spring training but still began 2009 as the Rangers' first baseman. Rangers manager Ron Washington said, "I'm not worried about Chris. Chris works hard. He had a little spell where he was trying to get himself together. He's going to have bad times, but what he did tonight is what he's capable of and he'll do that enough to make you love him." On May 14, with the Rangers trailing 2–1 in the ninth inning against the Seattle Mariners, he homered against Brandon Morrow to give the Rangers a 3–2 victory. After a 1-for-29 slump, Davis hit two home runs on May 26 in a 7–3 victory over the New York Yankees. He had four hits on June 25, the fourth a 12th-inning two-run home run against Esmerling Vásquez in a 9–8 victory over the Arizona Diamondbacks.

On July 5, Davis was sent back down to make room for Josh Hamilton who was coming off the disabled list. Although he had 15 home runs in 258 at bats, he was leading the American League with 114 strikeouts and had, on June 21, become the quickest player in Major League history to reach 100 strikeouts, requiring only 219 at bats. His batting average was at .202. While talking about the Rangers' handling of another player, Julio Borbon, in 2010, Washington mentioned the decision to send Davis down in 2009: "We gave Chris a good amount of time last year. With young players, they can look bad for 100 at bats and then turn it around the next 100 and look exactly like you want them to." With the RedHawks, Davis played 44 games, batting .327 with six home runs, 12 doubles, and 30 RBI.

Davis was recalled on August 25 after Andruw Jones went on the DL and Blalock struggled. On September 8, in the second game of a doubleheader, he had three hits and four RBI, including a three-run home run against José Veras in a 10–5 victory over the Cleveland Indians. When Davis returned to the majors, his numbers improved dramatically, as he hit .318 in September and October, with five home runs and 21 RBIs in the two-month span. In 113 games (391 at bats), Davis batted .238 with 93 hits, 15 doubles, 21 home runs, and 59 RBI. However, he ranked seventh in the AL with 150 strikeouts. He did do well defensively; Washington said, when Blalock replaced him at first following his demotion, "We can't expect Hank Blalock to be Chris Davis [defensively], but Hank is a professional. I think he can play first base."

==== 2010 ====
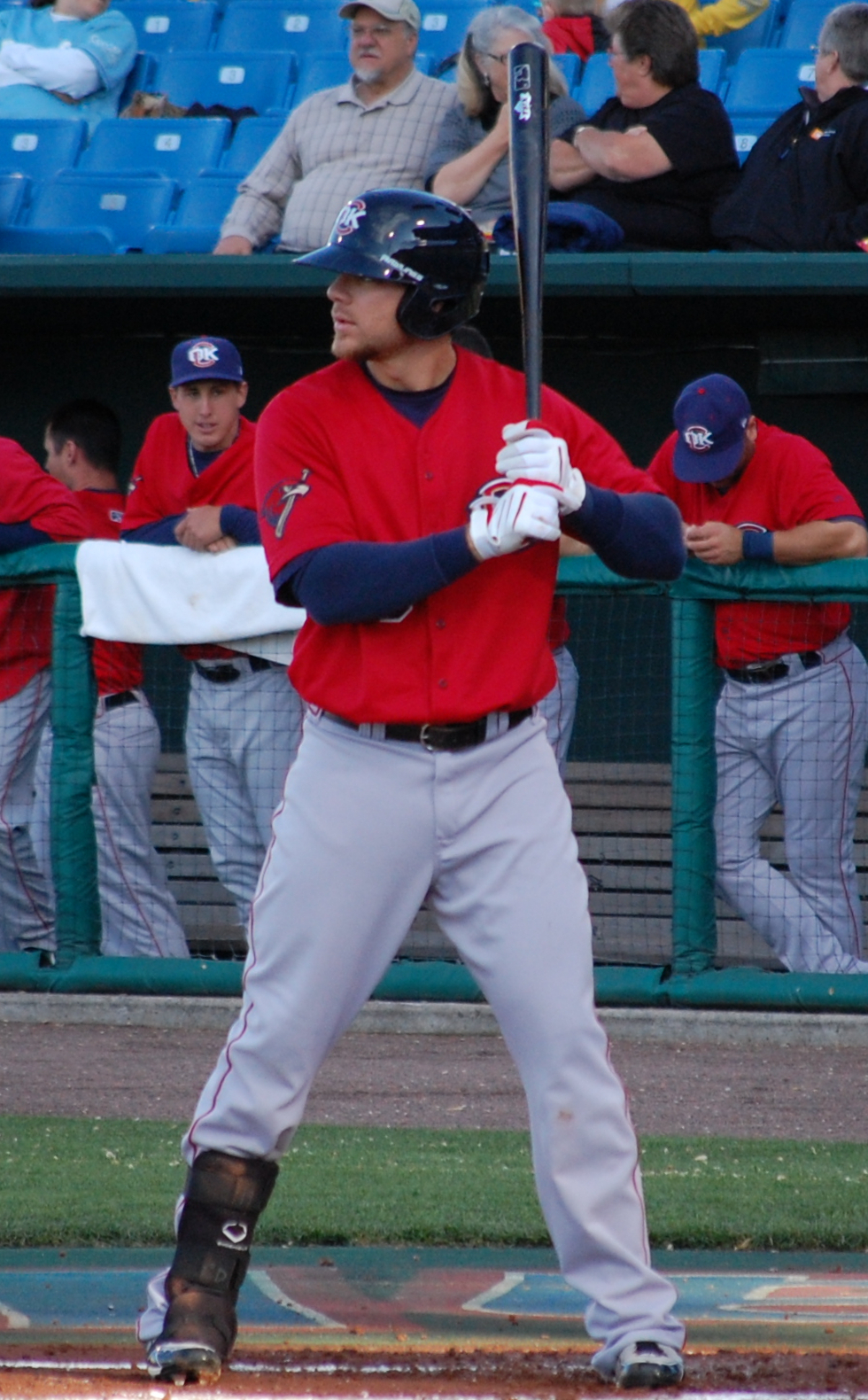
Davis batting for the Oklahoma City RedHawks in 2010

Davis was once again optioned to Triple-A after starting 2010 batting .188 in 15 games (48 at bats). He was recalled on July 9 to play first base for the Rangers. A roster spot, as well as a position in the Rangers starting lineup, became available when Justin Smoak was involved in a trade with the Seattle Mariners for Cliff Lee. On July 29, he was sent back to the RedHawks to make room for Mitch Moreland. In 103 games (398 at bats) with the RedHawks, he had 130 hits, 31 doubles, 14 home runs, and 80 RBI. He finished second in the league in hitting (.327, behind John Lindsey's .353) and fifth in strikeouts (105). He was recalled for the final time on September 11 but this time was used as a backup corner infielder and pinch-hitter, as Moreland was playing first base. In 45 games (120 at bats) with Texas, Davis hit .192 with 23 hits, one home run, and four RBI. He was left off the postseason roster as the Rangers entered the World Series for the first time ever but ended up losing in five games to the San Francisco Giants.

Attempting to aid Davis's offense, the Rangers tried to get Davis to widen his batting stance. However, playing in the Dominican Winter League over the offseason, Davis "felt like I fouled a lot of pitches off that I should have driven." He stood more upright and kept his feet closer together and, in 2013, said that this was a defining moment in his career.

==== 2011 ====
In 2011, Davis began the season in the minors but was called up from Triple-A to play for the Rangers on April 11 when Hamilton suffered a fracture of the humerus bone in his shoulder. However, it was with reluctance that the Rangers recalled Davis; general manager Jon Daniels said, "We talked about another center fielder or a third catcher and think we will address that at some point. But whoever we called up wasn't going to get regular playing time, so we felt Chris was the most deserving." Used in a part-time role, Davis remained with the club until Hamilton came off the DL on May 23. He was also called up for a game on June 8 when Ian Kinsler was placed on paternity leave. His 2011 totals with the Rangers were a .250 batting average with 19 hits, three home runs, and six RBI in 28 games (76 at bats). Davis fared better with the Rangers' Triple-A affiliate, which had become the Round Rock Express in 2011. He had five-RBI games twice and in June batted .361 with 10 home runs and 28 RBI. Despite playing only 48 games with Round Rock in 2011, Davis finished seventh in the Pacific Coast League with 24 home runs.

=== Baltimore Orioles ===
==== 2011 ====
On July 30, 2011, Davis was traded with pitcher Tommy Hunter to the Baltimore Orioles for reliever Koji Uehara. Davis became expendable because the Rangers felt Moreland was a better option at first base. Rangers general manager Jon Daniels said the day of the trade that he knew there was a possibility Davis could turn into a high-impact offensive player, and "If he does, we'll live with it." Opinions differed as to Davis's inability to hold a consistent starting role with the Rangers. While one popular idea was that it was because of his many strikeouts and low batting average, Orioles manager Buck Showalter believed it was due to the presence of Moreland and Adrián Beltré in Texas. Davis said, "I'm glad to get the opportunity to come here", citing his desire to play every day.

In his second game as an Oriole, on August 2, Davis homered for his first Oriole hit. It came against Everett Teaford, in an 8–2 victory over the Kansas City Royals. He received everyday playing time but went on the DL on August 14 with a right shoulder strain, an injury which was initially feared to be season-ending but wound up keeping him out only until September 6. In an 11-inning 5–4 victory over the Yankees on September 7, he struck out five times, the first Oriole to strike out that many times since Phil Bradley did so exactly 22 years before. He had three-hit games on September 8 and 19. On September 14, he had a season-high three RBI with a three-run home run against Wade Davis in a 6–2 victory over the Tampa Bay Rays.

Davis played 31 games for the Orioles, batting .276/.310/.398 with 34 hits, two home runs, 13 RBIs, and 39 strikeouts in 123 at bats. In a combined 59 games with Texas and Baltimore, he batted .266 with 53 hits, 12 doubles, five home runs, 19 RBI, and 63 strikeouts.

==== 2012 ====
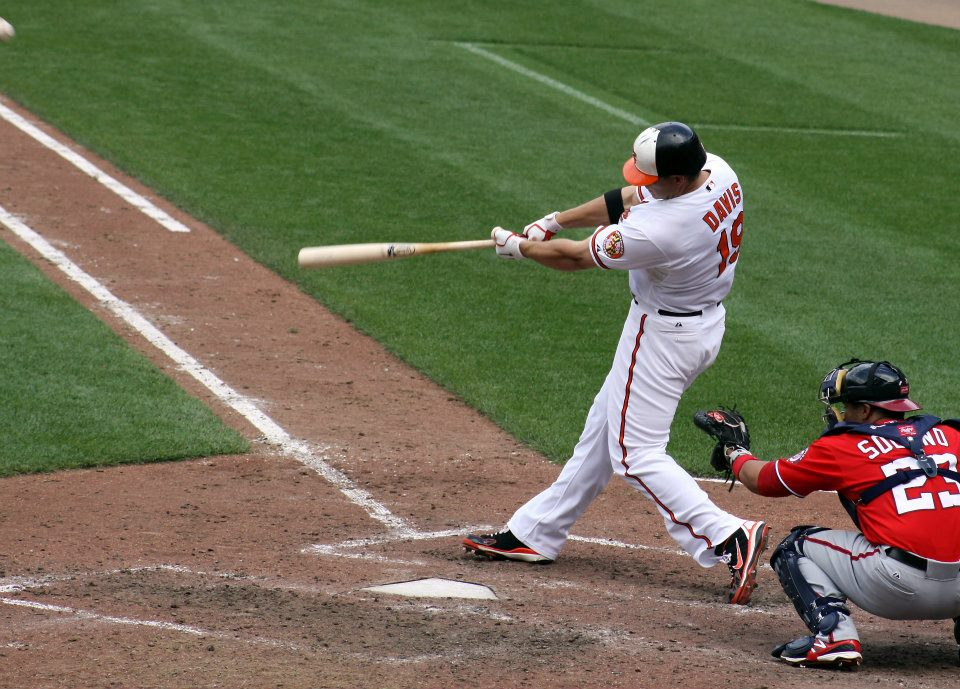
Davis swings during a 2012 game vs. the Washington Nationals

Davis received everyday playing time in 2012, starting at first base, at designated hitter, and in the outfield throughout the season. On May 6, in a 17-inning, 9–6 victory over the Boston Red Sox at Fenway Park, Davis went hitless in eight at bats, but ended up being the winning pitcher. His feat was the first of its kind since pitcher Rube Waddell achieved it on July 4, 1905. Davis was the designated hitter until he was pressed into service as a relief pitcher in the 16th inning after Showalter had depleted the Orioles' bullpen. He struck out two batters and did not allow a run in his two innings of mound work. He was the first position player in the American League (AL) to be the winning pitcher in a game since Rocky Colavito on August 25, 1968, and the first to pitch for the Orioles since Manny Alexander on April 19, 1996. He and losing pitcher Darnell McDonald were the first position players on opposing teams in the same contest to each work in relief since Ty Cobb and George Sisler on October 4, 1925, and the first where both earned pitching decisions since Sam Mertes and Jesse Burkett on September 28, 1902.

On July 31, Davis hit his first career grand slam, off Yankees pitcher Iván Nova in an 11–5 win after the Orioles had faced a five-run deficit. On August 24, Davis had his first career three-homer game in a 6–4 victory over the Toronto Blue Jays. His second home run was his 22nd of the season, setting a new career high, and it marked the first three-homer game by an Oriole since Nick Markakis had one in 2006. After Markakis suffered a season-ending injury on September 8, Davis moved to right field for the remainder of the season and the playoffs.

After a late-season stretch in which he homered six times in the final six games, Davis finished the regular season with 33 home runs, more than any other Oriole. In 139 games (515 at bats), he batted .270/.326/.501 with 139 hits, 20 doubles, and 85 RBI. His 33 home runs also tied Robinson Canó for eighth in the AL while his 169 strikeouts tied B. J. Upton for fourth.

The Orioles reached the playoffs for the first time since 1997, claiming one of the AL Wild Card spots and defeating the Rangers in the 2012 AL Wild Card Game. In Game 2 of the 2012 AL Division Series (ALDS) against the Yankees, Davis had a two-run single against Andy Pettitte in the Orioles' 3–2 victory. Those were his only RBI of the series; he had four hits in 20 at bats as the Yankees defeated the Orioles in five games.

==== 2013 ====
The Orioles decided to put Davis at first base full-time in 2013 and worked on his defense in spring training; later, Oriole coaches and teammates believed this helped Davis succeed at the plate as well. He set a personal home run goal before the season but refused to share it. On April 5, Davis set a new Major League record with 16 RBI in the first four games of a season. He also became the fourth MLB player in history to homer in each of the first four games of the season (Nelson Cruz, Mark McGwire, Willie Mays), including a grand slam against Tyler Robertson in the fourth game, a 9–5 victory over the Minnesota Twins.

On June 16, he hit the 100th home run of his career, off Red Sox pitcher Jon Lester in a 6–3 victory. On July 11, he hit his 34th home run of the season, eclipsing his previous season high in a 3–1 victory over the Rangers. He earned his 87th and 88th RBIs of the season with a two-run home run against Mark Buehrle on July 12, setting a new Orioles record for most RBIs before the All-Star break; the previous record was 86 by Boog Powell. He ultimately ended up with 93 RBIs before the All-Star break. On July 14, he hit his 37th home run of the season against Josh Johnson in a 7–4 victory over the Toronto Blue Jays, tying Reggie Jackson for the second most home runs before the All-Star break by any MLB player and the most by an American League player. The home run was also his 500th career hit.

Davis received a tweet on June 30 from Michael Tran in Michigan asking him if he had ever used steroids. He responded "No", that same day. Davis said later in an interview, "I have not ever taken any PEDs. I'm not sure fans realize, we have the strictest drug testing in all of sports, even more than the Olympics. If anybody was going to try to cheat in our game, they couldn't. It's impossible to try to beat the system. Anyway, I've never taken PEDs, no. I wouldn't. Half the stuff on the list I can't even pronounce." Later, Davis would say that he believed Roger Maris's 61 home run season was the true single-season home run record, due to the steroid scandal surrounding Barry Bonds, Sammy Sosa, and Mark McGwire.

On July 6, Davis was elected to start the 2013 All-Star Game, his first ever appearance. He was the leading vote-getter with 8,272,243 votes. Davis was also chosen to participate in the Home Run Derby for the first time, by American League captain Robinson Canó. Davis advanced to the second round and hit a total of 12 home runs. However, a blister broke on his hand, leaving him unable to hit enough homers to advance to the third and final round. At the All-Star Game the next night, July 16, 2013, Davis went 1–3, with a fly out, a single and a strikeout. Davis's single against Patrick Corbin advanced Miguel Cabrera to third, where he would score the game's first run on José Bautista's sacrifice fly.

Davis's 50th home run of the season, which he hit on September 13, tied him with Brady Anderson for the Orioles record of most home runs in a single season. He also became only the third player in MLB history, after Babe Ruth (New York Yankees, 1921) and Albert Belle (Cleveland Indians, 1995), to hit 50 home runs and 40 doubles in a single season. He hit his 51st home run on September 17, setting a new Orioles single season record. This was also his 92nd extra-base hit of the season, again tying Anderson for a franchise record. He later surpassed that by hitting his first triple of the season against Alex Cobb on September 21 in a 5–1 loss to Tampa Bay. Davis broke another Orioles record on September 27 with his 28th home run of the season hit at his home park of Camden Yards, surpassing Frank Robinson's record of 27 home runs hit at Memorial Stadium in 1966.

In 2013, Davis led all MLB batters in home runs (53), runs batted in (138), extra-base hits (96), and total bases (370). His 53 home runs, 96 extra-base hits, and 199 strikeouts all set new Orioles single-season records. In AL Most Valuable Player Award (MVP) voting, Davis finished third behind Cabrera and Mike Trout, as the Orioles failed to return to the playoffs.

Davis's breakout year led to compliments from his peers. Teammate Adam Jones summarized his style: "Most of his home runs are just line drives that get out. Obviously he hits some moonshots too." Cliff Lee, Davis's teammate in Texas in 2010, said, "Watching his highlights, you can totally tell that he's relaxed and just letting it happen. He's not putting anything extra into it. It's just nice and easy, and it's impressive to watch. ... He and Miguel Cabrera are the two best power hitters in the game, in my opinion."

==== 2014 ====
Davis missed 12 games from April 26, 2014, to May 11, 2014, with a left oblique strain. He hit three home runs and had five RBI on May 20 in a 9–2 victory over the Pittsburgh Pirates. On June 17, facing Érik Bédard with the bases loaded, Davis hit a ball to left field that hit off the foul pole at Tropicana Field. Initially ruled a double, the umpires changed it to a grand slam after a review. The Orioles went on to defeat the Rays 7–5. After a 4-for-36 slump, Davis was benched on June 23, but he had a pinch-hit walk off three-run home run against Ronald Belisario, giving the Orioles a 6–4 victory over the Chicago White Sox. It was the Orioles' first game-ending pinch hit home run since Larry Sheets had one on August 24, 1988.

Davis struggled in the first half of 2014, hitting 15 home runs but batting around .200. The slump continued, as he batted .202 in July and saw himself dropped to seventh in the batting order in August. Showalter said, "It's hard to follow that pace. He spoiled us at a very high level. He wants to get back to it." Despite his slump, the Orioles through August 23 had built a seven-game lead in the AL East.

On September 12, Davis was suspended for 25 games for testing positive for amphetamine. Davis claimed he tested positive due to the use of Adderall, for which he previously had a "therapeutic use exemption", although he did not have that exemption for the 2014 season. Davis' suspension covered the final 17 games of the 2014 regular season and the seven games the Orioles played in the 2014 postseason.

For the 2014 season, he batted .196 (the lowest batting average among all qualified MLB batters)/.300/.404 with 26 home runs and 173 strikeouts (3rd in the AL) in 450 at bats.

==== 2015 ====
Davis received a therapeutic use exemption for Vyvanse, a stimulant drug, prior to the 2015 season. He served the final game of his suspension on Opening Day.

Davis led the majors in home runs with 47 in 2015. He struck out a major-league-leading 31.0% of the time, batting .262/.361/.562. He led the league in strikeouts (with 208) and was 2nd in the AL in RBIs (117).

==== 2016 ====
On January 21, 2016, Davis signed a seven-year, $161 million contract to stay with the Orioles. The contract was the largest in Orioles history. In 159 games of 2016, Davis finished the year with a .221/.332/.459 batting line. He hit 38 home runs (finishing eighth in the American League) and drove in 84 runs. He also struck out an MLB-leading 219 times.

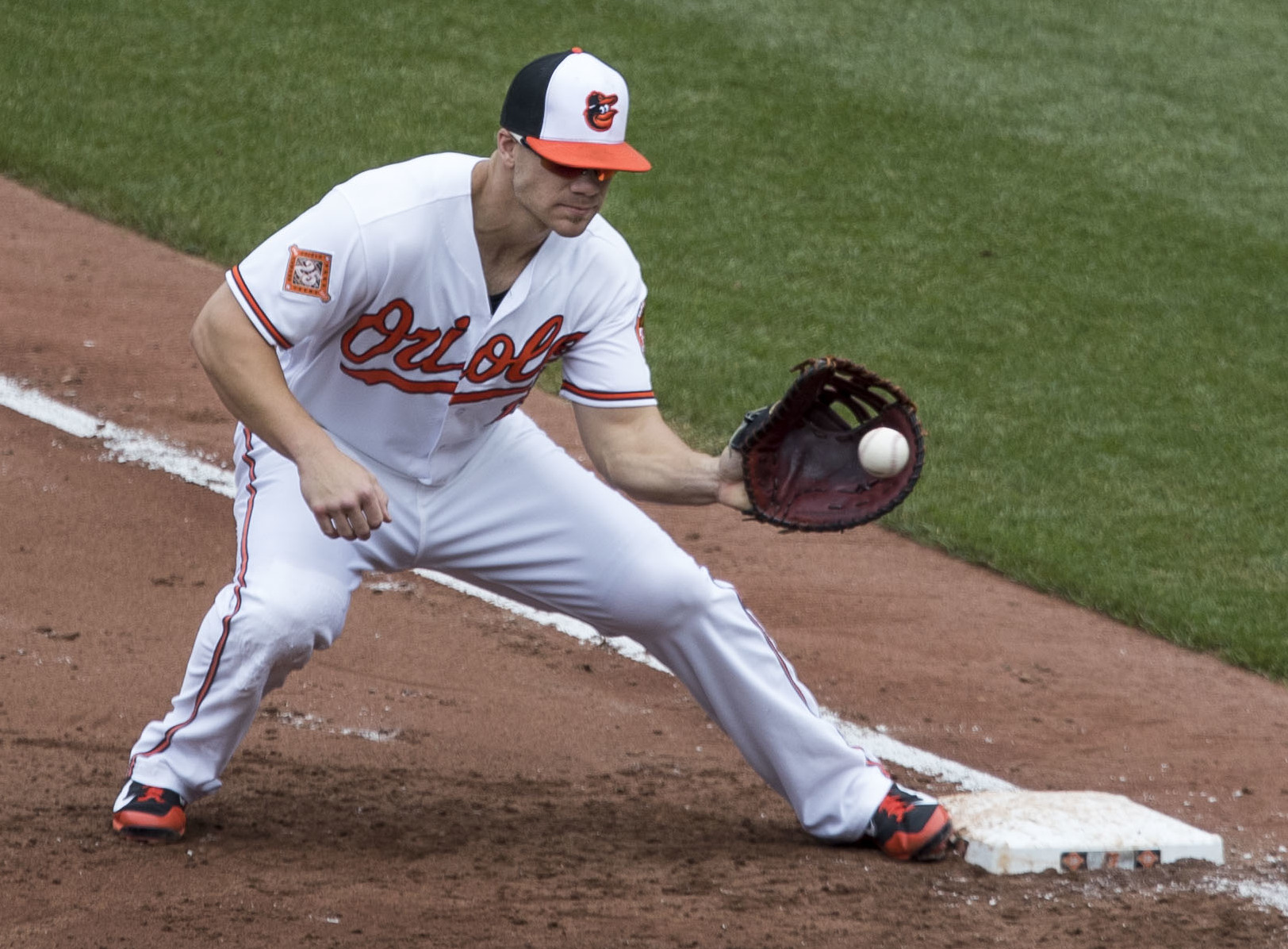
Davis at first base in 2017

==== 2017 ====
During 2017, Davis spent a month on the disabled list with a right oblique strain. For the 2017 season, Davis batted .215/.309/.423. He had 195 strikeouts (third in the American League) and batted .208/.293/.326 against left-handers while hitting 26 home runs.

==== 2018 ====
Davis started the 2018 season with a .150 batting average and 86 strikeouts in his first 57 games. On June 15, the Orioles announced that Davis would be benched and that they would call up Corban Joseph. Davis ended the season hitting .168/.243/.296 with 16 home runs. He also had 192 strikeouts (placing fourth in the American League in that category) in 128 games. His $23 million salary was the 10th-highest in the league. His .168 batting average, .243 on base percentage, and .296 slugging percentage were each the lowest of all qualified major league batters, and the .168 batting average was the lowest of all time for qualified MLB hitters.

==== 2019 ====
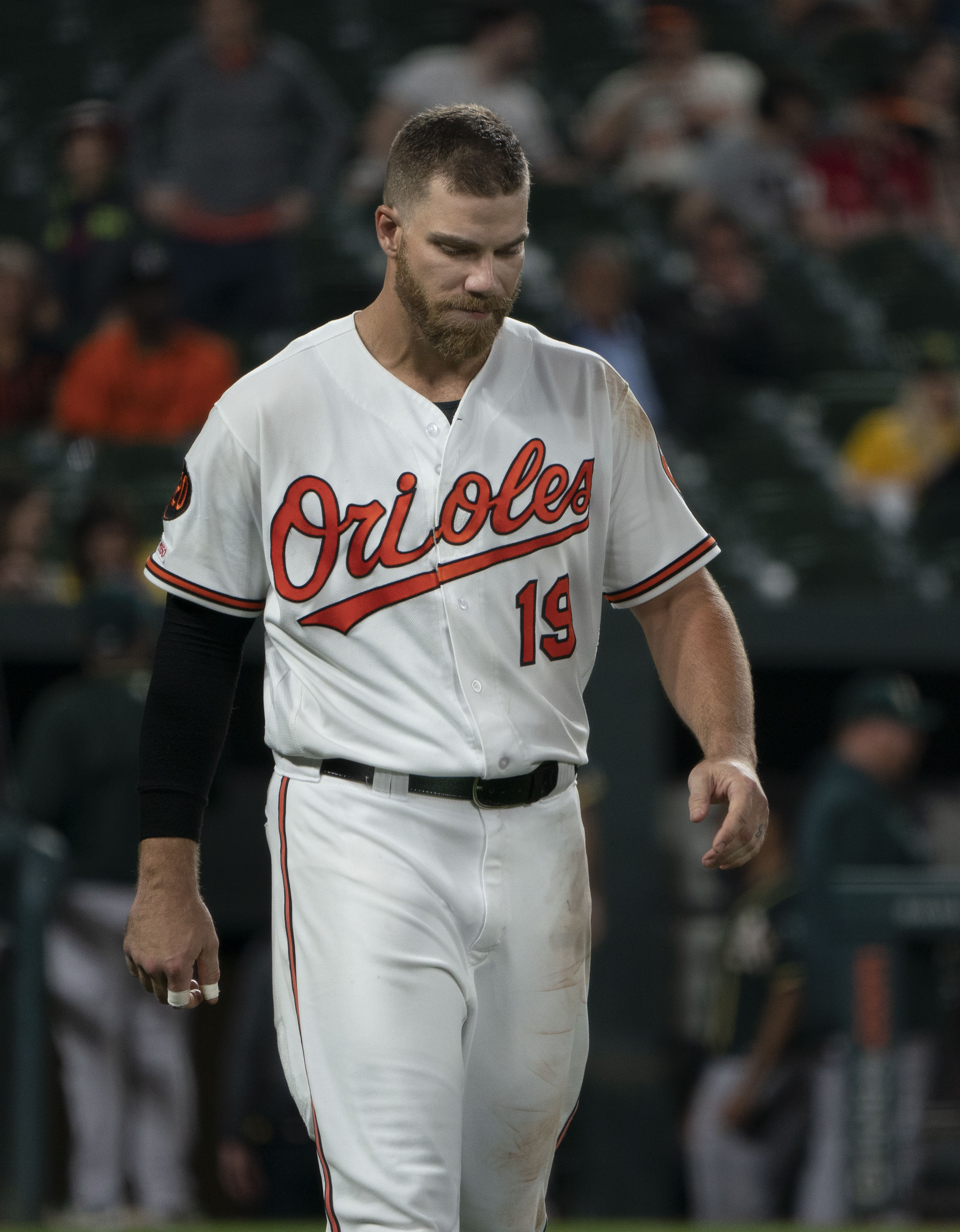
Davis in 2019 after his 49th consecutive at-bat without a hit

At the end of the 2018 season, starting September 14, Davis began a hitless streak that lasted through his last 21 at bats of the season and continued into 2019. On April 8, 2019, Davis set a new Major League record for the most consecutive at bats by a position player without a hit (46). Davis ended his streak on April 13, after 54 consecutive at bats without a hit, with a two-run single against the Red Sox.

Davis was placed on the 10-day disabled list due to left hip inflammation on May 26, 2019.

On August 7, during a loss to the Yankees, Davis had to be physically restrained by Orioles' players and coaches after attempting to go after manager Brandon Hyde. Davis finished the season with a .179 batting average and 12 home runs in 105 games.

==== 2020 ====
Davis played in 16 games for the Orioles in 2020 and hit .115 with no home runs and only one RBI. His season ended early due to a knee injury.

==== 2021 ====
On March 26, 2021, Davis was placed on the 60-day injured list with a lower back strain. On May 19, it was announced that Davis would miss the entire 2021 season after undergoing arthroscopic surgery on his left hip.

On August 12, 2021, Davis announced his retirement from baseball. Davis's production had declined amidst injury struggles during his last few seasons. During the course of the contract he signed in 2016, Davis batted .196/.291/.379, with 92 home runs. At the time of his retirement, Davis was owed $17 million in deferred salary for the 2022 season, as well as $42 million in deferred payments from his 2016 contract. He was scheduled to be paid $9.16 million per year between 2023 and 2025, $3.5 million between 2026 and 2032, and $1.4 million between 2033 and 2037.

== Coaching career ==
In July 2025, Davis served as a coach for the United States national under-18 baseball team's development program in Cary, North Carolina.

== Personal life ==
Davis, his wife Jill and their three daughters live in Baltimore, Maryland, and Flower Mound, Texas. Before that, they lived in Arlington, Texas. They married in 2011. During the offseason, he enjoys bass fishing.

Davis is a Christian. Growing up, his parents took him to First Baptist Church in Longview, but Davis said it was not until after his difficult 2010 season that he "finally grasped true faith" and began reading the Bible daily.

Davis and his wife are supporters of Compassion International. They have sponsored children and have funded several large projects through the charity. During the COVID-19 pandemic, they pledged to give $1 million to the charity.

== See also ==
- 50 home run club
- List of Baltimore Orioles awards
- List of Baltimore Orioles team records
- List of Major League Baseball annual home run leaders
- List of Major League Baseball annual putouts leaders
- List of Major League Baseball annual runs batted in leaders
- List of Major League Baseball career home run leaders
- List of Major League Baseball career strikeouts by batters leaders
