= Christopher James Davis =

British-Barbadian physician (1840–1870)

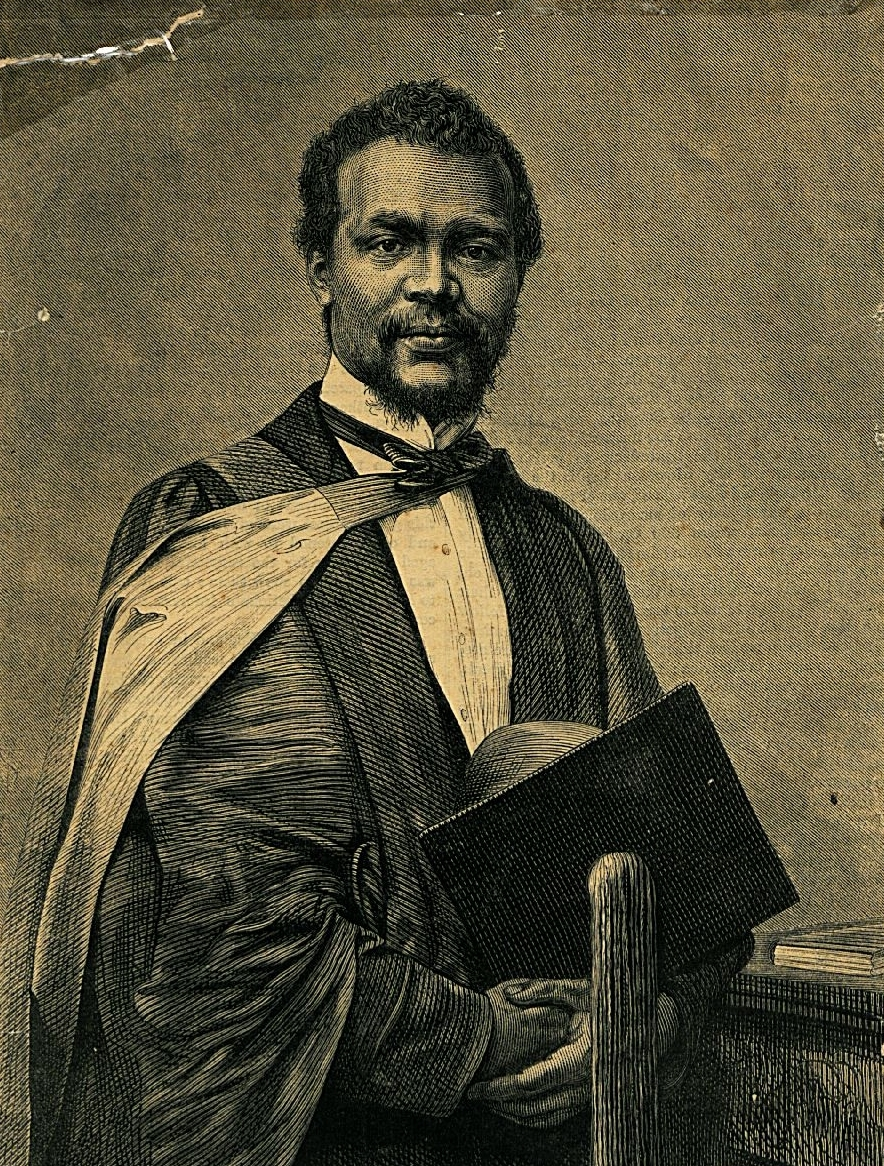
- Born: 22 April 1840; Bridgetown, Barbados
- Died: 27 November 1870 (aged 30)
- Education: University of Aberdeen
- Occupation: Physician

Christopher James Davis (22 April 1840 – 27 November 1870) was a British-Barbadian medical doctor. Educated in Europe, he volunteered to help sick and injured during the Franco-Prussian War in 1870, where he died from smallpox.

== Childhood ==
Davis was born in Bridgetown, Barbados, into a family of ten children. His family were Wesleyan Methodists. His father was British, his mother a Barbadian. "Of all my children," wrote his mother, "he seemed the most tender and considerate for me, and would weep himself to sleep if anything tired me."

== Career ==
Davis studied to become a school teacher and was a lay-preacher in the Wesleyan Methodist Church. The Plymouth Brethren movement had recently spread from British Guyana to Barbados and other West Indian colonies. Their teachings were imbibed by Davis and he began to propagate them. Three of his own family also joined the Brethren.

Limerick-born Dr. Thomas Mackern of Blackheath, South-East London, visited the West Indies in 1866 to preach the gospel and to promote the literature work of the Plymouth Brethren in the islands. He met numerous Christians who had then recently broken with their denominational associations. He wrote: "They had begun 'amidst much opposition from professing Christians' to gather 'simply to the name of the Lord Jesus' – which meant that Brethren assemblies were functioning. The one chiefly responsible for this development was the young schoolmaster, C. J. Davis who for some time had been a local preacher among the Wesleyans."

By 1866, he had sailed to Britain to study medicine with the intention to return to practise medicine in the West Indies. He settled in the north London suburb of Stoke Newington in the home of a Mr Holland. Davis became one of the House Physicians at St Bartholomew's Hospital, where in the first year of study, he gained the examiner's prize for proficiency in practical anatomy, and a junior scholarship in anatomy, physiology and chemistry.

He was an able and earnest evangelist. He preached to large congregations with much accompanying blessing in many parts of the British Isles. He records in his gospel tracts some of the locations he visited; these include Margate, Woolwich and Sheffield in England, Dunoon and Aberdeen in Scotland. He pursued his medical studies at the University of Aberdeen, where he completed his degree of MD.

He cut a very striking figure and quickly drew crowds when preaching in the open air. A contemporary friend, a Harley Street doctor, A. T. Schofield, wrote that Davis was "a tall and distinguished looking man". He used to preach from a kitchen table in Union Street, Aberdeen, the result of which was the establishment of a very large assembly of Brethren in that city. In Aberdeen he delivered a series of lectures, which were published the year of his death as Aids to Believers. He also wrote a tract on The Lord's Coming, and an evangelistic book, The Grace of God.

His Aids to Believers ran through at least 18 editions in the first half of the 20th century. His final evangelistic narrative, The Teachers Taught, is in print with a number of publishers.

== Franco-Prussian War ==
During the Franco-Prussian War in 1870, Davis volunteered his services to assist the suffering and cholera-stricken peasantry of eastern France, especially at the Battle of Sedan. He devoted himself with skill and energy to the treatment of large numbers of sick and wounded and to the establishment of soup kitchens that gave food and life to multitudes of starving people. He was an enthusiast for his soup kitchens, to the extent that, on one occasion, when the sister of the Protestant Pastor at Sedan (Miss Goulden) told him there was not sufficient soup, he took his watch from his pocket, gained as a prize at College, and sold it to pay for the immediate needs.

For this war-work Mr and Mrs Chrimes of Moorgate, Rotherham, England, made the young physician almoner of a thousand pounds for the poor and sick among whom he laboured. Dr Davis also ran an ambulance, which was well regarded in the neighbourhood.

He also took care of several hundred wounded Bavarians in dire need of aid. It was in this final benevolent service in war-torn Europe that he assumed the nickname: "The Good Black Doctor".

== Death ==
Two Englishwomen, Emma Maria Pearson and Louisa Elisabeth MacLaughlin, wrote this of him:

"Dr. Davis, at Pongy-sur-Meuse, had 300 sick and wounded, all Bavarians. ... Fever and diarrhoea were very prevalent, especially amongst the Bavarian troops, who ate large quantities of unripe grapes and apples. An application was made by a physician of colour, Dr. Davis, of St. Bartholomew's Hospital, who had established a hospital just across the Meuse for the services of Louise and myself in his Ambulance, not so much to nurse the sick (he had no wounded), but to see that the German orderlies did their duty, and to prevent the entrance of green fruit. Davis died of smallpox, about two months afterwards, at Pongy-sur-Meuse, where he had his Ambulance, beloved, and mourned by all who had ever come in contact with him."

"But his enthusiasm", said The Lancet medical journal, "carried him beyond his strength, and, returning in an exhausted condition from a short visit to England, where he had been to seek further funds, he was attacked with small-pox, of which he died on the 27th November, at the age of twenty-eight". Davis was greatly loved for his impartial service upon his death was given a military funeral which was followed by troops of both armies, headed by the Mayor of Sedan. His tombstone records the high esteem in which he was held. He was buried in the quiet graveyard of Fond de Givonne, just outside Sedan.

In one of his tracts, the Grace Appearing and reigning; Glory to Appear, Davis wrote, "go out and visit the sick – feed the hungry; and if you have the gift, explain the word of life to the poor and ignorant ... All can do good in some way; with time or worldly goods ... this is our time to do as receivers of grace. In health or sickness to adorn the doctrine of Christ our Saviour."

William Joseph Lowe, another Plymouth Brother, also visited Sedan and wrote a description of his tour.
