= 1980 Baltimore Orioles season =

Major League Baseball season

1980 Baltimore Orioles
- League: American League
- Division: East
- Ballpark: Memorial Stadium
- City: Baltimore, Maryland
- Record: 100–62 (.617)
- Divisional place: 2nd
- Owners: Edward Bennett Williams
- General managers: Hank Peters
- Managers: Earl Weaver
- Television: WMAR-TV
- Radio: WFBR (Chuck Thompson, Bill O'Donnell, Tom Marr)

The 1980 Baltimore Orioles season was the franchise's 27th season in Baltimore. It involved the Orioles finishing 2nd in the American League East with a record of 100 wins and 62 losses. This was the last season the Orioles would win 100+ games until 2023.

== Offseason ==
- December 6, 1979: John Flinn was traded by the Orioles to the Milwaukee Brewers for Lenn Sakata.

=== Spring training ===
The Orioles played two spring training exhibition games at the Louisiana Superdome against the New York Yankees over the weekend of March 15 and 16, 1980. 45,152 spectators watched the Yankees beat the Orioles 9 to 3 on March 15, 1980. The following day, 43,339 fans saw Floyd Rayford lead the Orioles to a 7 to 1 win over the Yankees.

== Regular season ==
During the season, Steve Stone became the last pitcher to win at least 25 games for the Orioles in the 20th century.

=== Season standings ===
AL East
Team	W	L	Pct.	GB	Home	Road
New York Yankees	103	59	.636	—	53‍–‍28	50‍–‍31
Baltimore Orioles	100	62	.617	3	50‍–‍31	50‍–‍31
Milwaukee Brewers	86	76	.531	17	40‍–‍42	46‍–‍34
Boston Red Sox	83	77	.519	19	36‍–‍45	47‍–‍32
Detroit Tigers	84	78	.519	19	43‍–‍38	41‍–‍40
Cleveland Indians	79	81	.494	23	44‍–‍35	35‍–‍46
Toronto Blue Jays	67	95	.414	36	35‍–‍46	32‍–‍49

=== Record vs. opponents ===
1980 American League record Sources:
Team	BAL	BOS	CAL	CWS	CLE	DET	KC	MIL	MIN	NYY	OAK	SEA	TEX	TOR
Baltimore	—	8–5	10–2	6–6	6–7	10–3	6–6	7–6	10–2	7–6	7–5	6–6	6–6	11–2
Boston	5–8	—	9–3	6–4	7–6	8–5	5–7	6–7	6–6	3–10	9–3	7–5	5–7	7–6
California	2–10	3–9	—	3–10	4–6	5–7	5–8	6–6	7–6	2–10	3–10	11–2	11–2	3–9
Chicago	6–6	4–6	10–3	—	5–7	2–10	5–8	5–7	5–8	5–7	6–7	6–7	6–7–2	5–7
Cleveland	7–6	6–7	6–4	7–5	—	3–10	5–7	3–10	9–3	5–8	6–6	8–4	6–6	8–5
Detroit	3–10	5–8	7–5	10–2	10–3	—	2–10	7–6	6–6	5–8	6–6	10–2–1	4–8	9–4
Kansas City	6–6	7–5	8–5	8–5	7–5	10–2	—	6–6	5–8	8–4	6–7	7–6	10–3	9–3
Milwaukee	6–7	7–6	6–6	7–5	10–3	6–7	6–6	—	7–5	5–8	7–5	9–3	5–7	5–8
Minnesota	2–10	6–6	6–7	8–5	3–9	6–6	8–5	5–7	—	4–8	6–7	7–6	9–3	7–5
New York	6–7	10–3	10–2	7–5	8–5	8–5	4–8	8–5	8–4	—	8–4	9–3	7–5	10–3
Oakland	5–7	3–9	10–3	7–6	6–6	6–6	7–6	5–7	7–6	4–8	—	8–5	7–6	8–4
Seattle	6–6	5–7	2–11	7–6	4–8	2–10–1	6–7	3–9	6–7	3–9	5–8	—	4–9	6–6
Texas	6–6	7–5	2–11	7–6–2	6–6	8–4	3–10	7–5	3–9	5–7	6–7	9–4	—	7–5
Toronto	2–11	6–7	9–3	7–5	5–8	4–9	3–9	8–5	5–7	3–10	4–8	6–6	5–7	—

=== Notable transactions ===
- April 3, 1980: Billy Smith was released by the Orioles.
- April 5, 1980: Steve Luebber was signed as a free agent by the Orioles.
- April 21, 1980: Paul Hartzell was signed as a free agent by the Orioles.
- May 13, 1980: Dave Skaggs was purchased from the Orioles by the California Angels.
- June 3, 1980: 1980 Major League Baseball draft
  - Carl Nichols was drafted by the Orioles in the 4th round.
  - Mark Brown was drafted by the Orioles in the 6th round.
  - Ricky Jones was drafted by the Orioles in the 15th round.

=== Roster ===
1980 Baltimore Orioles
Roster
Pitchers: 52 Mike Boddicker; 46 Mike Flanagan; 21 Dave Ford; 28 Paul Hartzell; 26 Joe Kerrigan; 30 Dennis Martínez; 23 Tippy Martinez; 16 Scott McGregor; 22 Jim Palmer; 53 Sammy Stewart; 49 Tim Stoddard; 32 Steve Stone	Catchers: 24 Rick Dempsey; 37 Dan Graham; 8 Dave Skaggs; Infielders: 7 Mark Belanger; 2 Bobby Bonner; 10 Terry Crowley; 25 Rich Dauer; 11 Doug DeCinces; 3 Kiko Garcia; 6 Wayne Krenchicki; 14 Lee May; 33 Eddie Murray; 9 Floyd Rayford; 12 Lenn Sakata	Outfielders: 27 Benny Ayala; 1 Al Bumbry; 15 Mark Corey; 41 Drungo Hazewood; 18 Pat Kelly; 38 John Lowenstein; 35 Gary Roenicke; 29 Ken Singleton	Manager: 4 Earl Weaver; Coaches: 44 Elrod Hendricks (Bullpen); 31 Ray Miller (Pitching); 47 Cal Ripken (Third base); 20 Frank Robinson (First base/Hitting)

== Player stats ==
= Indicates team leader

=== Batting ===
==== Starters by position ====
Note: Pos = Position; G = Games played; AB = At bats; H = Hits; Avg. = Batting average; HR = Home runs; RBI = Runs batted in

Pos	Player	G	AB	H	Avg.	HR	RBI
C	Rick Dempsey	119	362	95	.262	9	40
1B	Eddie Murray	158	621	186	.300	32	116
2B	Rich Dauer	152	557	158	.284	2	63
SS	Mark Belanger	113	268	61	.228	0	22
3B	Doug DeCinces	145	489	122	.249	16	64
LF	Gary Roenicke	118	297	71	.239	10	28
CF	Al Bumbry	160	645	205	.318	9	53
RF	Ken Singleton	156	583	177	.304	24	104
DH	Terry Crowley	92	233	67	.288	12	50

==== Other batters ====
Note: G = Games played; AB = At bats; H = Hits; Avg. = Batting average; HR = Home runs; RBI = Runs batted in

Player	G	AB	H	Avg.	HR	RBI
Kiko Garcia	111	311	62	.199	1	27
Dan Graham	86	266	74	.278	15	54
Lee May	78	222	54	.243	7	31
Pat Kelly	89	200	52	.260	3	26
John Lowenstein	104	196	61	.311	4	27
Benny Ayala	76	170	45	.265	10	33
Lenn Sakata	43	83	16	.193	1	9
Mark Corey	36	36	10	.278	1	2
Floyd Rayford	8	18	4	.222	0	1
Wayne Krenchicki	9	14	2	.143	0	0
Drungo Hazewood	6	5	0	.000	0	0
Dave Skaggs	2	5	1	.200	0	0
Bobby Bonner	4	4	0	.000	0	1

=== Pitching ===
= Indicates league leader

==== Starting pitchers ====
Note: G = Games pitched; IP = Innings pitched; W = Wins; L = Losses; ERA = Earned run average; SO = Strikeouts

Player	G	IP	W	L	ERA	SO
Scott McGregor	36	252.0	20	8	3.32	119
Mike Flanagan	37	251.1	16	13	4.12	128
Steve Stone	37	250.2	25	7	3.23	149
Jim Palmer	34	224.0	16	10	3.98	109
Mike Boddicker	1	7.1	0	1	6.14	4

==== Other pitchers ====
Note: G = Games pitched; IP = Innings pitched; W = Wins; L = Losses; ERA = Earned run average; SO = Strikeouts

Player	G	IP	W	L	ERA	SO
Dennis Martínez	25	99.2	6	4	3.97	42

==== Relief pitchers ====
Note: G = Games pitched; W = Wins; L = Losses; SV = Saves; ERA = Earned run average; SO = Strikeouts

Player	G	W	L	SV	ERA	SO
Tim Stoddard	64	5	3	26	2.51	64
Tippy Martinez	53	4	4	10	3.01	68
Sammy Stewart	33	7	7	3	3.56	78
Dave Ford	25	1	3	1	4.26	22
Paul Hartzell	6	0	2	0	6.62	5
Joe Kerrigan	1	0	0	0	3.86	1

== Farm system ==
Level	Team	League	Manager
AAA	Rochester Red Wings	International League	Doc Edwards
AA	Charlotte O's	Southern League	Jimmy Williams
A	Miami Orioles	Florida State League	Lance Nichols
Rookie	Bluefield Orioles	Appalachian League	Grady Little

LEAGUE CHAMPIONS: Charlotte
