= 1979 Baltimore Orioles season =

Major League Baseball season

1979 Baltimore Orioles
- American League champions American League East champions
- League: American League
- Division: East
- Ballpark: Memorial Stadium
- City: Baltimore, Maryland
- Record: 102–57 (.642)
- Divisional place: 1st
- Owners: Jerold Hoffberger, Edward Bennett Williams
- General managers: Hank Peters
- Managers: Earl Weaver
- Television: WMAR-TV
- Radio: WFBR (Chuck Thompson, Bill O'Donnell, Tom Marr, and on few occasions Charley Eckman)

The 1979 Baltimore Orioles season was the 79th season in Baltimore Orioles franchise history, the 26th in Baltimore, and 26th at Memorial Stadium. The Orioles finished first in the American League East division of Major League Baseball with a record of 102 wins and 57 losses. They went on to defeat the California Angels in the 1979 American League Championship Series, 3 games to 1, before losing the 1979 World Series to the Pittsburgh Pirates, 4 games to 3.

== Season overview ==
The 1979 season represented a turning point in Orioles history. Attendance of games was poor in 1978, but ownership changed hands in 1979, with a 12-million-dollar sale by Jerry Hoffberger's Baltimore Baseball Group, a local, family-oriented operation, to Edward Bennett Williams, a Washington, D.C. attorney with ideas to move the club to the nation's capital.

During the season, the club played well, winning 102 games and the American League East title for the first time since 1974. Additionally, Earl Weaver used 140 different lineups during the regular season.

The cause of the rise in popularity during the 1979 season is still unknown. Some suspect that a cause could be linked to the NFL's Baltimore Colts coming apart under Robert Irsay. With the team losing and Irsay threatening to relocate, people may have been looking for an alternative. Another factor was a change in the Orioles' flagship radio station: After 22 years on WBAL, the games were now on WFBR, a smaller station, but with a younger audience.

== Offseason ==
- December 4, 1978: Jeff Schneider was drafted by the Orioles from the Philadelphia Phillies in the 1978 rule 5 draft.
- December 21, 1978: Steve Lake was purchased from the Orioles by the Milwaukee Brewers.
- January 16, 1979: Mike Dimmel was traded by the Orioles to the St. Louis Cardinals for Benny Ayala.
- March 26, 1979: Elrod Hendricks was released by the Orioles.

== Regular season ==
=== A new owner ===
The team won 90 games and drew 1.05 million fans in 1978, maintaining an attendance level that hadn't changed in 25 years. Hoffberger was under pressure to sell the team due to player salaries rising and profits falling. He announced in 1978 that he would entertain offers. Williams' purchase was completed in August of 1979. The lawyer said he would move to Washington if attendance continued to disappoint, although the draw was up well before Williams issued his warning.

=== The players ===
The Orioles didn't have a high payroll, but won with a lot of effort and the individual skills that team members had to offer. An amalgam of All-Stars and role players jelling under Weaver, they pitched well, made key plays, hit in the clutch, came from behind, and won games in unusual ways. The phenomenon was given a nickname: "Oriole Magic".

==== Offense ====
Those carrying the heaviest loads on offense were outfielder Ken Singleton, who had a career year with 35 homers and 111 RBIs and finished second in the American League MVP voting, and first baseman Eddie Murray, who had 25 homers and 99 RBIs.

Rich Dauer, Kiko Garcia, and Doug DeCinces filled out the infield, with Garcia taking over for aging Mark Belanger at shortstop. Al Bumbry batted leadoff, stole 37 bases, and ran down balls in center field. Rick Dempsey hit .239, but his get-dirty style behind the plate made him a fan favorite.

Weaver's platoon of veteran John Lowenstein and rookie Gary Roenicke in left field was also successful. Roenicke, acquired from Montreal, had 25 homers and 64 RBIs, while Lowenstein, released by Texas Rangers after the 1978 season, added 11 homers and 34 RBIs.

Weaver also found places to plug in reserve outfielder Pat Kelly, who batted .288; pinch hitter Terry Crowley, who batted .317, and Benny Ayala, a reserve outfielder with a knack for extra-base hits. Lee May received the majority of the designated hitter at-bats, producing 19 homers and 69 RBIs.

==== Pitching ====
Pitching was still the heart of the club. The Orioles had the AL's lowest team ERA (3.28, more than a half-run lower than the next best team) and limited opponents to a .241 average, the league's lowest by 12 points. The staff was led by Mike Flanagan, whose 23–9 record, 3.08 ERA, and 16 complete games earned him the AL Cy Young Award. After Flanagan, there was Dennis Martínez (15–16, 18 complete games), Scott McGregor (13–6), Steve Stone (11–7), and Jim Palmer (10–6), who was injured and failed to win 20 games for only the second time in the 1970s. The bullpen, with Don Stanhouse, left-hander Tippy Martinez, and right-handers Tim Stoddard and Sammy Stewart, had 28 wins and 30 saves.

Stanhouse, a closer acquired in a six-player deal with the Montreal Expos, made the All-Star team. Weaver called Stanhouse "Full Pack", as in the full pack of cigarettes Weaver smoked to get through Stanhouse's appearances.

=== "Wild Bill" ===
In section 34 in the upper deck down the right-field line, a bearded cab driver named "Wild" Bill Hagy became a symbol for the team and fellow attendees of the games. He would rise from his seat, stand in front of his section, and spell out O-R-I-O-L-E-S with his body, twisting his arms and legs into recognizable facsimiles of the letters. When other, nearby sections joined in the cheer, it grew in popularity until the entire ballpark followed Hagy's lead, sending roaring cheers into the night.

=== Season standings ===
AL East
Team	W	L	Pct.	GB	Home	Road
Baltimore Orioles	102	57	.642	—	55‍–‍24	47‍–‍33
Milwaukee Brewers	95	66	.590	8	52‍–‍29	43‍–‍37
Boston Red Sox	91	69	.569	11½	51‍–‍29	40‍–‍40
New York Yankees	89	71	.556	13½	51‍–‍30	38‍–‍41
Detroit Tigers	85	76	.528	18	46‍–‍34	39‍–‍42
Cleveland Indians	81	80	.503	22	47‍–‍34	34‍–‍46
Toronto Blue Jays	53	109	.327	50½	32‍–‍49	21‍–‍60

=== Record vs. opponents ===
1979 American League record Sources:
Team	BAL	BOS	CAL	CWS	CLE	DET	KC	MIL	MIN	NYY	OAK	SEA	TEX	TOR
Baltimore	—	8–5	9–3	8–3	8–5	7–6	6–6	8–5	8–4	5–6	8–4	10–2	6–6	11–2
Boston	5–8	—	5–7	5–6	6–7	8–5	8–4	8–4	9–3	5–8	9–3	8–4	6–6	9–4
California	3–9	7–5	—	9–4	6–6	4–8	7–6	7–5	9–4	7–5	10–3	7–6	5–8	7–5
Chicago	3–8	6–5	4–9	—	6–6	3–9	5–8	5–7	5–8	4–8	9–4	5–8	11–2	7–5
Cleveland	5–8	7–6	6–6	6–6	—	6–6	6–6	4–9	8–4	5–8	8–4	7–5	5–7	8–5
Detroit	6–7	5–8	8–4	9–3	6–6	—	5–7	6–7	4–8	7–6	7–5	7–5	6–6	9–4
Kansas City	6–6	4–8	6–7	8–5	6–6	7–5	—	5–7	7–6	5–7	9–4	7–6	6–7	9–3
Milwaukee	5–8	4–8	5–7	7–5	9–4	7–6	7–5	—	8–4	9–4	6–6	9–3	9–3	10–3
Minnesota	4–8	3–9	4–9	8–5	4–8	8–4	6–7	4–8	—	7–5	9–4	10–3	4–9	11–1
New York	6–5	8–5	5–7	8–4	8–5	6–7	7–5	4–9	5–7	—	9–3	6–6	8–4	9–4
Oakland	4–8	3–9	3–10	4–9	4–8	5–7	4–9	6–6	4–9	3–9	—	8–5	2–11	4–8
Seattle	2–10	4–8	6–7	8–5	5–7	5–7	6–7	3–9	3–10	6–6	5–8	—	6–7	8–4
Texas	6–6	6–6	8–5	2–11	7–5	6–6	7–6	3–9	9–4	4–8	11–2	7–6	—	7–5
Toronto	2–11	4–9	5–7	5–7	5–8	4–9	3–9	3–10	1–11	4–9	8–4	4–8	5–7	—

=== Notable transactions ===
- June 26, 1979: John Stefero was signed by the Orioles as an amateur free agent.
- September 1, 1979: Elrod Hendricks was signed as a free agent by the Orioles.

=== Roster ===
1979 Baltimore Orioles
Roster
Pitchers: 46 Mike Flanagan; 37 John Flinn; 59 Dave Ford; 30 Dennis Martínez; 23 Tippy Martinez; 16 Scott McGregor; 22 Jim Palmer; 43 Jeff Rineer; 26 Don Stanhouse; 53 Sammy Stewart; 49 Tim Stoddard; 21,32 Steve Stone	Catchers: 24 Rick Dempsey; 44 Elrod Hendricks; 8 Dave Skaggs; Infielders: 7 Mark Belanger; 45 Tom Chism; 10 Terry Crowley; 25 Rich Dauer; 11 Doug DeCinces; 3 Kiko Garcia; 12 Wayne Krenchicki; 14 Lee May; 33 Eddie Murray; 2 Billy Smith	Outfielders: 27 Benny Ayala; 1 Al Bumbry; 15 Mark Corey; 6 Larry Harlow; 18 Pat Kelly; 38 John Lowenstein; 9 Bob Molinaro; 35 Gary Roenicke; 29 Ken Singleton	Manager: 4 Earl Weaver; Coaches: 41 Jim Frey (First base); 44 Elrod Hendricks (Bullpen); 31 Ray Miller (Pitching); 47 Cal Ripken (Third base); 20 Frank Robinson (Hitting)

== Player stats ==
= Indicates team leader

=== Batting ===
==== Starters by position ====
Note: Pos = Position; G = Games played; AB = At bats; H = Hits; Avg. = Batting average; HR = Home runs; RBI = Runs batted in

Pos	Player	G	AB	H	Avg.	HR	RBI
C	Rick Dempsey	124	368	88	.239	6	41
1B	Eddie Murray	159	606	179	.295	25	99
2B	Rich Dauer	142	479	123	.257	9	61
3B	Doug DeCinces	120	422	97	.230	16	61
SS	Kiko Garcia	126	417	103	.247	5	24
LF	Gary Roenicke	133	376	98	.261	25	64
CF	Al Bumbry	148	569	162	.285	7	49
RF	Ken Singleton	159	570	168	.295	35	111
DH	Lee May	124	456	116	.254	19	69

==== Other batters ====
Note: G = Games played; AB = At bats; H = Hits; Avg. = Batting average; HR = Home runs; RBI = Runs batted in

Player	G	AB	H	Avg.	HR	RBI
Mark Belanger	101	198	33	.167	0	9
John Lowenstein	97	197	50	.254	11	34
Billy Smith	68	189	47	.249	6	33
Pat Kelly	68	153	44	.288	9	25
Dave Skaggs	63	137	34	.248	1	14
Benny Ayala	42	86	22	.256	6	13
Terry Crowley	61	63	20	.317	1	8
Larry Harlow	38	41	11	.268	0	1
Wayne Krenchicki	16	21	4	.190	0	0
Mark Corey	13	13	2	.154	0	1
Bob Molinaro	8	6	0	.000	0	0
Tom Chism	6	3	0	.000	0	0
Elrod Hendricks	1	1	0	.000	0	0

=== Pitching ===
= Indicates league leader

==== Starting pitchers ====
Note: G = Games pitched; IP = Innings pitched; W = Wins; L = Losses; ERA = Earned run average; SO = Strikeouts

Player	G	IP	W	L	ERA	SO
Dennis Martínez	40	292.1	15	16	3.66	132
Mike Flanagan	39	265.2	23	9	3.08	190
Steve Stone	32	186.0	11	7	3.77	96
Scott McGregor	27	174.2	13	6	3.35	81
Jim Palmer	23	155.2	10	6	3.30	67

==== Other pitchers ====
Note: G = Games pitched; IP = Innings pitched; W = Wins; L = Losses; ERA = Earned run average; SO = Strikeouts

Player	G	IP	W	L	ERA	SO
Dave Ford	9	30.0	2	1	2.10	7

==== Relief pitchers ====
Note: G = Games pitched; W = Wins; L = Losses; SV = Saves; ERA = Earned run average; SO = Strikeouts

Player	G	IP	W	L	SV	ERA	SO
Don Stanhouse	52	72.2	7	3	21	2.85	34
Tippy Martinez	39	78.0	10	3	3	2.88	61
Sammy Stewart	31	117.2	8	5	1	3.52	71
Tim Stoddard	29	58.0	3	1	3	1.71	47
John Flinn	4	2.2	0	0	0	0.00	0
Jeff Rineer	1	1.0	0	0	0	0.00	0

== Postseason ==
=== ALCS ===
The Orioles won the Series, 3 games to 1, over the California Angels.

Game	Score	Date	Location	Attendance
1	California – 3, Baltimore – 6	October 3	Memorial Stadium	52,787
2	California – 8, Baltimore – 9	October 4	Memorial Stadium	52,108
3	Baltimore – 3, California – 4	October 5	Anaheim Stadium	43,199
4	Baltimore – 8, California – 0	October 6	Anaheim Stadium	43,199

=== World Series ===
NL Pittsburgh Pirates (4) vs. AL Baltimore Orioles (3)

Game	Score	Date	Location	Attendance	Time of Game
1	Pirates – 4, Orioles – 5	October 10	Memorial Stadium	53,735	3:18
2	Pirates – 3, Orioles – 2	October 11	Memorial Stadium	53,739	3:13
3	Orioles – 8, Pirates – 4	October 12	Three Rivers Stadium	50,848	2:51
4	Orioles – 9, Pirates – 6	October 13	Three Rivers Stadium	50,883	3:48
5	Orioles – 1, Pirates – 7	October 14	Three Rivers Stadium	50,920	2:54
6	Pirates – 4, Orioles – 0	October 16	Memorial Stadium	53,739	2:30
7	Pirates – 4, Orioles – 1	October 17	Memorial Stadium	53,733	2:54

== Awards and honors ==
- Earl Weaver, Associated Press AL Manager of the Year

== Farm system ==
Level	Team	League	Manager
AAA	Rochester Red Wings	International League	Doc Edwards
AA	Charlotte O's	Southern League	Jimmy Williams
A	Miami Orioles	Florida State League	Lance Nichols
Rookie	Bluefield Orioles	Appalachian League	J. R. Miner
