= 1977 Baltimore Orioles season =

Major League Baseball season

1977 Baltimore Orioles
- League: American League
- Division: East
- Ballpark: Memorial Stadium
- City: Baltimore, Maryland
- Record: 97–64 (.602)
- Divisional place: 2nd
- Owners: Jerold Hoffberger
- General managers: Hank Peters
- Managers: Earl Weaver
- Television: WJZ-TV
- Radio: WBAL (AM) (Chuck Thompson, Bill O'Donnell)

The 1977 Baltimore Orioles season was the 77th season in Baltimore Orioles franchise history, the 24th in Baltimore, and the 24th at Memorial Stadium. The Orioles finished tied for second place in the American League East with a record of 97 wins and 64 losses. The Orioles stayed in contention for the division title until an 11–10 loss to the Boston Red Sox at Fenway Park on September 30. They in turn eliminated the Red Sox 8–7 the following day on October 1.

The Orioles entered the campaign with diminished expectations because of the departures of Reggie Jackson, Bobby Grich and Wayne Garland via free agency. The team's biggest boost came from Eddie Murray who hit .283 with 27 home runs and 88 runs batted in (RBI) and was named the American League Rookie of the Year on November 21. He also batted .364 with nine homers and 26 RBI during the last 31 games of the season.

The Orioles lost a five-inning 4–0 decision to the Toronto Blue Jays at Exhibition Stadium on September 15 via forfeit because of third-base umpire Marty Springstead's refusal to have a tarpaulin covering the pitcher's mounds in the home team's bullpen in the left-field corner removed. Out of concern for the safety of his left fielder Andrés Mora, manager Earl Weaver protested Springstead's decision by pulling his team off the field. The forfeit was declared after 15 minutes had elapsed and the Orioles had not returned. Weaver explained, "Mora almost broke his leg on that damn thing yesterday. If that had not happened, I might not have thought of it. If a guy slips out there and hurts his leg, how am I gonna feel?" American League president Lee MacPhail upheld the forfeit two days later on September 17. Even though he said that Weaver's concern for his players' safety was "not only understandable, but commendable", MacPhail stated, "There is a basic principle involved here, and that is that someone involved as a competitor cannot be allowed to dictate decisions that must be made by a neutral official."

The Orioles drew 1,195,769 which at the time was the second-highest home attendance total since the franchise's first season in Baltimore in 1954, surpassed by only 1,203,366 in 1966. A 10–4 defeat to the Red Sox at Memorial Stadium on September 18 drew 51,798, then the largest crowd to attend an Orioles home regular-season game, who paid tribute to Brooks Robinson who had announced his retirement as an active player one month prior on August 21. The ballclub sustained a net operating loss of $43,846, primarily because of a $499,000 increase in player payroll in the first year of Major League Baseball (MLB) free agency.

== Offseason ==
- November 1, 1976: Darryl Cias was released by the Orioles.
- November 5, 1976: 1976 MLB expansion draft
  - Bob Galasso was selected from the Orioles by the Seattle Mariners.
  - Dave Pagan was selected from the Orioles by the Seattle Mariners.
- December 15, 1976: Bob Babcock was traded by the Orioles to the Texas Rangers for Dave Criscione.
- January 11, 1977: John Shelby was drafted by the Orioles in the 1st round (20th pick) of the 1977 Major League Baseball draft.
- January 20, 1977: Paul Blair was traded by the Orioles to the New York Yankees for Elliott Maddox and Rick Bladt.
- February 8, 1977: Billy Smith was signed as a free agent by the Orioles.
- February 11, 1977: Vic Rodriguez was signed as an amateur free agent by the Orioles.

== Regular season ==
Brooks
Robinson
3B
Retired 1977

=== Season standings ===
AL East
Team	W	L	Pct.	GB	Home	Road
New York Yankees	100	62	.617	—	55‍–‍26	45‍–‍36
Baltimore Orioles	97	64	.602	2½	54‍–‍27	43‍–‍37
Boston Red Sox	97	64	.602	2½	51‍–‍29	46‍–‍35
Detroit Tigers	74	88	.457	26	39‍–‍42	35‍–‍46
Cleveland Indians	71	90	.441	28½	37‍–‍44	34‍–‍46
Milwaukee Brewers	67	95	.414	33	37‍–‍44	30‍–‍51
Toronto Blue Jays	54	107	.335	45½	25‍–‍55	29‍–‍52

=== Record vs. opponents ===
1977 American League record Sources:
Team	BAL	BOS	CAL	CWS	CLE	DET	KC	MIL	MIN	NYY	OAK	SEA	TEX	TOR
Baltimore	—	6–8	5–6	5–5	11–4	12–3	4–7	11–4	6–4	8–7	8–2	7–3	4–6	10–5
Boston	8–6	—	7–3	3–7	8–7	9–6	5–5	9–6	4–6	8–7	8–3	10–1	6–4	12–3
California	6–5	3–7	—	8–7	6–4	4–6	6–9	5–5	7–8	4–7	5–10	9–6	5–10	6–4
Chicago	5–5	7–3	7–8	—	6–4	4–6	8–7	6–5	10–5	3–7	10–5	10–5	6–9	8–3
Cleveland	4–11	7–8	4–6	4–6	—	8–7	3–7	11–4	2–9	3–12	7–3	7–3	2–9	9–5
Detroit	3–12	6–9	6–4	6–4	7–8	—	3–8	10–5	5–5	6–9	5–5	5–6	2–8	10–5
Kansas City	7–4	5–5	9–6	7–8	7–3	8–3	—	8–2	10–5	5–5	9–6	11–4	8–7	8–2
Milwaukee	4–11	6–9	5–5	5–6	4–11	5–10	2–8	—	3–8	8–7	5–5	7–3	5–5	8–7
Minnesota	4–6	6–4	8–7	5–10	9–2	5–5	5–10	8–3	—	2–8	8–6	7–8	8–7	9–1
New York	7–8	7–8	7–4	7–3	12–3	9–6	5–5	7–8	8–2	—	9–2	6–4	7–3	9–6
Oakland	2–8	3–8	10–5	5–10	3–7	5–5	6–9	5–5	6–8	2–9	—	7–8	2–13	7–3
Seattle	3–7	1–10	6–9	5–10	3–7	6–5	4–11	3–7	8–7	4–6	8–7	—	9–6	4–6
Texas	6–4	4–6	10–5	9–6	9–2	8–2	7–8	5–5	7–8	3–7	13–2	6–9	—	7–4
Toronto	5–10	3–12	4–6	3–8	5–9	5–10	2–8	7–8	1–9	6–9	3–7	6–4	4–7	—

=== Notable transactions ===
- May 26, 1977: Randy Stein was acquired from the Orioles by the New York Yankees.
- June 13, 1977: Dyar Miller was traded by the Orioles to the California Angels for Dick Drago.
- July 27, 1977: Ken Rudolph was purchased by the Orioles from the San Francisco Giants.
- September 19, 1977: Nelson Briles was purchased by the Orioles from the Texas Rangers.

=== Roster ===
1977 Baltimore Orioles
Roster
Pitchers: 55 Nelson Briles; 45 Tony Chévez; 37 Dick Drago; 17 Ed Farmer; 46 Mike Flanagan; 48 Ross Grimsley; 38 Fred Holdsworth; 30 Dennis Martínez; 23 Tippy Martinez; 43 Rudy May; 39 Scott McGregor; 37 Dyar Miller; 35 Randy Miller; 22 Jim Palmer; 32 Mike Parrott; 52 Earl Stephenson	Catchers: 40 Dave Criscione; 24 Rick Dempsey; 12 Ken Rudolph; 8 Dave Skaggs; Infielders: 7 Mark Belanger; 10 Terry Crowley; 44 Rich Dauer; 11 Doug DeCinces; 3 Kiko Garcia; 14 Lee May; 33 Eddie Murray; 16 Tony Muser; 5 Brooks Robinson; 2 Billy Smith	Outfielders: 1 Al Bumbry; 36 Mike Dimmel; 34 Larry Harlow; 18 Pat Kelly; 21 Elliott Maddox; 27 Andrés Mora; 28 Tom Shopay; 29 Ken Singleton	Manager: 4 Earl Weaver; Coaches: 31 George Bamberger (Pitching); 41 Jim Frey (First base); 55 Billy Hunter (Third base); 47 Cal Ripken (Bullpen/Third base)

== Game log ==
=== Regular season ===
Past games legend
Orioles Win (#bfb)	Orioles Loss (#fbb)	Game postponed (#bbb)	Eliminated from playoff spot (#933)
Bold denotes an Orioles pitcher

1977 regular season game log: 97–64 (Home: 54–27; Away: 43–37)
April: 8–8 (Home: 5–6; Away: 3–2)

#	Date	Time (ET)	Opponent	Score	Win	Loss	Save	Time of Game	Attendance	Record	Box/ Streak
13	April 25	8:40 p.m. EDT	Yankees	6–9	Tidrow (2–1)	**D. Martínez** (0–1)	Lyle (4)	3:06	17,624	7–6	L2
14	April 26	7:31 p.m. EDT	Yankees	6–2	**May** (2–2)	Holtzman (1–1)	—	2:15	12,884	8–6	W1
15	April 27	7:32 p.m. EDT	Yankees	3–4	Lyle (1–1)	**D. Martínez** (0–2)	—	2:51	15,647	8–7	L1

May: 17–10 (Home: 11–3; Away: 6–7)

#	Date	Time (ET)	Opponent	Score	Win	Loss	Save	Time of Game	Attendance	Record	Box/ Streak
31	May 19	8:00 p.m. EDT	@ Yankees	1–9	Figueroa (5–2)	**Flanagan** (1–2)	—	2:09	15,909	17–14	L3
32	May 20	8:00 p.m. EDT	@ Yankees	6–5	**D. Martínez** (2–2)	Tidrow (2–2)	—	3:01	25,872	18–14	W1
33	May 21	2:00 p.m. EDT	@ Yankees	4–3 (12)	**T. Martinez** (1–0)	Lyle (2–2)	—	3:12	19,968	19–14	W2
34 (1)	May 22	1:00 p.m. EDT	@ Yankees	5–1	**May** (5–4)	Hunter (1–3)	—	2:23	—	20–14	W3
35 (2)	May 22	3:48 p.m. EDT	@ Yankees	2–8	Guidry (3–0)	**McGregor** (1–1)	—	2:19	43,285	20–15	L1
38 (1)	May 25	5:34 p.m. EDT	Royals	1–4	Splittorff (3–4)	**Grimsley** (4–3)	Gura (4)	2:23	—	22–16	L1
39 (2)	May 25	8:25 p.m. EDT	Royals	7–2	**D. Martínez** (3–2)	Colburn (5–5)	—	2:56	11,388	23–16	W1

June: 13–18 (Home: 6–8; Away: 7–10)

#	Date	Time (ET)	Opponent	Score	Win	Loss	Save	Time of Game	Attendance	Record	Box/ Streak
47	June 3	8:00 p.m. EDT	@ Royals	7–6	**Grimsley** (6–3)	Bird (2–1)	**T. Martinez** (1)	3:00	21,878	27–20	W1
48 (1)	June 4	6:00 p.m. EDT	@ Royals	5–4	**D. Martínez** (4–2)	**Colburn** (6–6)	—	2:21	—	28–20	W2
49 (2)	June 4	8:56 p.m. EDT	@ Royals	13–14 (10)	**Gura** (3–1)	Flanagan (1–5)	—	3:36	36,931	28–21	L1
50	June 5	2:30 p.m. EDT	@ Royals								

July: 20–8 (Home: 10–3; Away: 10–5)

#	Date	Time (ET)	Opponent	Score	Win	Loss	Save	Time of Game	Attendance	Record	Box/ Streak
83	July 8	7:37 p.m. EDT	Yankees	5–7	Gullett (7–3)	**May** (10–8)	Lyle (14)	2:52	33,738	46–375	L1
84	July 9	7:38 p.m. EDT	Yankees	6–5	**T. Martinez** (2–0)	Lyle (7–3)	**Drago** (4)	2:34	44,193	47–37	W1
85	July 10	2:11 p.m. EDT	Yankees	6–0	**Grimsley** (8–4)	Figueroa (8–7)	—	2:12	34,299	48–37	W2
86	July 11	8:39 p.m. EDT	Yankees	4–3	**Flanagan** (6–8)	Torrez (8–8)	—	2:56	42,603	49–37	W3
ASG	July 19	8:15 p.m. EDT	48th All-Star Game in Bronx, NY; NL @ AL	5–7	–	–	–	2:34	56,683	–	ASG
98	July 26	8:00 p.m. EDT	@ Yankees	4–5 (10)	Lyle (8–3)	**McGregor** (1–2)	—	2:48	32,097	56–42	L1
99	July 27	8:00 p.m. EDT	@ Yankees	6–4	**Palmer** (12–8)	Hunter (6–5)	**T. Martinez** (5)	3:15	47,271	57–42	W1
100	July 28	2:00 p.m. EDT	@ Yankees	2–14	Torrez (9–10)	**May** (11–9)	—	2:40	40,818	57–43	L1

August: 16–11 (Home: 12–5; Away: 4–6)

#	Date	Time (ET)	Opponent	Score	Win	Loss	Save	Time of Game	Attendance	Record	Box/ Streak
121	August 22	8:30 p.m. EDT	@ Royals								
122	August 23	8:30 p.m. EDT	@ Royals								
125	August 26	7:38 p.m. EDT	Royals								
126	August 27	7:33 p.m. EDT	Royals								
127	August 28	2:08 p.m. EDT	Royals								

September: 21–9 (Home: 11–2; Away: 10–7)

#	Date	Time (ET)	Opponent	Score	Win	Loss	Save	Time of Game	Attendance	Record	Box/ Streak

October: 1–0 (Home: 0–0; Away: 1–0)

#	Date	Time (ET)	Opponent	Score	Win	Loss	Save	Time of Game	Attendance	Record	Box/ Streak

=== Detailed records ===
American League
Opponent	Home	Away	Total	Pct.	Runs scored	Runs allowed
AL East
**Baltimore Orioles**	—	—	—	—	—	—
New York Yankees	4–4	4–3	8–7	0.533	66	79
Div Total	4–4	4–3	8–7	0.533	66	79
AL West
Kansas City Royals	2–4	2–3	4–7	0.364	51	57
Div Total	2–4	2–3	4–7	0.364	51	57
Season Total	6–8	6–6	12–14	0.462	117	136

Month	Games	Won	Lost	Win %	RS	RA
Total

	Games	Won	Lost	Win %	RS	RA
Home
Away
Total

=== Composite Box ===
1977 Baltimore Orioles Inning–by–Inning Boxscore
Team	1	2	3	4	5	6	7	8	9	10	11	12	13	14	15	R	H	E
Opponents
Orioles

== Starting Lineups ==
=== Regular Season ===
==== Batting Order ====
1977 Regular Season Batting Order game log
April

#	Date	Opponent	1st	2nd	3rd	4th	5th	6th	7th	8th	9th
13	April 25	NYY	#1; Bumbry (LF)	#2; Smith (2B)	#29; Singleton (RF)	#11; DeCinces (3B)	#33; Murray (DH)	#14; May (1B)	#24; Dempsey (C)	#34; Harlow (CF)	#7; Belanger (SS)
14	April 26	NYY									
15	April 27	NYY									

May

#	Date	Opponent	1st	2nd	3rd	4th	5th	6th	7th	8th	9th
31	May 19	@ NYY									
32	May 20	@ NYY									
33	May 21	@ NYY									
34	May 22	@ NYY									
35	May 22	@ NYY									

June

#	Date	Opponent	1st	2nd	3rd	4th	5th	6th	7th	8th	9th

July

#	Date	Opponent	1st	2nd	3rd	4th	5th	6th	7th	8th	9th
83	July 8	NYY									
84	July 9	NYY									
85	July 10	NYY									
86	July 11	NYY									
98	July 26	@ NYY									
99	July 27	@ NYY									
100	July 28	@ NYY									

August

#	Date	Opponent	1st	2nd	3rd	4th	5th	6th	7th	8th	9th

September

#	Date	Opponent	1st	2nd	3rd	4th	5th	6th	7th	8th	9th

October

#	Date	Opponent	1st	2nd	3rd	4th	5th	6th	7th	8th	9th

==== Defensive Lineup ====
1977 Regular Season Defensive Lineup game log
April

#	Date	Opponent	C	1B	2B	3B	SS	LF	CF	RF	P
13	April 25	NYY	#24; Dempsey	#14; May	#2; Smith	#11; DeCinces	#7; Belanger	#1; Bumbry	#34; Harlow	#29; Singleton	#48; Grimsley
14	April 26	NYY									#43; May
15	April 27	NYY									#39; McGregor

May

#	Date	Opponent	C	1B	2B	3B	SS	LF	CF	RF	P
31	May 19	@ NYY									
32	May 20	@ NYY									
33	May 21	@ NYY									#48; Grimsley
34	May 22	@ NYY									#43; May
35	May 22	@ NYY									#39; McGregor

June

#	Date	Opponent	C	1B	2B	3B	SS	LF	CF	RF	P

July

#	Date	Opponent	C	1B	2B	3B	SS	LF	CF	RF	P
83	July 8	NYY									#43; May
84	July 9	NYY									
85	July 10	NYY									#48; Grimsley
86	July 11	NYY									
98	July 26	@ NYY									#48; Grimsley
99	July 27	@ NYY									
100	July 28	@ NYY									#43; May

August

#	Date	Opponent	C	1B	2B	3B	SS	LF	CF	RF	P

September

#	Date	Opponent	C	1B	2B	3B	SS	LF	CF	RF	P

October

#	Date	Opponent	C	1B	2B	3B	SS	LF	CF	RF	P

== Game Umpires ==
=== Regular Season ===
1977 Regular Season Umpire game log
April

#	Date	Opponent	HP	1B	2B	3B
13	April 25	NYY	Lou DiMuro (crew chief)	Bill Deegan	Jim McKean	Dale Ford
14	April 26	NYY	Bill Deegan	Jim McKean	Dale Ford	Lou DiMuro (crew chief)
15	April 27	NYY	Jim McKean	Dale Ford	Lou DiMuro (crew chief)	Bill Deegan

May

#	Date	Opponent	HP	1B	2B	3B
31	May 19	@ NYY	Russ Goetz (crew chief)	George Maloney	Terry Cooney	Greg Kosc
32	May 20	@ NYY	George Maloney	Terry Cooney	Greg Kosc	Russ Goetz (crew chief)
33	May 21	@ NYY	Terry Cooney	Greg Kosc	Russ Goetz (crew chief)	George Maloney
34	May 22	@ NYY	Greg Kosc	Russ Goetz (crew chief)	George Maloney	Terry Cooney
35	May 22	@ NYY	Russ Goetz (crew chief)	George Maloney	Terry Cooney	Greg Kosc

June

#	Date	Opponent	HP	1B	2B	3B

July

#	Date	Opponent	HP	1B	2B	3B
83	July 8	NYY	Russ Goetz (crew chief)	George Maloney	Terry Cooney	Greg Kosc
84	July 9	NYY	George Maloney	Terry Cooney	Greg Kosc	Russ Goetz (crew chief)
85	July 10	NYY	Terry Cooney	Greg Kosc	Russ Goetz (crew chief)	George Maloney
86	July 11	NYY	Greg Kosc	Russ Goetz (crew chief)	George Maloney	Jim McKean
98	July 26	@ NYY	Ted Hendry	Jerry Neudecker (crew chief)	Art Frantz	Al Clark
99	July 27	@ NYY	Jerry Neudecker (crew chief)|	Art Frantz	Al Clark	Ted Hendry
100	July 28	@ NYY	Art Frantz	Al Clark	Ted Hendry	Jerry Neudecker (crew chief)

August

#	Date	Opponent	HP	1B	2B	3B

September

#	Date	Opponent	HP	1B	2B	3B

October

#	Date	Opponent	HP	1B	2B	3B

== Player stats ==
=== Batting ===
==== Starters by position ====
Note: Pos = Position; G = Games played; AB = At bats; H = Hits; Avg. = Batting average; HR = Home runs; RBI = Runs batted in

Pos	Player	G	AB	H	Avg.	HR	RBI
C	Rick Dempsey	91	270	61	.226	3	34
1B	Lee May	150	585	148	.253	27	99
2B	Billy Smith	109	367	79	.215	5	29
3B	Doug DeCinces	150	522	135	.259	19	69
SS	Mark Belanger	144	402	83	.206	2	30
LF	Pat Kelly	120	360	92	.256	10	49
CF	Al Bumbry	133	518	164	.317	4	41
RF	Ken Singleton	152	536	176	.328	24	99
DH	Eddie Murray	160	611	173	.283	27	88

==== Other batters ====
Note: G = Games played; AB = At bats; H = Hits; Avg. = Batting average; HR = Home runs; RBI = Runs batted in

Player	G	AB	H	Avg.	HR	RBI
Rich Dauer	96	304	74	.243	5	25
Andrés Mora	77	233	57	.245	13	44
Dave Skaggs	80	216	62	.287	1	24
Kiko Garcia	65	131	29	.221	2	10
Tony Muser	120	118	27	.229	0	7
Elliott Maddox	49	107	28	.262	2	9
Tom Shopay	67	69	13	.188	1	4
Larry Harlow	46	48	10	.208	0	0
Brooks Robinson	24	47	7	.149	1	4
Terry Crowley	18	22	8	.364	1	9
Ken Rudolph	11	14	4	.286	0	2
Dave Criscione	7	9	3	.333	1	1
Mike Dimmel	25	5	0	.000	0	0

=== Pitching ===
==== Starting pitchers ====
Note: G = Games pitched; IP = Innings pitched; W = Wins; L = Losses; ERA = Earned run average; SO = Strikeouts

Player	G	IP	W	L	ERA	SO
Jim Palmer	39	319.0	20	11	2.91	193
Rudy May	37	251.2	18	14	3.61	105
Mike Flanagan	36	235.0	15	10	3.64	149
Ross Grimsley	34	218.1	14	10	3.96	53

==== Other pitchers ====
Note: G = Games pitched; IP = Innings pitched; W = Wins; L = Losses; ERA = Earned run average; SO = Strikeouts

Player	G	IP	W	L	ERA	SO
Dennis Martínez	42	166.2	14	7	4.10	107
Scott McGregor	29	114.0	3	5	4.42	55

==== Relief pitchers ====
Note: G = Games pitched; W = Wins; L = Losses; SV = Saves; ERA = Earned run average; SO = Strikeouts

Player	G	W	L	SV	ERA	SO
Tippy Martinez	41	5	1	9	2.70	29
Dick Drago	36	6	3	3	3.63	20
Dyar Miller	12	2	2	1	5.64	9
Fred Holdsworth	12	0	1	0	6.28	4
Tony Chévez	4	0	0	0	12.38	7
Mike Parrott	3	0	0	0	2.08	2
Nelson Briles	2	0	0	1	6.75	2
Earl Stephenson	1	0	0	0	9.00	2
Randy Miller	1	0	0	0	40.50	0
Ed Farmer	1	0	0	0	inf	0

== Awards and honors ==
- Earl Weaver, Associated Press AL Manager of the Year

== Farm system ==
Level	Team	League	Manager
AAA	Rochester Red Wings	International League	Ken Boyer
AA	Charlotte O's	Southern League	Jimmie Schaffer
A	Miami Orioles	Florida State League	Len Johnston
Rookie	Bluefield Orioles	Appalachian League	J. R. Miner
