= Dave Criscione =

American baseball player (born 1951)

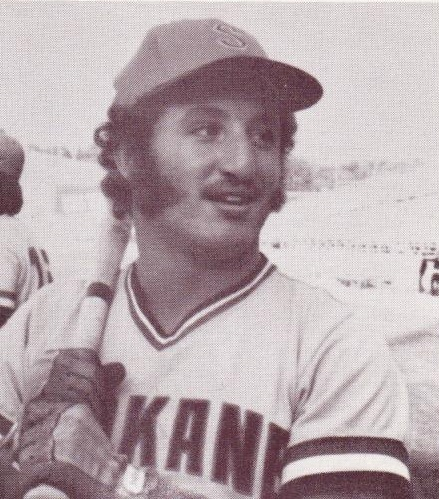
- Catcher
- Born: September 2, 1951 (age 74); Dunkirk, New York, U.S.
- Batted: Right Threw: Right

MLB debut
- July 17, 1977, for the Baltimore Orioles

Last MLB appearance
- July 31, 1977, for the Baltimore Orioles

MLB statistics
- Batting average: .333
- Home runs: 1
- Runs batted in: 1
- Stats at Baseball Reference

Teams
- Baltimore Orioles (1977)

David Gerald Criscione (born September 2, 1951) is an American former Major League Baseball catcher. He played seven games for the Baltimore Orioles in 1977, going 3-for-9 at the plate.

Criscione hit just one major league home run, but it was a walk-off home run against the Milwaukee Brewers on July 25, 1977. After Andrés Mora pinch-hit for starting catcher Dave Skaggs in the bottom of the 9th inning, Billy Smith tied the game at 3-3 with a single. In the top of the 10th, Criscione entered the game on defense. With the score still tied 3-3 in the bottom of the 11th, Criscione came to bat against Sam Hinds of the Brewers with one out and homered to win the game. Criscione later went on to be a long-time coach of the SUNY Fredonia Blue Devils, a Division III college baseball team near Buffalo, New York.
