= Larry Harlow =

Larry Harlow may refer to:

- Larry Harlow (baseball) (born 1951), retired baseball player
- Larry Harlow (musician) (1939–2021), American salsa music performer, composer and producer
