= Kiko Garcia =

American baseball player (born 1953)

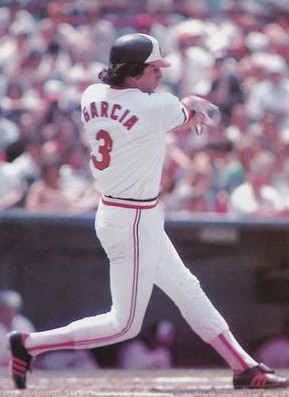
- Garcia at bat in 1977
- Shortstop
- Born: October 14, 1953 (age 73); Martinez, California, U.S.
- Batted: Right Threw: Right

MLB debut
- September 11, 1976, for the Baltimore Orioles

Last MLB appearance
- May 5, 1985, for the Philadelphia Phillies

MLB statistics
- Batting average: .239
- Home runs: 12
- Runs batted in: 112
- Stats at Baseball Reference

Teams
- Baltimore Orioles (1976–1980); Houston Astros (1981–1982); Philadelphia Phillies (1983–1985)

Alfonso Rafael Garcia (born October 14, 1953) is an American former Major League Baseball infielder of Mexican-American descent. He was nicknamed "Kiko" by his grandmother when he was a small boy. He now coaches the 18u NorCal Choppers fast pitch softball team.

== Early years ==
Garcia played football and baseball at Ygnacio Valley High School in Concord, California. He was drafted by the Baltimore Orioles in the third round of the 1971 Major League Baseball draft. He was just seventeen years old when he made his professional baseball debut with the Bluefield Orioles in 1971. He was primarily a shortstop, but the Orioles experimented with him at second base with the Rochester Red Wings in 1975. That idea was quickly abandoned, and he returned to short in 1976. Over six seasons in the Orioles' farm system, Garcia batted .261 with twenty home runs and 229 runs batted in.

== Baltimore Orioles ==
Garcia received a September call up in 1976. He made his major league debut in the first game of a September 11 doubleheader with the Milwaukee Brewers. He got his first major league hit off Jim Colborn in the second game, and came around to score on a Rick Dempsey base hit. On September 22, he hit his first major league home run off the New York Yankees' Grant Jackson.

He spent the entire 1977 season in the majors backing up perennial Gold Glove shortstop Mark Belanger. On April 24, he went 4-for-4 and scored the Orioles' only run in a 2-1 loss to the Detroit Tigers. In 65 games, he batted .221 with two home runs and ten RBIs.

His playing time went up slightly in 1978 (79 games), but his fielding prevented him from supplanting Belanger at short. On May 11, his ninth inning error allowed the deciding run to score in the Boston Red Sox 5-4 victory over the Orioles. Belanger would commit just nine errors all season. Garcia committed sixteen in 538.2 fewer innings.

Doug DeCinces missed 33 games early in the 1979 season with back pain. Second baseman Rich Dauer shifted to third, and Garcia began seeing more action at second. Once DeCinces returned, Belanger suffered an ankle injury that kept him out of the lineup for a month. Filling in for DeCinces and Belanger, Garcia batted .262 with four home runs and five triples in 64 games. The Orioles went 43-21 over the span to take a three game lead in the American League East. For the season, he played a career high 126 games, and had career highs in at bats (417), hits (103), doubles (15), triples (9) and home runs (5). The Orioles, meanwhile, won 102 games, and won the division by eight games over the Milwaukee Brewers.

== 1979 World Series ==
Just as game one of the 1979 American League Championship Series against the California Angels was set to begin, Garcia's brother, John, was arrested. He was found in possession of hashish after he was caught trying to scalp tickets to the game. Garcia sat out game one, but starred in game two. He had an RBI single and scored on Eddie Murray's home run in the second inning, then drove in DeCinces in the third. Overall, he went 3-for-11 with the two RBIs in the ALCS.

Garcia had just one at bat in the first two games of the 1979 World Series, and struck out in the ninth against Pittsburgh Pirates closer Kent Tekulve.

Garcia led off game three of the World Series with a double. In the third, he walked, and scored on Benny Ayala's home run. In the fourth, Garcia came to the plate with the bases loaded. He lined John Candelaria's pitch into right center field for a bases-clearing triple to give the O's a 5-3 lead. He then scored their sixth run on a Ken Singleton single. He would also single in the fifth and had an RBI single in the seventh. He fell a home run shy of the cycle, but he was 4-for-4 with four RBIs and two runs scored in the Orioles' 8-4 victory.

In game four, with the Orioles trailing 4-0, Garcia's third inning double off Jim Bibby brought in two. He scored on Singleton's double to cut the deficit to one. The Orioles were trailing 6-3 when he led off the eighth inning rally with a single. He would score, as did five of his teammates to take a 9-6 lead. All told, Garcia batted .400 with six RBIs and four runs scored in his only World Series.

== Houston Astros ==
Garcia platooned with Belanger at short and occasionally filled in for Dauer at second in 1980, but was hampered by back pain all season. It limited him to one home run, 27 RBIs and a .199 batting average. Just as the 1981 season was set to begin, he was traded to the Houston Astros for Outfielder Chris Bourjos.

Garcia saw some action at second base in early May, but he spent most of the season pinch hitting or backing up Craig Reynolds at short. In the first half of the strike shortened season, Garcia batted .233 with five RBIs. He turned it on in the second half. On August 29, he had a three RBI game against the Philadelphia Phillies. In the second half, Garcia batted .317 with ten RBIs. Meanwhile, the Astros went 33-20 to head to the 1981 National League Division Series against the Los Angeles Dodgers. Garcia went 0-for-4 in his return to the post season.

Garcia saw a decent amount of playing time early in the 1982 season, but his bad back began hampering him more and more as the season wore on. He appeared in just eight games after the All-Star break.

== Philadelphia Phillies ==
The following Spring, Garcia signed a minor league deal with the Phillies. He began the season in the Pacific Coast League with the Portland Beavers, where he batted .345 in 35 games. The hot hitting continued when he came up to the majors, as he was batting .341 at the All-Star break. His batting average cooled down to .288 by season's end. He backed up all three infield positions, and actually saw more playing time as Joe Morgan's back up at second base than he did at short (52 games vs. 22).

The Phillies took Garcia to the post season for the third time in his career, but he did not appear in the 1983 National League Championship Series or the 1983 World Series against his former teammates in Baltimore.

With rookie prospect Juan Samuel at second base for 1984, Garcia's playing time backing up veterans was substantially cut into. He made it into just 57 games, where he batted .233. He appeared in four games for the Phillies in 1985 before he was released on May 17.

== Career statistics ==
Games	PA	AB	Runs	Hits	2B	3B	HR	RBI	SB	BB	SO	Avg.	OBP	OPS	Fld%	WAR
619	1595	1470	162	351	56	16	12	112	34	95	285	.239	.286	.609	.960	4.9

In the late 1980s, Garcia operated a batting cage business named Cagey Hitter in Pleasanton, California, on the grounds of the Alameda County Fairgrounds. He is the president of the KG Hitters girls fastpitch organization in Northern California, while also serving as a manager and coach.
