= Tony Chévez =

Nicaraguan baseball player (born 1953)

- Pitcher
- Born: June 20, 1953 (age 72); Telica, León, Nicaragua
- Batted: Right Threw: Right

MLB debut
- May 31, 1977, for the Baltimore Orioles

Last MLB appearance
- June 8, 1977, for the Baltimore Orioles

MLB statistics
- Win–loss record: 0–0
- Earned run average: 12.38
- Innings pitched: 8

Teams
- Baltimore Orioles (1977)
Medals
Men's baseball
Representing Nicaragua
Baseball World Cup
Silver medal – second place	1973 Central America	Team
Bronze medal – third place	1972 Managua	Team

Silvio Antonio Aguilera Chévez (born June 20, 1953) is a Nicaraguan former professional baseball pitcher. He played in Major League Baseball for the Baltimore Orioles during the 1977 season. Listed at 5' 11" (1.80 m), 177 lb. (80 k), Chévez batted and threw right-handed.

Chévez became the second Nicaraguan player in the big leagues, as he was signed together with El Presidente Dennis Martínez by Baltimore in 1973. Yet after a promising career in his country and the Orioles Minor League system, Chévez hurt his shoulder in his fourth Major League appearance and was never the same.

Chévez first represented Nicaragua in an international competition at the Torneo de la Amistad (Friendship Tournament), held in Managua in 1971, and was also on the national team at the 1971 Pan American Games in Cali, Colombia. After that, he pitched in the 1972 Amateur World Series held in Managua, where the Nicaraguan team won the bronze medal with a 13–2 record. At the 1973 Amateur World Series, held in Managua by FEMBA, he took a no-hitter against Guatemala into the ninth inning, as Nicaragua earned a second place finish behind the United States.

Besides, Chévez posted a 54–44 record with a 3.15 ERA in 181 minor league games from 1974 through 1979, striking out 432 batters while walking 245 in 838 innings of work.

In between, Chévez played winter ball with the Indios de Mayagüez of Puerto Rico and for the Tiburones de La Guaira in Venezuela.

Chévez is a long time resident of Rochester, New York, but he and his family have never forgotten their homeland. In 2003, Chévez and his wife Halyma returned to Telica with a small group of friends from their church, in order to build homes for the neediest people. Since then, they have returned periodically with growing support, including donations of medicine and clothing, along with Bible school and supporting baseball instruction for youths aged 13–15.
