= Telica =

- Municipality
- Location in Nicaragua
- Coordinates: 12°31′N 86°51′W
- Country: Nicaragua
- Department: León

Area
  - Municipality: 152.00 sq mi (393.67 km^{2})

Population (2022 estimate)
  - Municipality: 26,339
  - Density: 173.29/sq mi (66.906/km^{2})
  - Urban: 10,013

Telica is a municipality in the León department of Nicaragua. It is located just north of the city of León. Telica volcano, which is among Nicaragua's most active volcanoes, is located within Telica municipality. The population of the municipality is 26,339.

It is the birthplace of former Major League Baseball player Tony Chévez.
