= Tom Chism =

American baseball player (born 1954)

- First baseman
- Born: May 9, 1954 (age 72); Chester, Pennsylvania
- Batted: Left Threw: Left

MLB debut
- September 13, 1979, for the Baltimore Orioles

Last MLB appearance
- September 26, 1979, for the Baltimore Orioles

MLB statistics
- Batting average: .000
- Games: 6
- Plate appearances: 3
- Stats at Baseball Reference

Teams
- Baltimore Orioles (1979)

Thomas Raymond Chism (born May 9, 1954) is an American former Major League Baseball player from Chester, Pennsylvania.

== Career ==
Drafted by the Baltimore Orioles out of Widener University in 1974, Chism made his Major League debut for the Orioles on September 13, 1979. He would go on to appear in six games mainly as a first baseman.
