= Doug DeCinces =

American baseball player (born 1950)

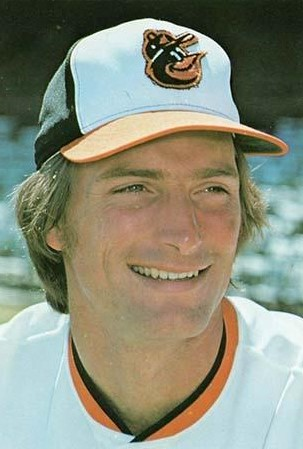
- Third baseman
- Born: August 29, 1950 (age 76); Burbank, California, U.S.
- Batted: Right Threw: Right

Professional debut
- MLB: September 9, 1973, for the Baltimore Orioles
- NPB: April 8, 1988, for the Yakult Swallows

Last appearance
- MLB: October 4, 1987, for the St. Louis Cardinals
- NPB: August 23, 1988, for the Yakult Swallows

MLB statistics
- Batting average: .259
- Home runs: 237
- Runs batted in: 879

NPB statistics
- Batting average: .244
- Home runs: 19
- Runs batted in: 44
- Stats at Baseball Reference

Teams
- Baltimore Orioles (1973–1981); California Angels (1982–1987); St. Louis Cardinals (1987); Yakult Swallows (1988)

Career highlights and awards
- All-Star (1983); Silver Slugger Award (1982); Baltimore Orioles Hall of Fame

Douglas Vernon DeCinces (/dɛˈsɪnseɪ/ deh-SIN-say; born August 29, 1950) is an American former professional baseball player. He played in Major League Baseball (MLB) as a third baseman from 1973 to 1987 for the Baltimore Orioles, California Angels and St. Louis Cardinals. He also played for one season in the Nippon Professional Baseball league for the Yakult Swallows in 1988.

In 1982, DeCinces won the Silver Slugger Award, which is awarded annually to the best offensive player at each position, and was a member of the 1983 American League All-Star team. In 2006, he was inducted into the Baltimore Orioles Hall of Fame.

== Amateur career ==
DeCinces played PONY League Baseball and Colt League Baseball in Northridge, California, with fellow major league player Dwight Evans. He attended and played at Monroe High School in Sepulveda, California, and Los Angeles Pierce College, and is in Pierce College's Athletic Hall of Fame.

== Professional career ==
=== Minor leagues ===
DeCinces came up through the Orioles system, playing for the Asheville Orioles under manager Cal Ripken Sr. DeCinces famously rescued a pre-teen Cal Ripken Jr. during a pre-game incident involving a teenager firing a rifle into the air adjacent to the stadium where the Orioles played, causing panic amongst those on the field. Ripken Jr. (who was the team's bat boy at the time) was taken away to safety by DeCinces when the gunshots began.

=== Baltimore Orioles ===
He began his major league career at the age of 23 with the Baltimore Orioles late in the 1973 season. When the Orioles' Hall of Fame third baseman, Brooks Robinson, retired at the end of the 1977 season, DeCinces was given the difficult task of replacing the legendary player. Despite initial hostility from some Orioles fans as Robinson's replacement, he endured to play for the Orioles for a total of nine seasons.

On June 22, 1979, DeCinces hit a game-winning home run at Memorial Stadium off Detroit Tigers reliever Dave Tobik. The Orioles were trailing the Tigers 5-3 going into the bottom of the ninth inning. With one out, Ken Singleton hit a solo home run off Tobik to bring the Orioles within one. Eddie Murray reached base on a single, and, with two outs, DeCinces hit a two-run home run to give the Orioles a 6–5 victory. The win has been called "the night Oriole Magic was born." DeCinces said years later that the game and his home run "triggered something" and that "the emotion just multiplied from there," adding that the ensuing atmosphere of excitement was in no small part due to the excited call of the home run by announcers Bill O'Donnell and Charley Eckman on the Orioles' radio network. The Orioles went on to win the American League pennant in 1979.

DeCinces tagged out Dan Ford who was attempting to advance to third base on a force play that ended Game 2 of the 1979 American League Championship Series.

In 1981, DeCinces got into a feud with teammate Jim Palmer after DeCinces missed a line drive hit by Alan Trammell in a game against the Tigers. According to DeCinces, Palmer "was cussing me out and throwing his hands in the air" after the play. "Those balls have to be caught," Palmer told a paper. "Doug is reluctant to get in front of a ball." "I'd like to know where Jim Palmer gets off criticizing others," DeCinces responded. "Ask anybody–they're all sick of it. We're a twenty-four man team–and one prima donna. He thinks it's always someone else's fault." The feud simmered until June, when manager Earl Weaver said, "I see no cause for concern. The third baseman wants the pitcher to do a little better and the pitcher wants the third baseman to do a little better. I hope we can all do better and kiss and make up...The judge gave me custody of both of them." Palmer ultimately blamed Robinson for the dispute: "If Brooks hadn't been the best third-baseman of all time, the rest of the Orioles wouldn't have taken it for granted that any ball hit anywhere within the same county as Brooks would be judged perfectly, fielded perfectly, and thrown perfectly, nailing (perfectly) what seemed like every single opposing batter."

=== California Angels ===
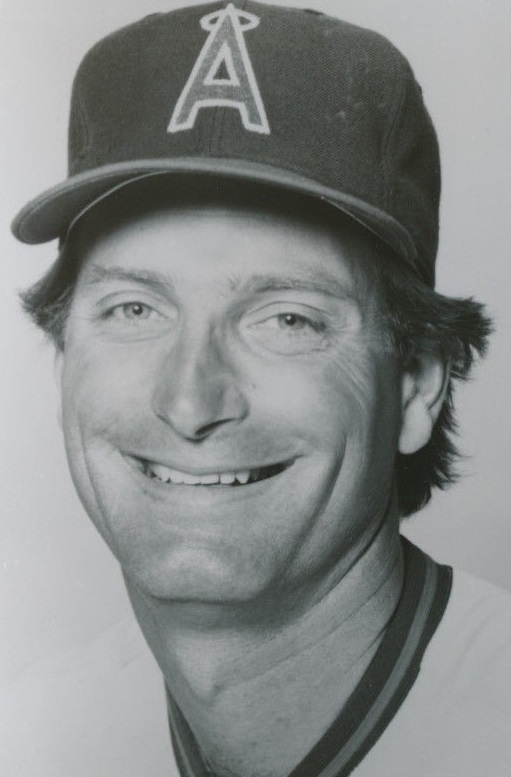
DeCinces with the California Angels in 1986

Both DeCinces and Ford were exchanged for each other in a trade that also sent Jeff Schneider from the Orioles to the Angels and was announced on January 28, 1982. The deal was delayed when Ford requested additional compensation because the Orioles were not one of six teams listed in his contract to which he could be traded without approval. The transaction became official upon his approval two days later on January 30. DeCinces' departure allowed rookie Cal Ripken Jr. to become the Orioles' new starting third baseman.

In 1982, DeCinces hit three home runs in a game twice within a five-day span for the Angels, first on August 3 in a 5–4 loss to the Minnesota Twins, and also on August 8 in a 9–5 victory over the Seattle Mariners. DeCinces was a member of the American League All Star Team in 1983.

=== St. Louis Cardinals ===
Released by the Angels on September 23, 1987, he concluded his major league career by playing in four games for the St. Louis Cardinals late in the 1987 season.

=== Japan ===
In 1988 DeCinces played for the Yakult Swallows in Japan's Nippon Pro Baseball's Central League. He hit a home run in his first at-bat for the Swallows when they played the Yomiuri Giants in the very first game of the Tokyo Dome. His experiences in Japan led to him being hired as a consultant for the 1992 film Mr. Baseball, about a veteran American ballplayer who is traded to a Japanese baseball club and is forced to contend with overwhelming expectations and cultural differences during the team's run at the pennant.

=== Career summary and statistics ===
DeCinces played for 15 seasons (1973–1987) in the major leagues for three different teams, including nine years with the Orioles and six years with the Angels. He twice finished in the top 25 voting for the American League Most Valuable Player, finishing third in 1982 and 11th in 1986 while playing for the California Angels. In 1982 he won the Silver Slugger Award, and in 23 postseason games, including three ALCS series and one World Series, he batted .270 (24-for-89) with 13 runs, 2 home runs and 9 RBI. DeCinces was inducted into the Baltimore Orioles Hall of Fame on August 26, 2006.

Years	Games	PA	AB	R	H	2B	3B	HR	RBI	BB	SO	AVG	OBP	SLG	FLD%
15	1649	6534	5809	778	1505	312	29	237	879	618	904	.259	.329	.445	.959

== Insider trading trial ==
On August 4, 2011, DeCinces, along with three others, was charged by the Securities and Exchange Commission (SEC) with insider trading ahead of a company buyout. In a civil suit, the SEC alleged that DeCinces and his associates made more than $1.7 million in illegal profits when Abbott Park, Ill.-based Abbott Laboratories Inc. announced its plan to purchase Advanced Medical Optics Inc. through a tender offer. Without admitting or denying the allegations, DeCinces agreed to pay $2.5 million to settle the SEC's charges.

In November 2012, DeCinces received a criminal indictment on insider trading related to the same incident and was charged with securities fraud and money laundering. On May 12, 2017, after a nearly two-month trial, a federal court jury in Santa Ana, California, found him guilty on 13 felony counts. He was also called to testify in the trial of others implicated in the insider trading case. On August 12, 2019, DeCinces was sentenced to eight months of home detention and ordered to pay a $10,000 fine. Former Angels teammate Rod Carew extolled DeCinces' charitable contributions at the sentencing, telling the court, "I am here because he has done so much more for other people".
