= Rich Dauer =

American baseball player and coach (1952–2025)

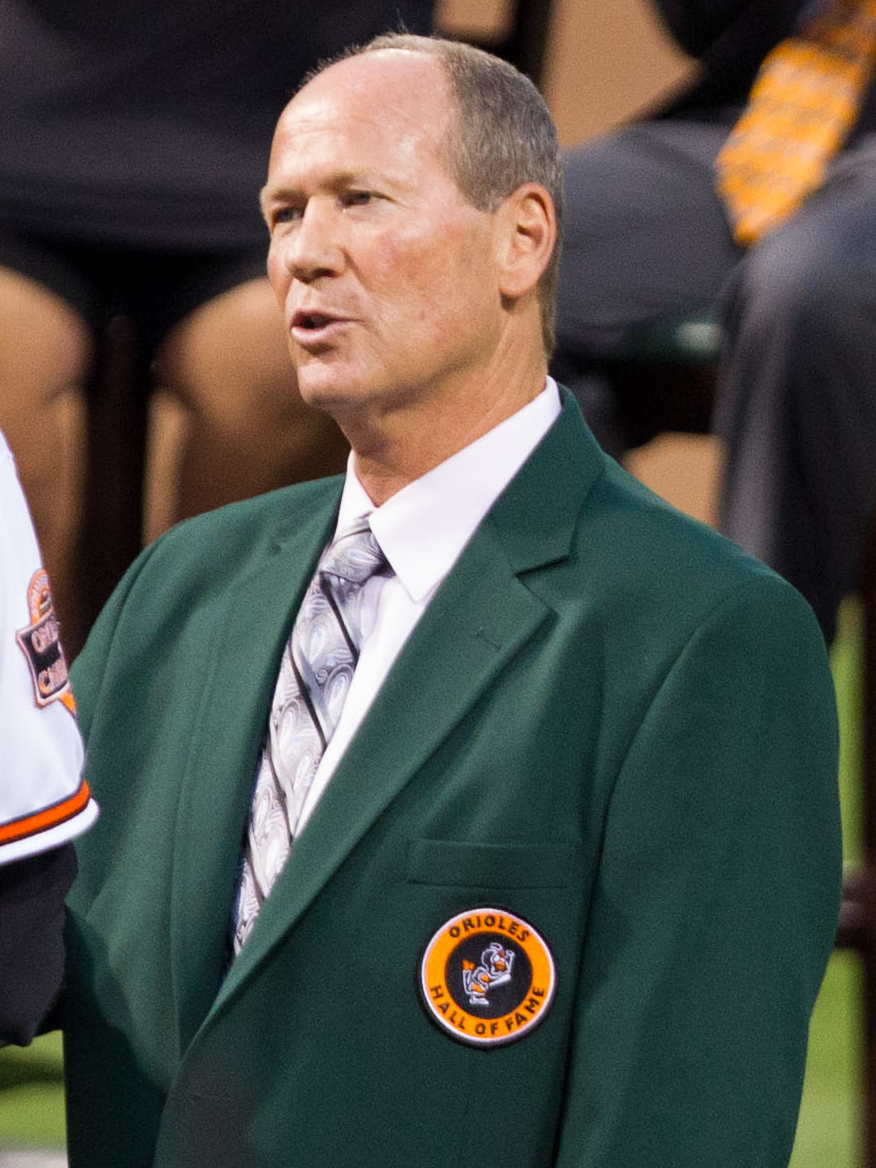
- Dauer during his induction into the Baltimore Orioles Hall of Fame, 2012
- Second baseman / Third baseman / Coach
- Born: July 27, 1952; San Bernardino, California, U.S.
- Died: February 3, 2025 (aged 72); Cincinnati, Ohio, U.S.
- Batted: Right Threw: Right

MLB debut
- September 11, 1976, for the Baltimore Orioles

Last MLB appearance
- September 29, 1985, for the Baltimore Orioles

MLB statistics
- Batting average: .257
- Home runs: 43
- Runs batted in: 372
- Stats at Baseball Reference

Teams
- As player: Baltimore Orioles (1976–1985); As coach: Cleveland Indians (1990–1991); Kansas City Royals (1997–2002); Milwaukee Brewers (2003–2005); Colorado Rockies (2009–2012); Houston Astros (2015–2017)

Career highlights and awards
- 2× World Series champion (1983, 2017); Baltimore Orioles Hall of Fame

Richard Fremont Dauer (July 27, 1952 – February 3, 2025) was an American professional baseball infielder and coach in Major League Baseball (MLB). He spent his entire 10-year MLB playing career with the Baltimore Orioles, winning the 1983 World Series. He was primarily a second baseman and also played third base. Following his career as a player, he spent 19 seasons as an MLB coach for numerous teams, winning the World Series in 2017 as the first base coach for the Houston Astros. He was inducted into the Baltimore Orioles Hall of Fame in 2012.

== Early years ==
Born on July 27, 1952, in San Bernardino, California, Dauer graduated from Colton High School in Colton, California, in 1970. He played college baseball for the Indians of San Bernardino Valley College and transferred to the University of Southern California (USC), where he was an All-American at third base. He helped the USC Trojans win the College World Series in 1973 and 1974, USC's fifth consecutive title and sixth in seven years.

== Pro playing career ==
Dauer was the 24th overall pick in the 1974 MLB draft in early June and began his pro career in with the Asheville Tourists in Double A, batting .328 with 11 HRs in 53 games. He began the 1975 season with the Triple A Rochester Red Wings, but struggled and moved back down to Asheville. The following season he flourished with the Red Wings, winning the league batting title with a .336 average and the International League Rookie of the Year, and sharing Most Valuable Player honors with Mickey Klutts and Joe Lis. He was called up by the Orioles in September but struggled, getting only four hits in 39 at bats.

Dauer's struggles continued at the start of 1977, as he had just one hit in his first 41 at bats. He began the year as the Orioles' starting second baseman but lost the role to Billy Smith. He credited Brooks Robinson and Lee May with helping him out, saying, "You can't make it in the Majors by yourself." By the end of the year, he had regained the second base job from Smith. He batted .243 with 74 hits, 15 doubles, five home runs, and 25 RBIs in 96 games while compiling a .982 fielding percentage at second base.

Dauer settled in as the Orioles everyday second baseman in 1978, while also starting several games at third, a role he would hold down through the 1984 season. Dauer struggled at the plate in 1985 and saw his playing time reduced. Following the season, the Orioles did not offer him a new contract and with no contract offers from other clubs, he retired. In 10 MLB seasons, Dauer

Dauer was given the nickname "Wacko" by Jim Palmer because of his sense of humor. During the Orioles' pursuit of the Milwaukee Brewers for the 1982 American League East title, he inspired his teammates with the rallying cry "Let's win one for the Duck," which was based on "Win one for the Gipper" and Earl Weaver's lame duck status as manager because of his impending retirement following the season.

Career highlights include trips to the World Series in 1979, where the Orioles lost 4 games to 3 to the Pittsburgh Pirates, and 1983, where the Orioles beat the Philadelphia Phillies in five games. That season, Dauer, infielder Todd Cruz, and catcher Rick Dempsey were regularly in the bottom third of the batting order and were affectionately known as "The Three Stooges", a moniker coined by Ken Singleton. Dauer was "Larry", Cruz was "Curly", and Dempsey was "Moe". Dauer's best postseason performance was in the 5–4 Game 4 win when he went 3-for-4 with a run scored and three RBI, including the one which accounted for the margin of victory.

Dauer holds two American League single-season fielding records for a second baseman, including 86 consecutive errorless games and 425 straight errorless chances, both set in 1978.

Dauer is one of the few players to have won a College World Series (twice) and an MLB World Series.

In 2012, Dauer was inducted into the Baltimore Orioles Hall of Fame, becoming the 12th member of the 1983 championship team to be inducted.

== Coaching career ==
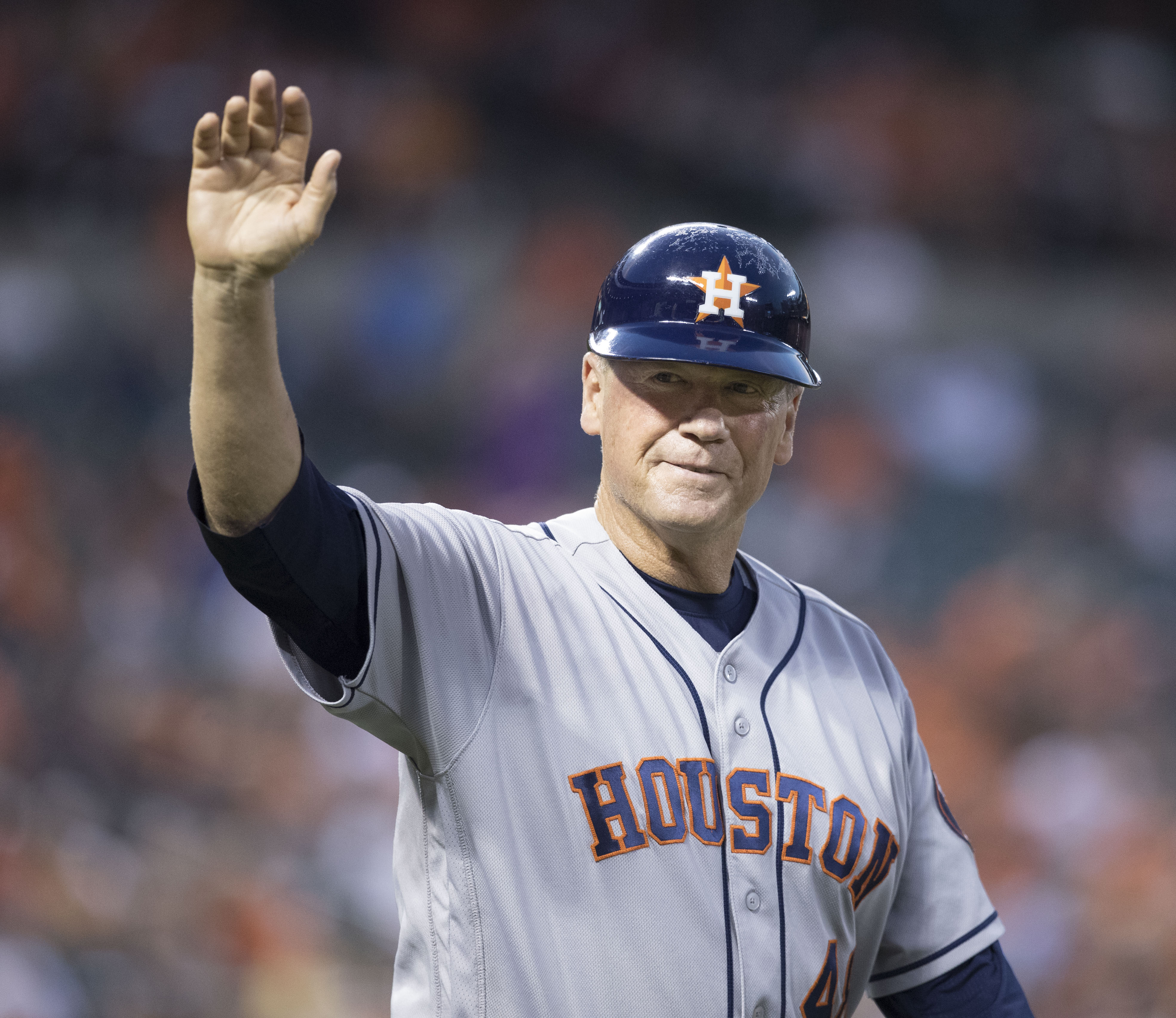
Dauer as first base coach for the Houston Astros in 2016

Dauer managed the independent minor league San Bernardino Spirit affiliate in 1988 and then spent the next three decades managing and coaching in the minors and majors for the Cleveland Indians, Orioles, San Diego Padres, Kansas City Royals, Milwaukee Brewers and Colorado Rockies.

He ended his coaching career as the first base coach for the Houston Astros, winning a second World Series in 2017.

== Personal life and death ==
Dauer acted in the 1988 motion picture Stealing Home, playing the coach of the San Bernardino Spirit.

At the 2017 World Series parade Dauer suffered a subdural hematoma as a result of a head injury that required emergency brain surgery. After recovering, he retired from coaching.

Dauer died on February 3, 2025, at the age of 72.

== See also ==
- List of Major League Baseball players who spent their entire career with one franchise

== Sources ==
- Rosenfeld, Harvey (1995). Iron Man: The Cal Ripken, Jr., Story. New York: St. Martin's Press. ISBN 0-312-13524-6.
