= Drungo Hazewood =

American baseball player (1959–2013)

- Outfielder
- Born: September 2, 1959; Mobile, Alabama, U.S.
- Died: July 28, 2013 (aged 53); Sacramento, California, U.S.
- Batted: Right Threw: Right

MLB debut
- September 19, 1980, for the Baltimore Orioles

Last MLB appearance
- October 4, 1980, for the Baltimore Orioles

MLB statistics
- Batting average: .000
- Home runs: 0
- Runs batted in: 0
- Stats at Baseball Reference

Teams
- Baltimore Orioles (1980)

Drungo LaRue Hazewood (September 2, 1959 – July 28, 2013) was an American outfielder in Major League Baseball. He played for the Baltimore Orioles in 1980. He spent the majority of his career in the minor leagues, playing for the Class AA Charlotte O's in the 1980s.

== Biography ==
Hazewood was a first-round pick, and the nineteenth player selected overall, by Baltimore in 1977. He spent that first season with the rookie-league Bluefield Orioles and was promoted to the Class A Miami Orioles for the 1978 season. In 1979, he hit 21 home runs with the Class AA Charlotte O's of the Southern League.

He made his major league debut in 1980. Despite a .583 batting average during spring training, he only joined the Orioles as a September call-up, appearing in six games and going hitless in five plate appearances with four strikeouts.

In 1981, Hazewood was back in the minor leagues. He struggled in 18 games with the Class AAA Rochester Red Wings, getting 6 hits in 64 at bats. He spent most of the year in Class AA with Charlotte. Hazewood hit .226 with 11 home runs and 28 stolen bases in 1982. In 1983, his last baseball season, Hazewood hit a combined .247 for two minor league teams. He left baseball during that season to take care of his mother, who had been diagnosed with breast cancer.

Hazewood was known as a power hitter who struck out frequently and had difficulty hitting a curveball. He had more strikeouts than hits in every major league and minor league season he played. Former teammates have recalled Hazewood's strength and speed. Cal Ripken Jr. described an incident in which Hazewood had snapped a baseball bat simply by twisting it.

Hazewood died from cancer at his home in South Sacramento, California, on July 28, 2013. He was 53 years old.
