= Lenn Sakata =

American baseball player (born 1954)

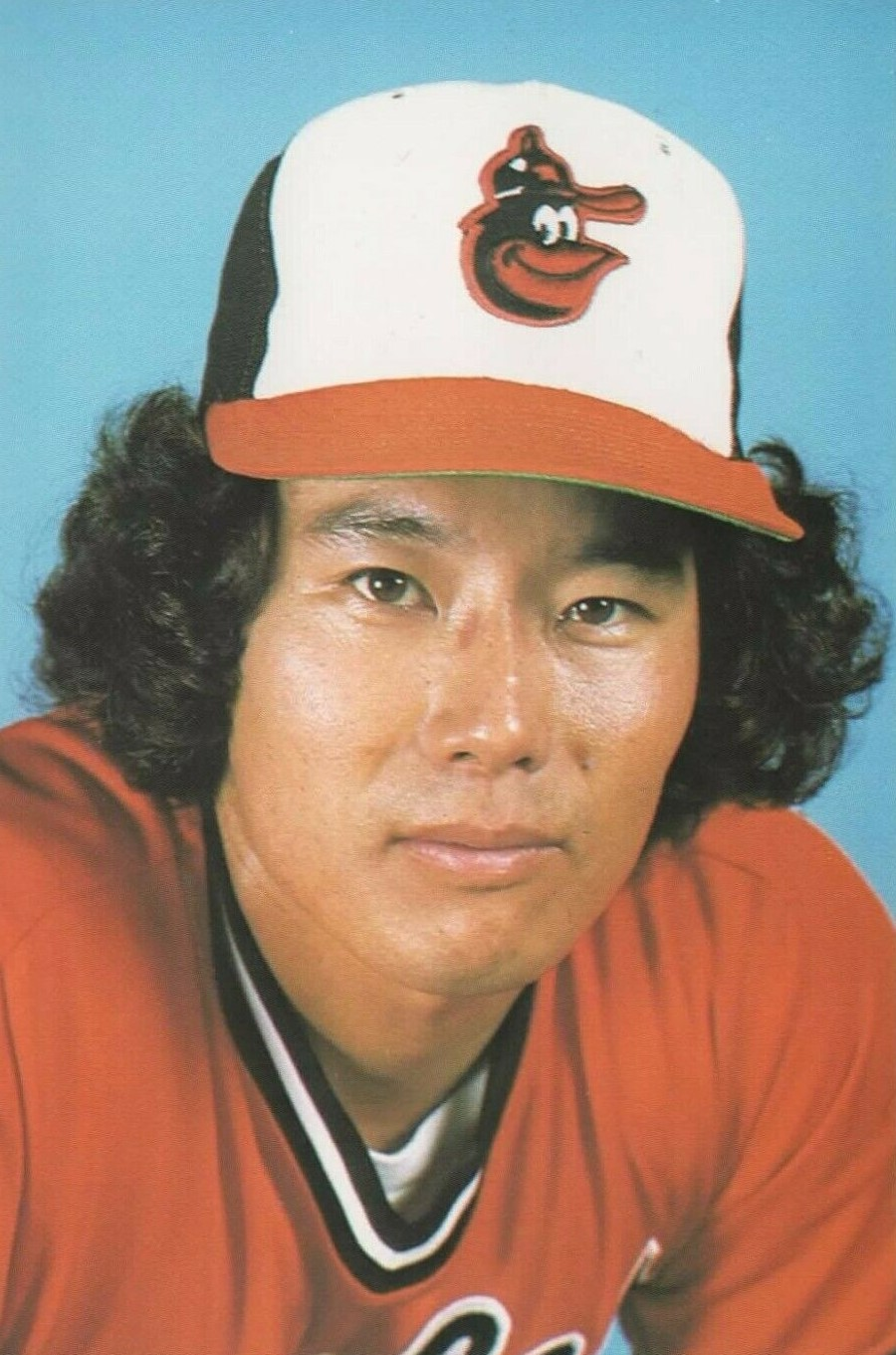
- Second baseman
- Born: June 8, 1954 (age 72); Honolulu, Hawaii, U.S.
- Batted: Right Threw: Right

MLB debut
- June 21, 1977, for the Milwaukee Brewers

Last MLB appearance
- June 28, 1987, for the New York Yankees

MLB statistics
- Batting average: .230
- Home runs: 25
- Runs batted in: 109
- Stats at Baseball Reference

Teams
- Milwaukee Brewers (1977–1979); Baltimore Orioles (1980–1985); Oakland Athletics (1986); New York Yankees (1987)

Career highlights and awards
- World Series champion (1983)

Lenn Haruki Sakata (born June 8, 1954) is an American former professional baseball player who played in Major League Baseball (MLB) primarily as a utility player from 1977 to 1987 and was a member of the Baltimore Orioles' 1983 World Series Championship team. He was the second Asian-American to play in MLB. As of 2021, he was the winningest manager in the San Francisco Giants' organizational history.

== Early life ==
Sakata was born on June 8, 1954, in Honolulu, Hawaii. He is Yonsei (fourth-generation American of Japanese ancestry). Sakata graduated from Kalani High School in 1971, and also attended Treasure Valley College. Sakata played two years of college baseball for the Gonzaga Bulldogs of Gonzaga University in Spokane, Washington. In 1974, he led Gonzaga in hits, home runs, and runs batted in (RBI).

== Professional baseball ==
Sakata was drafted in 1972 by the San Francisco Giants and 1974 by the San Diego Padres, but he did not sign with either team. In January 1975, the Milwaukee Brewers chose Sakata in the first round (10th pick overall) of the secondary phase of the free-agent draft.

=== Minor league ===
From 1975-79, Sakata played all or part of each season in the Brewers minor league system. In 1977, he had a .304 batting average with the Triple-A Spokane Indians of the Pacific Coast League (PCL). In 1979, he hit .300 for the Vancouver Canadians of the PCL. He played almost all of his games at second base during this period, with a fielding percentage never lower than .972.

Sakata was acquired by the Orioles from the Brewers for John Flinn on December 6, 1979. He played a portion of the 1980 season for the Orioles Triple-A affiliate, the Rochester Red Wings, batting .344 in 93 at bats.

=== Major league ===
Sakata was first called up to the major leagues by the Brewers in 1977. He started 50 games at second base and had a .985 fielding percentage, but hit only .162 in 154 at bats. The Brewers called him up again in 1978, and he hit .192 in 30 games, with a .975 fielding percentage. In 1979, he only played four games for the Brewers.

In 1980, he appeared in 43 games for the Orioles, hitting only .193, playing primarily at second base, with a .984 fielding percentage in over 200 innings in the field. He began 1981 as a reserve and missed time in May due to a sprained ankle. In September, he took over the shortstop position, replacing longtime Oriole shortstop Mark Belanger. Sakata was humble about this, saying, "I never looked at myself as the next Mark Belanger. It would have been pointless and arrogant for anybody to feel that way." He was the starting shortstop for the Orioles when Cal Ripken Jr., began his consecutive games played streak. When manager Earl Weaver decided to shift Ripken to short at the beginning of July 1982, he moved Sakata to second, keeping Sakata in the lineup.

1981 was the first season Sakata hit over .200 in the major leagues. 1982 saw career highs for Sakata in virtually every category, as he started 94 games (44 at second base and 50 at shortstop). He hit .260, with six home runs, 18 doubles, 40 runs, and 31 runs batted in (RBI), in 343 at bats. He had a .977 fielding percentage at second base, and .958 at shortstop. After that, his most at-bats in a major league season would be 168, and most starts, 38.

Sakata was on the 1983 Orioles team that won the World Series. He is remembered in Orioles lore during the 1983 pennant race when he substituted to play catcher, a position he had not played since childhood, in the tenth inning of the August 24, 1983, game at Baltimore's Memorial Stadium. The Orioles had replaced their starting catcher and his backup while rallying to tie the game in the ninth inning. Three Toronto Blue Jays hitters reached first base; each one took a big lead, thinking it would be easy to steal a base on Sakata. Tippy Martinez proceeded to pick each Blue Jays base runner off first base. Sakata then hit a walk-off home run in the bottom of the tenth to win the game. Also in 1983, Sakata ended a forgettable streak against the Chicago White Sox. For the first 6 seasons of his career, the White Sox were the only American League team Sakata had failed to get a hit against, having zero hits in his first 66 career at-bats against them, before finally getting a hit against the White Sox on August 11, 1983, in the 7th inning against Floyd Bannister.

Sakata played parts of his final three major league seasons with the Orioles (1985), and as a free agent signing with the Oakland Athletics (1986) and the New York Yankees (1987). While sparsely used in Oakland, he hit .353 in 34 at bats during his penultimate season. He spent part of each of these seasons with the teams' Triple-A affiliates. Playing for Oakland's Triple-A affiliate, the Tacoma Tigers, he may have had his best year in baseball as a batter, hitting .313, with 27 doubles, 66 runs, and 48 RBIs in 399 at bats; with 52 bases-on-balls and 11 stolen bases without getting caught stealing.

== Manager and coach ==
After his playing career ended, Sakata worked in the Athletics' minor league system. In 1988, he managed the Southern Oregon A's in short season Single-A. He was named the Northwest League's Manager of the Year. In 1989, he was promoted to manager of the Modesto A's of the California League (1989). From 1991-1994, he coached in the California Angels minor league system. From 1995-98, he worked as a coach for the Chiba Lotte Marines of the Japan Pacific League, under Bobby Valentine, and as a manager and coach in its minor league system. Sakata had to use a translator as he did not speak Japanese.

On returning to the United States, Sakata was hired by the San Francisco Giants. He managed the San Jose Giants of the High-A California League during five different periods: 1999, 2001, 2004–2007, and 2014 in the California League, and in 2021 as part of the Low-A West League (successor to the California League). He also managed the Giants' affiliate Bakersfield Blaze (2000) and the Colorado Rockies' affiliate Modesto Nuts (2012-13), both in the California League. On May 31, 2007, Sakata notched his 527th victory as a California League manager, setting the record for lifetime wins. His 899 wins are the most in California League history.

In 2002, Sakata managed the Fresno Grizzlies of the Triple-A Pacific Coast League.

Sakata became the farm team manager of the Chiba Lotte Marines in Japan in 2008. He returned to American baseball in 2011, becoming the hitting coach for Asheville Tourists (Low-A). After managing the Modesto Nuts from 2012 to 2013, Sakata rejoined the San Jose Giants in 2014 and was succeeded on January 10, 2015 by Russ Morman taking over as manager beginning the 2015 season. In 2020, Sakata was named the new manager of the Salem-Keizer Volcanoes. Sakata returned to the San José Giants for the 2021 season. The Giants swept the Fresno Grizzlies in winning the 2021 Low-A West Championship Series.

As of 2021, he had won more games as a manager in the San Francisco Giants' organization than any other person.

== Legacy and honors ==
Sakata was selected by CNN Sports Illustrated as one of the 50 greatest sports figures in Hawaii's history and is a member of the Hawaii Sports Hall of Fame located in the Bishop Museum. In 1988, Sakata was inducted Gonzaga University's Athletic Hall of Fame. In 2018, he was inducted to the California League Hall of Fame for his success as a manager.

There is a painting of Sakata on an exterior wall of San Jose's Excite Ballpark to commemorate Sakata's achievements with the team. In 2019, the team retired his number 14, making him the first person in franchise history to receive this honor.
