= Jeff Rineer =

American baseball player (born 1955)

- Pitcher
- Born: July 3, 1955 (age 69); Lancaster, Pennsylvania
- Batted: Left Threw: Left

MLB debut
- September 30, 1979, for the Baltimore Orioles

Last MLB appearance
- September 30, 1979, for the Baltimore Orioles

MLB statistics
- Games pitched: 1
- Earned run average: 0.00
- Strikeouts: 0
- Stats at Baseball Reference

Teams
- Baltimore Orioles (1979)

Jeffrey Alan Rineer (born July 3, 1955) is a former Major League Baseball (MLB) pitcher. Rineer played in one game for the Baltimore Orioles in 1979.

Rineer was selected by the Oakland Athletics in the 1973 MLB draft but declined to sign. He chose instead to enroll at Franklin & Marshall College, play college baseball and study accounting. He led all of NCAA Division III with 150 strikeouts as a freshman, including a 19-strikeout game against Western Maryland. He dropped out of Franklin & Marshall after the first semester of his sophomore year and began playing in recreational leagues where he attracted the attention of Major League scouts. The Baltimore Orioles made him the 43rd overall pick in the secondary phase of the 1975 MLB draft.
