= Mike Dimmel =

American baseball player (born 1954)

- Outfielder
- Born: October 16, 1954 (age 71); Albert Lea, Minnesota, U.S.
- Batted: Right Threw: Right

MLB debut
- September 2, 1977, for the Baltimore Orioles

Last MLB appearance
- April 18, 1979, for the St. Louis Cardinals

MLB statistics
- Batting average: .125
- Home runs: 0
- RBI: 0
- Stats at Baseball Reference

Teams
- Baltimore Orioles (1977–78); St. Louis Cardinals (1979)

Michael Wayne Dimmel (born October 16, 1954) is an American former professional baseball player who played 3 seasons in Major League Baseball. He was originally drafted by the Los Angeles Dodgers in the 6th round of the 1973 Major League Baseball draft. He was later drafted by the Baltimore Orioles from the Dodgers in the 1976 Rule 5 draft. After two seasons with the Orioles he was traded to the St. Louis Cardinals for Benny Ayala. Dimmel played high school baseball at Logansport High School for Coach Jim Turner and Butch Jones.

Dimmel is currently a Senior Vice President of Investments with Morgan Stanley out of its Dallas office. He began his business career as a financial adviser with Underwood Neuhaus in 1985.
