= John Flinn (baseball) =

American baseball player (born 1954)

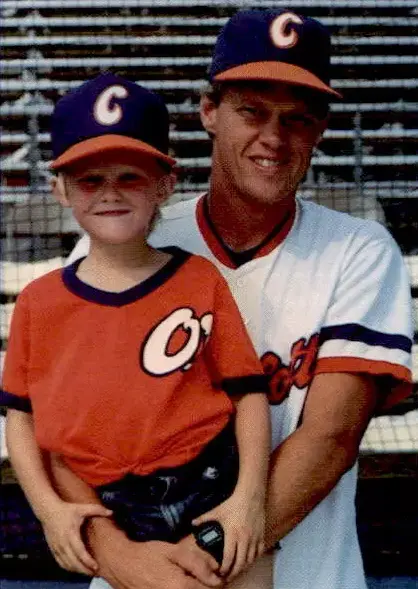
- Flinn (right) as a coach with the Charlotte O's c. 1986
- Pitcher
- Born: September 2, 1954 (age 71); Merced, California, U.S.
- Batted: Right Threw: Right

MLB debut
- May 6, 1978, for the Baltimore Orioles

Last MLB appearance
- September 30, 1982, for the Baltimore Orioles

MLB statistics
- Win–loss record: 5–2
- Earned run average: 4.37
- Strikeouts: 36
- Stats at Baseball Reference

Teams
- Baltimore Orioles (1978–1979, 1982); Milwaukee Brewers (1980)

John Richard Flinn (born September 2, 1954) is an American former professional baseball pitcher. Flinn pitched in all or part of four seasons between 1978 and 1982. He had two separate stints with the Baltimore Orioles, the first in 1978-1979, and the second in 1982, in between which he pitched for the Milwaukee Brewers in 1980. He had been traded from the Orioles to the Brewers for Lenn Sakata on December 6, 1979.

Jim Palmer recalled that "Flinn was a terrific pitcher with Rochester in Triple A. He had a good curve, good control, nice, sinking fastball," though Palmer noted that this was only "When he was relaxed."
