= Andrés Mora =

Mexican baseball player (1955–2015)

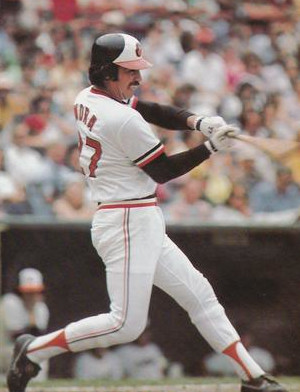
- Left fielder
- Born: May 25, 1955; Río Bravo, Coahuila, Mexico
- Died: June 12, 2015 (aged 60); Saltillo, Coahuila, Mexico
- Batted: Right Threw: Right

MLB debut
- April 13, 1976, for the Baltimore Orioles

Last MLB appearance
- May 6, 1980, for the Cleveland Indians

MLB statistics
- Batting average: .223
- Home runs: 27
- Runs batted in: 83
- Stats at Baseball Reference

Teams
- Baltimore Orioles (1976–1978); Cleveland Indians (1980)

Career highlights and awards
- Cañeros de Los Mochis #27 retired

Member of the Mexican Professional

Baseball Hall of Fame
- Induction: 2003

Andrés Mora Ibarra (May 25, 1955 – June 12, 2015) was a Mexican professional baseball outfielder. He played all or part of four seasons in the majors, between 1976 and 1980, for the Baltimore Orioles and Cleveland Indians of Major League Baseball (MLB). He continued to play professionally in Mexico until 1997 for the Saraperos de Saltillo, Tecolotes de Nuevo Laredo and Industriales de Monterrey, and ranks 3rd all time in home runs in Mexican League history. He was elected to the Mexican Professional Baseball Hall of Fame in 2003. He died on June 12, 2015, of pneumonia.

In 2020, Mora was selected as the starting left fielder of the Mexican League Historic Ideal Team by a committee of baseball journalists and historians.

In February 2025, Mora was selected by a committee of journalists as the left fielder for the Mexican League Centennial All-Time Team on the occasion of the league's hundredth anniversary.
