= Benny Ayala =

Puerto Rican baseball player (born 1951)

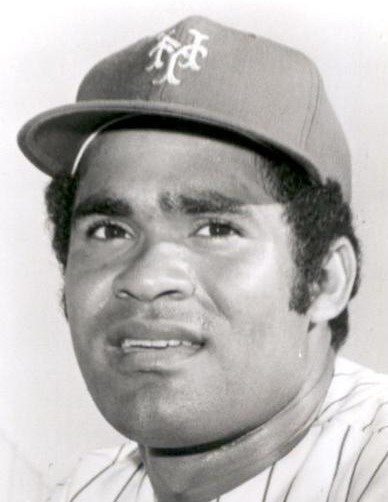
- Designated hitter / Left fielder
- Born: February 7, 1951 (age 75); Yauco, Puerto Rico
- Batted: Right Threw: Right

MLB debut
- August 27, 1974, for the New York Mets

Last MLB appearance
- October 2, 1985, for the Cleveland Indians

MLB statistics
- Batting average: .251
- Home runs: 38
- Runs batted in: 145
- Stats at Baseball Reference

Teams
- New York Mets (1974, 1976); St. Louis Cardinals (1977); Baltimore Orioles (1979–1984); Cleveland Indians (1985)

Career highlights and awards
- World Series champion (1983)

Benigno Ayala Felix (/ɑːˈjɑːlə/ ah-YAH-lə; born February 7, 1951) is a Puerto Rican former Major League Baseball player who had a 10-season career from 1974 to 1985. He played outfield, first base, and designated hitter. He played for the New York Mets and St. Louis Cardinals both of the National League and the Baltimore Orioles and Cleveland Indians both of the American League.

== Career ==
Ayala made his major league debut as the Mets' starting left fielder at Shea Stadium on August 27, 1974. With one out and the bases empty, he hit a home run in his first at bat off the Houston Astros' Tom Griffin to open a three-run rally in the bottom of the second inning in a 4–2 Mets victory. Wearing uniform number 18 and strictly a corner outfielder, Ayala played in only 45 games with the Mets (23 in 1974, 22 in 1976). After spending 1974 with New York, he spent 1975 in the minors, 1976 with the New York Mets. He was traded from the Mets to the St. Louis Cardinals for Doug Clarey during spring training on March 20, 1977.

He was acquired by the Baltimore Orioles from the Cardinals for Mike Dimmel on January 16, 1979 and assigned to the Rochester Red Wings. His contract was purchased by the Orioles from the Red Wings 3 1/2 months later on April 30. With Baltimore, Ayala routinely platooned with Gary Roenicke and John Lowenstein.

Ayala appeared in two World Series with Baltimore. In 1979, he belted a two-run homer in the Orioles' Game 3 win over the Pirates. In 1983, he made one pinch-hitting appearance against the Phillies. He singled home the tying run in Game 3 and later scored the winning run. The Orioles elected not to renew the option year on his contract on September 28, 1984.

== See also ==
- List of Major League Baseball players from Puerto Rico
- Home run in first Major League at-bat
