= Larry Harlow (baseball) =

American baseball player (born 1951)

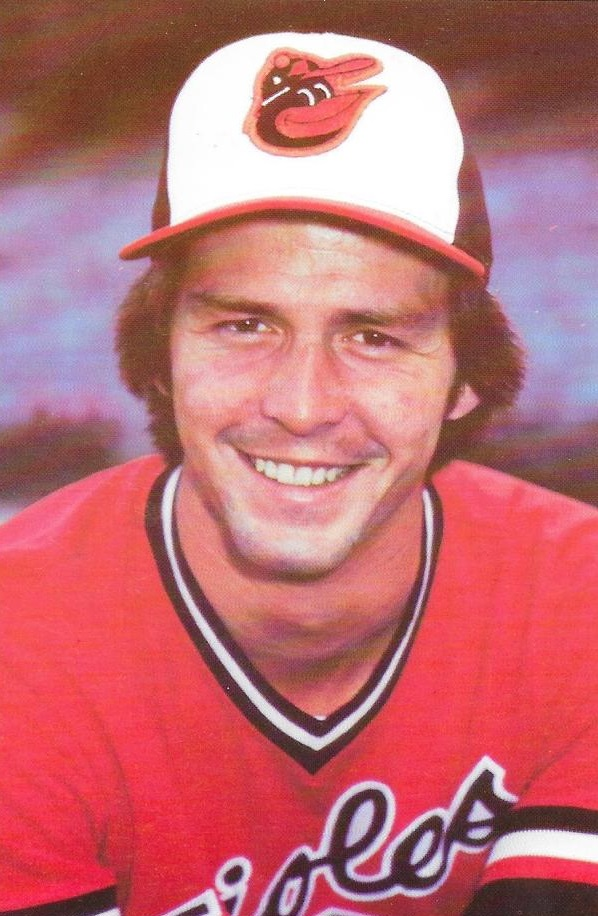
- Outfielder
- Born: November 13, 1951 (age 74); Colorado Springs, Colorado, U.S.
- Batted: Left Threw: Left

Professional debut
- MLB: September 20, 1975, for the Baltimore Orioles
- NPB: April 3, 1982, for the Yakult Swallows

Last appearance
- MLB: October 3, 1981, for the California Angels
- MLB: June 19, 1982, for the Yakult Swallows

MLB statistics
- Batting average: .248
- Home runs: 12
- Runs batted in: 72

NPB statistics
- Batting average: .164
- Home runs: 4
- Runs batted in: 12
- Stats at Baseball Reference

Teams
- Baltimore Orioles (1975–1979); California Angels (1979–1981); Yakult Swallows (1982)

Larry Duane Harlow (born November 13, 1951) is an American former professional baseball player who played six seasons in the Major Leagues with the Baltimore Orioles and California Angels.

Harlow was born in Colorado Springs but moved to Aztec, New Mexico at five years old. Harlow attended Aztec High School where he played football and ran track while playing baseball in the summers. He attended Mesa Community College prior to signing with the Baltimore Orioles as an amateur free agent on August 24, 1970. He played parts of four seasons with the Orioles before being traded to the California Angels for Floyd Rayford and cash on June 3, 1979. The transaction was the result of Harlow's lack of playing time with the Orioles and the Angels' need for an outfielder to replace the injured Rick Miller. Most of Harlow's career highs came during the 1978 season with Baltimore when he scored 67 runs, recorded 112 hits, and 14 stolen bases. Harlow played his final MLB game on October 3, 1981, finishing with a career .248 batting average.

Harlow made the only pitching appearance in his MLB playing career in a one-sided 24–10 loss to the Toronto Blue Jays at Exhibition Stadium on June 26, 1978. The first of two consecutive position players used as a relief pitcher, he entered the game with the Orioles losing 19–6 at the start of the fifth inning. After retiring the first two batters, he walked three of the next four, all of whom scored as a result of a Rico Carty two-run single and a John Mayberry three‐run homer. He was replaced by Elrod Hendricks after issuing a fourth walk.

The highlight of Harlow's career was in Game 3 of the 1979 American League Championship Series against his former team with his walk-off double to left field off Don Stanhouse scoring Brian Downing from second base in the ninth inning of a 4–3 win that prevented the Angels from being swept by the Orioles.

Following his Major League career, Harlow played one season in Japan for the Yakult Swallows in 1982.
