= Billy Smith (second baseman) =

American baseball player (born 1953)

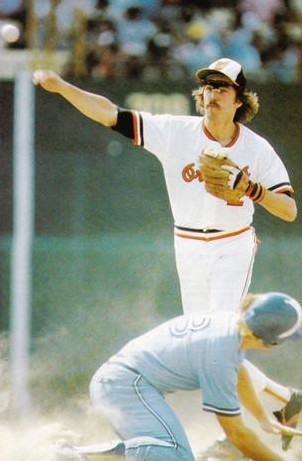
- Second baseman
- Born: July 14, 1953 (age 73); Hodge, Louisiana, U.S.
- Batted: Switch Threw: Right

MLB debut
- April 13, 1975, for the California Angels

Last MLB appearance
- September 24, 1981, for the San Francisco Giants

MLB statistics
- Batting average: .230
- Home runs: 17
- Runs batted in: 111
- Stats at Baseball Reference

Teams
- California Angels (1975–1976); Baltimore Orioles (1978–1979); San Francisco Giants (1981)

Billy Ed Smith (born July 14, 1953) is an American former professional baseball player and former Major League Baseball second baseman. He played all or part of six seasons in the Majors between 1975 and 1981.

Smith was originally drafted in the 3rd round (61st overall) by the California Angels in 1971 out of John Jay High School in San Antonio, TX. He played in their farm system for several years until making his debut early in the 1975 season. That year, he mainly played shortstop, batting just .203 in 59 games. After a brief stint in the majors in 1976, he was let go by the Angels.

Smith was signed by the Baltimore Orioles prior to the 1977 season, and in spring training he was chosen to replace Bobby Grich as the Orioles' starting second baseman. As the year went on, however, he lost playing time to rookie Rich Dauer, and he finished 1977 with a batting average of .215 with just 29 RBI in 367 at bats. In 1978, Smith split time with Dauer again, and he boosted his average to .260. After backing up Dauer again during the Orioles' pennant-winning season in 1979, Smith was released by the Orioles the following spring.

In June, Smith signed a minor league contract with the Philadelphia Phillies, but never made it to the majors for them. He was purchased from the Phillies by the San Francisco Giants in March 1981, but after hitting .180 in 36 games for the Giants his major league career was over.
