= Dave Skaggs =

American baseball player (born 1951)

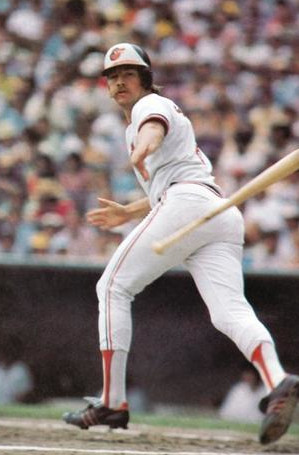
- Catcher
- Born: June 12, 1951 (age 75); Santa Monica, California, U.S.
- Batted: Right Threw: Right

MLB debut
- April 17, 1977, for the Baltimore Orioles

Last MLB appearance
- October 4, 1980, for the California Angels

MLB statistics
- Batting average: .241
- Home runs: 3
- Runs batted in: 49
- Stats at Baseball Reference

Teams
- Baltimore Orioles (1977–1980); California Angels (1980)

David Lindsey Skaggs (born June 12, 1951) is an American former Major League Baseball catcher. He played all or part of four seasons, from 1977 until 1980, for the Baltimore Orioles and California Angels. As a member of the Orioles, he was the last Oriole to wear #8 before Cal Ripken Jr.

Skaggs was the starting catcher in game 4 of the 1979 World Series against the Pittsburgh Pirates, a game in which the Orioles won 9-6.

The Dave Skaggs family would appear later in the 1980s on an episode of the popular game show Family Feud.

== Sources ==
- Career statistics from Baseball Reference · Baseball Reference (Minors) · Retrosheet · Baseball Almanac
