= Ken Singleton =

American baseball player (born 1947)

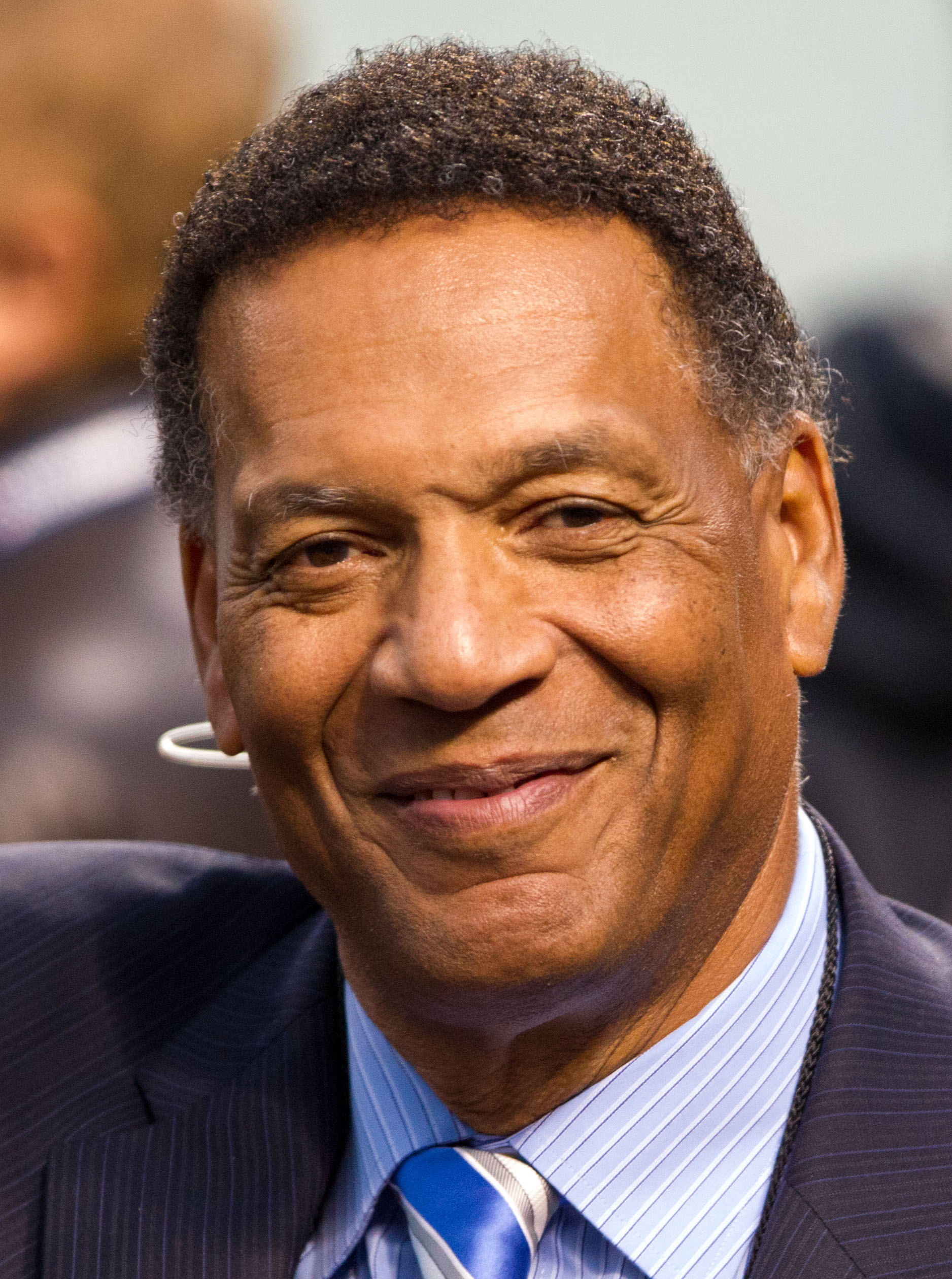
- Singleton in 2012
- Right fielder / Designated hitter
- Born: June 10, 1947 (age 79); Manhattan, New York, U.S.
- Batted: Switch Threw: Right

MLB debut
- June 24, 1970, for the New York Mets

Last MLB appearance
- September 25, 1984, for the Baltimore Orioles

MLB statistics
- Batting average: .282
- Hits: 2,029
- Home runs: 246
- Runs batted in: 1,065
- Stats at Baseball Reference

Teams
- New York Mets (1970–1971); Montreal Expos (1972–1974); Baltimore Orioles (1975–1984)

Career highlights and awards
- 3× All-Star (1977, 1979, 1981); World Series champion (1983); Roberto Clemente Award (1982); Baltimore Orioles Hall of Fame

Kenneth Wayne Singleton (born June 10, 1947) is an American former professional baseball player and television sports commentator. He played in Major League Baseball (MLB) as an outfielder and designated hitter from 1970 to 1984, most prominently as a member of the Baltimore Orioles, where he was a three-time All-Star player and was a member of the 1983 World Series winning team. He also played for the New York Mets and the Montreal Expos.

In 1982, Singleton was named the recipient of the Roberto Clemente Award and, in 1986, he was inducted into the Baltimore Orioles Hall of Fame. He went on to a long career as a broadcaster, most prominently for the New York Yankees from 1997 to 2021.

== Early life ==
Singleton was born in Manhattan, a borough of New York City, and raised in nearby Mount Vernon. He played baseball in the Bronx Federation League at Macombs Dam Park, across the street from Yankee Stadium.

Singleton graduated from Mount Vernon High School, where he played baseball and basketball. After graduating in 1965, Singleton enrolled at Hofstra University on an athletic scholarship for basketball.

== Professional career ==
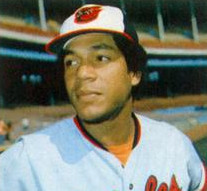
Singleton as a Baltimore Oriole

The New York Mets chose Singleton in the first round, with the third overall pick, of the January phase of the 1967 Major League Baseball draft. He signed with the Mets for a $10,000 signing bonus. Singleton made his major league debut with the Mets on June 24, 1970, at the age of 23.

On April 5, 1972, the Mets traded Singleton to the Montreal Expos with infielders Tim Foli and Mike Jorgensen for Rusty Staub. Singleton's best year of the three in Montreal was 1973, when he led the league in on-base percentage (one of nine top-ten finishes in that category over the course of his career) and collected 23 home runs, 103 runs batted in (RBIs) and a .302 batting average (his first .300 season).

On December 4, 1974, at the Winter Meetings, the Baltimore Orioles acquired Singleton and Mike Torrez from the Expos for Dave McNally, Rich Coggins and minor-league right-handed pitcher Bill Kirkpatrick. During his ten years in Baltimore, Singleton played the best baseball of his career as the Orioles won two pennants, in 1979 and 1983, and won the 1983 World Series. In 1977, he posted a .328 batting average and a .438 on-base percentage, both career highs. He finished second in the American League with a 6.9 Wins Above Replacement (WAR) behind only Rod Carew and, his .945 On-base plus slugging (OPS) was third behind only Carew and Jim Rice.

Singleton finished second to Don Baylor in the American League Most Valuable Player Award voting in 1979 after establishing career-highs with 35 home runs and 111 RBI, the former being a franchise record for a switch-hitter in a season until it was surpassed by Anthony Santander in 2024. He accumulated 1,455 hits as an Oriole.

He was described by his manager with the Orioles Earl Weaver as "the kind of hitter who can start a rally by getting on base or end one by driving in the winning run." Being a slow runner was the only deficiency he had as a ballplayer. He stole just 21 bases on 57 attempts in his career. Singleton played in his final major league game on September 25, 1984, at the age of 37. The Orioles elected not to renew the option year on his contract three days later on September 28.

== Career statistics ==
In a 15-year major league career, Singleton played in 2,082 games, accumulating 2,029 hits in 7,189 at bats for a .282 career batting average along with 246 home runs, 1,065 runs batted in and an on-base percentage of .388. He had a career .980 fielding percentage. Singleton ranks among the Orioles all-time leaders in numerous offensive statistics. In his 10 years as an Oriole, he hit .290 or better in 5 of those years. An All-Star in 1977, 1979 and 1981, he won the Roberto Clemente Award in 1982. His highest finish in the Most Valuable Player Award balloting was in 1979, when he finished second to Don Baylor. He was third in 1977, behind Al Cowens and the winner, Rod Carew.

== Broadcasting career ==
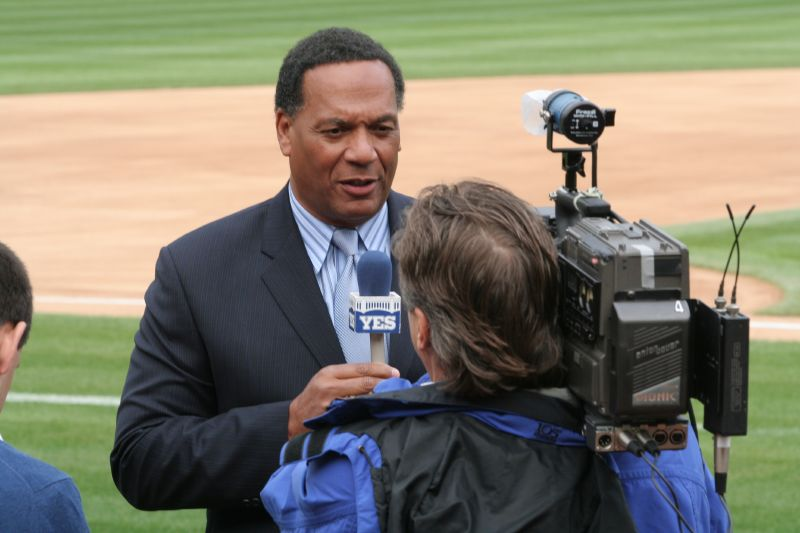
Singleton in 2006 as a television broadcaster for YES

After retiring as a baseball player, Singleton began his broadcasting career as a sportscaster for WJZ-TV in Baltimore in the mid-1980s and TSN in Canada, first as a color commentator on telecasts for the Toronto Blue Jays (1985 and 1986) and then television color commentator and radio play-by-play and color commentator for the Montreal Expos (1987–1996).

From 1997–2021, Singleton was a commentator for the New York Yankees on the YES Network and WPIX, serving as both a color commentator and fill-in play-by-play announcer, along with partner and play-by-play announcer Michael Kay. He also worked as an announcer for Yankee games on the MSG Network, before the inception of YES and joined the Yankees broadcasting team in 1997.

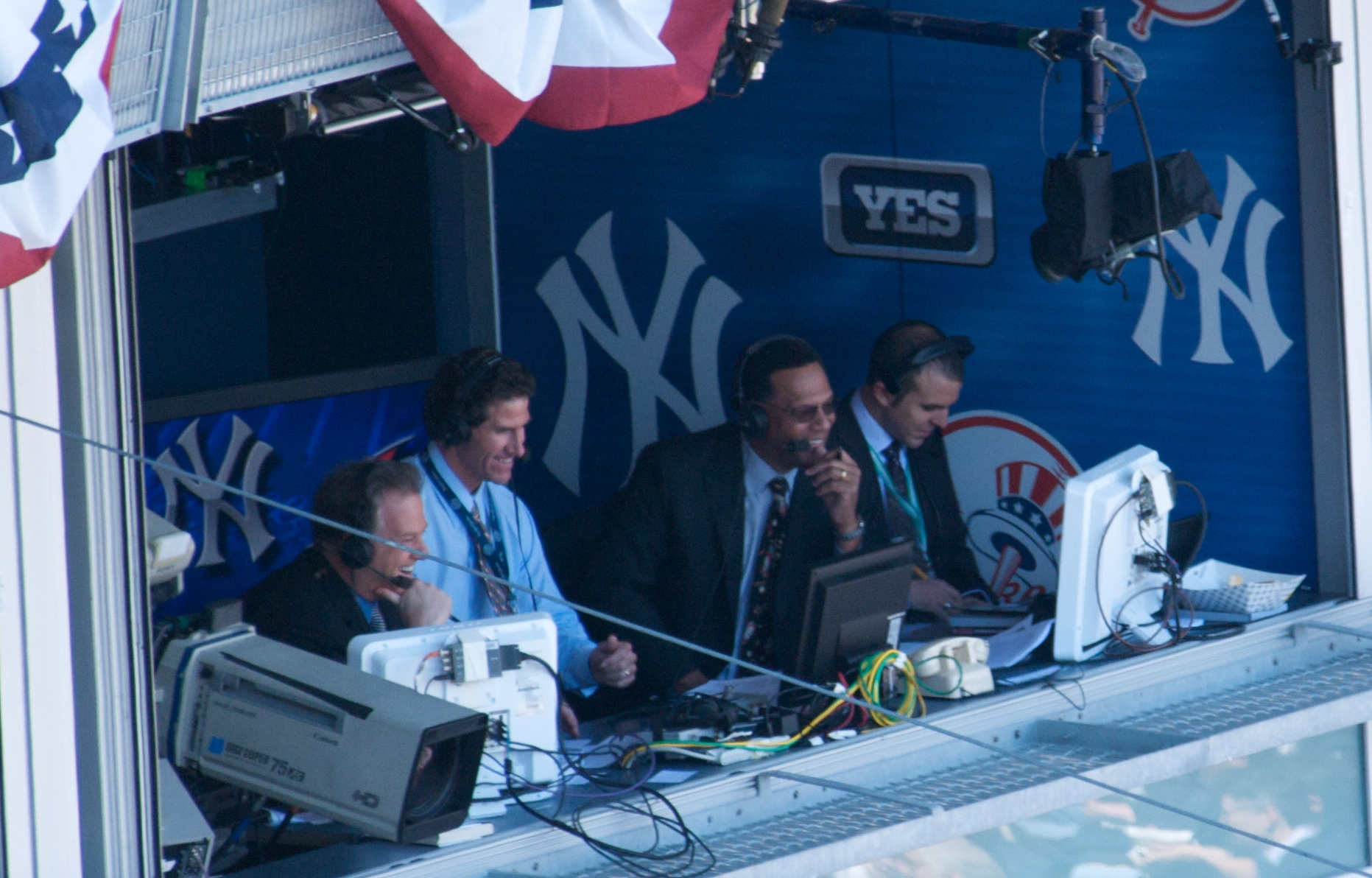
Singleton (second from right) calling a New York Yankees game on YES, along with (L to R) Michael Kay, Paul O'Neill, and Ryan Ruocco.

His trademark calls when filling in on play-by-play include "This one is gone" for a home run and "Look out!" for a hard hit foul ball into the crowd or dugout, or when a pitch comes close to/hits a batter. He will also occasionally call a pitch a "chuck and duck" for a ball hit right back toward the pitcher. He also calls a pitch down the heart of the plate a "cookie".

On March 12, 2018, Singleton initially announced that he would be retiring from the broadcasting booth after the 2018 season. However, on August 9, 2018, he announced that he had decided to postpone his retirement until after the 2019 season. During the Yankees-Rays broadcast on YES on September 25, 2019, Singleton announced he would be returning to the Yankees booth for the 2020 season. According to the New York Post, Singleton announced that he would be retiring after the 2021 season. On October 2, 2021 during the penultimate game of the regular season, he officially announced his retirement on air to take effect the following day.

== Personal life ==
Singleton is a cousin of former NBA player and former Philadelphia 76ers head coach Glenn "Doc" Rivers, and the father of former minor league outfielder Justin Singleton.

Singleton grew up in a house in Mount Vernon, New York, once owned by the family of former Brooklyn Dodger Ralph Branca. According to broadcast references, Singleton still resides in the Baltimore area.

Singleton sits on the Board of Directors for the Cool Kids Campaign, a non-profit organization based in Towson, Maryland. One of Singleton's roles on the Board of Directors is to host the Celebrity Golf Tournament each June.

In the 1986 edition of the Bill James Historical Baseball Abstract, James' wife Susan McCarthy picked Ken Singleton as one of the best-looking players in the 1970s. In a subsequent edition, James wrote that, upon reading the entry, Singleton sent her a thank-you card.

== See also ==
- List of Major League Baseball career home run leaders
- List of Major League Baseball career hits leaders
- List of Major League Baseball career runs batted in leaders
