= 1973 Minnesota Twins season =

1973 Minnesota Twins
- League: American League
- Division: West
- Ballpark: Metropolitan Stadium
- City: Bloomington, Minnesota
- Owners: Calvin Griffith (majority owner, with Thelma Griffith Haynes)
- General managers: Calvin Griffith
- Managers: Frank Quilici
- Television: WCCO-TV (Ray Scott, Ralph Fritz)
- Radio: 830 WCCO AM (Herb Carneal, Ray Christensen)

The 1973 Minnesota Twins season was the 13th season for the Minnesota Twins franchise in the Twin Cities of Minnesota, their 13th season at Metropolitan Stadium and the 73rd overall in the American League. The Twins finished 81–81, third in the American League West.

== Offseason ==
- November 30, 1972: Rich Reese was purchased from the Twins by the Detroit Tigers.
- November 30, 1972: César Tovar was traded by the Twins to the Philadelphia Phillies for Joe Lis, Ken Sanders and Ken Reynolds.

== Regular season ==
With the American League's new designated hitter rule taking effect, on April 6 in Oakland, California, Tony Oliva became the first DH to hit a home run.

On July 3, Tony Oliva hit three home runs against the Kansas City Royals. The Twins record feat was accomplished twice before, by both Bob Allison and Harmon Killebrew in 1963.

Two Twins made the All-Star Game: second baseman Rod Carew and pitcher Bert Blyleven. 907,499 fans attended Twins games, the third lowest total in the American League.

On September 27, California Angels pitcher Nolan Ryan struck out sixteen Twins and set a major league season mark of 383 strikeouts. Minnesota's Rich Reese was Ryan's 383rd victim.

Pitcher Bert Blyleven finished with a 20–17 record and set several team records: total innings pitched (325.0), complete games (25), shutouts (9), and strikeouts (258).

Rod Carew won his third AL batting title with a .350 average. Bobby Darwin continued to show potential as a hitter with 18 home runs and 90 RBI. Tony Oliva limped through the season, hitting 16 HR and collecting 92 RBI. Bert Blyleven won 20 games for the first time, and three other pitchers had double digit wins: Jim Kaat (11–12), Dick Woodson (10–8), and Joe Decker (10–10). Kaat also won his 12th Gold Glove Award.

=== Season standings ===
AL West
Team	W	L	Pct.	GB	Home	Road
Oakland Athletics	94	68	.580	—	50‍–‍31	44‍–‍37
Kansas City Royals	88	74	.543	6	48‍–‍33	40‍–‍41
Minnesota Twins	81	81	.500	13	37‍–‍44	44‍–‍37
California Angels	79	83	.488	15	43‍–‍38	36‍–‍45
Chicago White Sox	77	85	.475	17	40‍–‍41	37‍–‍44
Texas Rangers	57	105	.352	37	35‍–‍46	22‍–‍59

=== Record vs. opponents ===
1973 American League record Sources:
Team	BAL	BOS	CAL	CWS	CLE	DET	KC	MIL	MIN	NYY	OAK	TEX
Baltimore	—	7–11	6–6	8–4	12–6	9–9	8–4	15–3	8–4	9–9	5–7	10–2
Boston	11–7	—	7–5	6–6	9–9	3–15	8–4	12–6	6–6	14–4	4–8	9–3
California	6–6	5–7	—	8–10	5–7	7–5	10–8	5–7	10–8	6–6	6–12	11–7
Chicago	4–8	6–6	10–8	—	7–5	5–7	6–12	3–9	9–9	8–4	6–12	13–5
Cleveland	6–12	9–9	7–5	5–7	—	9–9	2–10	9–9	7–5	7–11	3–9	7–5
Detroit	9–9	15–3	5–7	7–5	9–9	—	4–8	12–6	5–7	7–11	7–5	5–7
Kansas City	4–8	4–8	8–10	12–6	10–2	8–4	—	8–4	9–9	6–6	8–10	11–7
Milwaukee	3–15	6–12	7–5	9–3	9–9	6–12	4–8	—	8–4	10–8	4–8	8–4
Minnesota	4–8	6–6	8–10	9–9	5–7	7–5	9–9	4–8	—	3–9	14–4	12–6
New York	9–9	4–14	6–6	4–8	11–7	11–7	6–6	8–10	9–3	—	4–8	8–4
Oakland	7–5	8–4	12–6	12–6	9–3	5–7	10–8	8–4	4–14	8–4	—	11–7
Texas	2–10	3–9	7–11	5–13	5–7	7–5	7–11	4–8	6–12	4–8	7–11	—

=== Notable transactions ===
- June 5, 1973: Luis Gómez was drafted by the Twins in the 7th round of the 1973 Major League Baseball draft.
- August 15, 1973: Jim Kaat was selected off waivers from the Twins by the Chicago White Sox.
- August 17, 1973: Rich Reese was signed as a free agent by the Twins.

=== Roster ===
1973 Minnesota Twins
Roster
Pitchers: 20 Vic Albury; 18 Eddie Bane; 28 Bert Blyleven; 24 Bill Campbell; 23 Ray Corbin; 21 Joe Decker; 16 Danny Fife; 30 Dave Goltz; 17 Bill Hands; 36 Jim Kaat; 20 Ken Sanders; 19 Jim Strickland; 13 Dick Woodson	Catchers: 27 Glenn Borgmann; 15 George Mitterwald; 8 Phil Roof; Infielders: 4 Steve Braun; 29 Rod Carew; 3 Harmon Killebrew; 22 Craig Kusick; 10 Joe Lis; 14 Dan Monzon; 1 Rich Reese; 12 Eric Soderholm; 7 Jerry Terrell; 5 Danny Thompson	Outfielders: 25 Mike Adams; 11 Steve Brye; 2 Bobby Darwin; 9 Larry Hisle; 26 Jim Holt; 6 Tony Oliva; 12 Danny Walton	Manager: 43 Frank Quilici; Coaches: 44 Vern Morgan; 45 Buck Rodgers; 42 Ralph Rowe; 46 Al Worthington

== Player stats ==
= Indicates team leader

=== Batting ===
==== Starters by position ====
Note: Pos = Position; G = Games played; AB = At bats; H = Hits; Avg. = Batting average; HR = Home runs; RBI = Runs batted in

Pos	Player	G	AB	H	Avg.	HR	RBI
C	George Mitterwald	125	432	112	.259	16	64
1B	Joe Lis	103	253	62	.245	9	25
2B	Rod Carew	149	580	203	.350	6	62
SS	Danny Thompson	99	347	78	.225	1	36
3B	Steve Braun	115	361	102	.283	6	42
LF	Jim Holt	132	441	131	.297	11	58
CF	Larry Hisle	143	545	148	.272	15	64
RF	Bobby Darwin	145	560	141	.252	18	90
DH	Tony Oliva	146	571	166	.291	16	92

==== Other batters ====
Note: G = Games played; AB = At bats; H = Hits; Avg. = Batting average; HR = Home runs; RBI = Runs batted in

Player	G	AB	H	Avg.	HR	RBI
Jerry Terrell	124	438	116	.265	1	32
Steve Brye	92	278	73	.263	6	33
Harmon Killebrew	69	248	60	.242	5	32
Phil Roof	47	117	23	.197	1	15
Eric Soderholm	35	111	33	.297	1	9
Danny Walton	37	96	17	.177	4	8
Dan Monzon	39	76	17	.224	0	4
Mike Adams	55	66	14	.212	3	6
Craig Kusick	15	48	12	.250	0	4
Glenn Borgmann	12	34	9	.265	0	9
Rich Reese	22	23	4	.174	1	3

=== Pitching ===
==== Starting pitchers ====
Note: G = Games pitched; IP = Innings pitched; W = Wins; L = Losses; ERA = Earned run average; SO = Strikeouts

Player	G	IP	W	L	ERA	SO
Bert Blyleven	40	325.0	20	17	2.52	258
Jim Kaat	29	181.2	11	12	4.41	93
Joe Decker	29	170.1	10	10	4.17	109
Dick Woodson	23	141.1	10	8	3.95	53
Danny Fife	10	51.2	3	2	4.35	18

==== Other pitchers ====
Note: G = Games pitched; IP = Innings pitched; W = Wins; L = Losses; ERA = Earned run average; SO = Strikeouts

Player	G	IP	W	L	ERA	SO
Bill Hands	39	142.0	7	10	3.49	78
Dave Goltz	32	106.1	6	4	5.25	65
Eddie Bane	23	60.1	0	5	4.92	42

==== Relief pitchers ====
Note: G = Games pitched; W = Wins; L = Losses; SV = Saves; ERA = Earned run average; SO = Strikeouts

Player	G	W	L	SV	ERA	SO
Ray Corbin	51	8	5	14	3.03	83
Bill Campbell	28	3	3	7	3.14	42
Ken Sanders	27	2	4	8	6.09	19
Vic Albury	14	1	0	0	2.70	13
Jim Strickland	7	0	1	0	11.81	6

== Awards and honors ==
All-Star Game

- Rod Carew, Second Base, Starter
- Bert Blyleven, Pitcher, Reserve

== Farm system ==
Level	Team	League	Manager
AAA	Tacoma Twins	Pacific Coast League	Kerby Farrell
AA	Orlando Twins	Southern League	Harry Warner
A	Lynchburg Twins	Carolina League	Dick Phillips
A	Wisconsin Rapids Twins	Midwest League	Johnny Goryl
A-Short Season	Geneva Twins	New York–Penn League	Fred Waters

LEAGUE CHAMPIONS: Wisconsin Rapids
