= 1974 Minnesota Twins season =

1974 Minnesota Twins
- League: American League
- Division: West
- Ballpark: Metropolitan Stadium
- City: Bloomington, Minnesota
- Owners: Calvin Griffith (majority owner, with Thelma Griffith Haynes)
- General managers: Calvin Griffith
- Managers: Frank Quilici
- Television: WCCO-TV (Larry Calton, Ralph Fritz)
- Radio: 830 WCCO AM (Herb Carneal, Larry Calton)

The 1974 Minnesota Twins season was the 14th season for the Minnesota Twins franchise in the Twin Cities of Minnesota, their 14th season at Metropolitan Stadium and the 74th overall in the American League. The Twins finished 82–80, third in the American League West.

== Offseason ==
- October 14, 1973: Joe Keough was purchased by the Twins from the Chicago White Sox.
- December 3, 1973: Sergio Ferrer was drafted by the Twins from the Los Angeles Dodgers in the 1973 rule 5 draft.
- On February 11, 1974, Dick Woodson became the first player to invoke the new free agency clause, as he sought $30,000, and the Twins offered $23,000. The arbitrator sided with Woodson.

== Regular season ==
Only one Twins player made the All-Star Game, second baseman Rod Carew. Carew won his fourth AL batting title with a .364 average, and set a Minnesota record with 180 singles. Outfielder Bobby Darwin hit 25 HR and drove in 95 runs. Three pitchers had double digit wins: Bert Blyleven (17–17), Joe Decker (16–14), and Dave Goltz (10–10). Bill Campbell showed potential as a reliever, registering 19 saves and 8 relief wins.

Only 662,401 fans attended Twins games, the lowest total in the American League. It was half the number of fans that attended in the 1960s.

=== Season standings ===
AL West
Team	W	L	Pct.	GB	Home	Road
Oakland Athletics	90	72	.556	—	49‍–‍32	41‍–‍40
Texas Rangers	84	76	.525	5	42‍–‍38	42‍–‍38
Minnesota Twins	82	80	.506	8	48‍–‍33	34‍–‍47
Chicago White Sox	80	80	.500	9	46‍–‍34	34‍–‍46
Kansas City Royals	77	85	.475	13	40‍–‍41	37‍–‍44
California Angels	68	94	.420	22	36‍–‍45	32‍–‍49

=== Record vs. opponents ===
1974 American League record Sources:
Team	BAL	BOS	CAL	CWS	CLE	DET	KC	MIL	MIN	NYY	OAK	TEX
Baltimore	—	10–8	7–5	5–7	12–6	14–4	8–4	8–10	6–6	11–7	6–6	4–8
Boston	8–10	—	4–8	8–4	9–9	11–7	4–8	10–8	6–6	11–7	8–4	5–7
California	5–7	8–4	—	10–8–1	3–9	5–7	8–10	3–9	8–10	3–9	6–12	9–9
Chicago	7–5	4–8	8–10–1	—	8–4	7–5	11–7	8–4	7–11–1	4–8	7–11	9–7–1
Cleveland	6–12	9–9	9–3	4–8	—	9–9	8–4	10–8	6–6	7–11	5–7	4–8
Detroit	4–14	7–11	7–5	5–7	9–9	—	7–5	9–9	3–9	11–7	5–7	5–7
Kansas City	4–8	8–4	10–8	7–11	4–8	5–7	—	11–1	8–10	4–8	8–10	8–10
Milwaukee	10–8	8–10	9–3	4–8	8–10	9–9	1–11	—	6–6	9–9	5–7	7–5
Minnesota	6–6	6–6	10–8	11–7–1	6–6	9–3	10–8	6–6	—	4–8	5–13	9–9
New York	7–11	7–11	9–3	8–4	11–7	7–11	8–4	9–9	8–4	—	7–5	8–4
Oakland	6–6	4–8	12–6	11–7	7–5	7–5	10–8	7–5	13–5	5–7	—	8–10
Texas	8–4	7–5	9–9	7–9–1	8–4	7–5	10–8	5–7	9–9	4–8	10–8	—

=== Notable transactions ===
- May 4, 1974: Dick Woodson was traded by the Twins to the New York Yankees for Mike Pazik and cash.
- June 5, 1974: Joe Lis was purchased from the Twins by the Cleveland Indians.
- June 5, 1974: Butch Wynegar was drafted by the Twins in the 2nd round of the 1974 Major League Baseball draft.
- August 19, 1974: Jim Holt was traded by the Twins to the Oakland Athletics for Pat Bourque.

=== Roster ===
1974 Minnesota Twins
Roster
Pitchers: 20 Vic Albury; 28 Bert Blyleven; 19 Tom Burgmeier; 17 Bill Butler; 24 Bill Campbell; 23 Ray Corbin; 21 Joe Decker; 16 Danny Fife; 30 Dave Goltz; 49 Bill Hands; 31 Jim Hughes; 32 Tom Johnson; 13 Dick Woodson	Catchers: 14 Glenn Borgmann; 15 Randy Hundley; 8 Phil Roof; Infielders: 10 Pat Bourque; 29 Rod Carew; 1 Sergio Ferrer; 25 Luis Gómez; 26 Jim Holt; 10 Joe Lis; 3 Harmon Killebrew; 22 Craig Kusick; 12 Eric Soderholm; 7 Jerry Terrell; 5 Danny Thompson	Outfielders: 4 Steve Braun; 11 Steve Brye; 2 Bobby Darwin; 9 Larry Hisle; Other batters: 6 Tony Oliva	Manager: 43 Frank Quilici; Coaches: 44 Vern Morgan; 45 Buck Rodgers; 42 Ralph Rowe

== Player stats ==
= Indicates team leader

=== Batting ===
==== Starters by position ====
Note: Pos = Position; G = Games played; AB = At bats; H = Hits; Avg. = Batting average; HR = Home runs; RBI = Runs batted in

Pos	Player	G	AB	H	Avg.	HR	RBI
C	Glenn Borgmann	128	345	87	.252	3	45
1B	Craig Kusick	76	201	48	.239	8	26
2B	Rod Carew	153	599	218	.364	3	55
SS	Danny Thompson	97	264	66	.250	4	25
3B	Eric Soderholm	141	464	128	.276	10	51
LF	Steve Braun	129	453	127	.280	8	40
CF	Steve Brye	135	488	138	.283	2	41
RF	Bobby Darwin	152	575	152	.264	25	94
DH	Tony Oliva	127	459	131	.285	13	57

==== Other batters ====
Note: G = Games played; AB = At bats; H = Hits; Avg. = Batting average; HR = Home runs; RBI = Runs batted in

Player	G	AB	H	Avg.	HR	RBI
Larry Hisle	143	510	146	.286	19	79
Harmon Killebrew	122	333	74	.222	13	54
Jerry Terrell	116	229	56	.245	0	19
Jim Holt	79	197	50	.254	0	16
Luis Gómez	82	168	35	.208	0	3
Phil Roof	44	97	19	.196	2	13
Randy Hundley	32	88	17	.193	0	3
Pat Bourque	23	64	14	.219	1	8
Sergio Ferrer	24	57	16	.281	0	0
Joe Lis	24	41	8	.195	0	3

=== Pitching ===
==== Starting pitchers ====
Note: G = Games pitched; IP = Innings pitched; W = Wins; L = Losses; ERA = Earned run average; SO = Strikeouts

Player	G	IP	W	L	ERA	SO
Bert Blyleven	37	281.0	17	17	2.66	249
Joe Decker	37	248.2	16	14	3.29	158
Dave Goltz	28	174.1	10	10	3.25	89
Dick Woodson	5	27.0	1	1	4.33	12
Jim Hughes	2	10.1	0	2	5.23	8

==== Other pitchers ====
Note: G = Games pitched; IP = Innings pitched; W = Wins; L = Losses; ERA = Earned run average; SO = Strikeouts

Player	G	IP	W	L	ERA	SO
Vic Albury	32	164.0	8	9	4.12	85
Bill Hands	35	115.1	4	5	4.45	74
Ray Corbin	29	112.1	7	6	5.29	50
Bill Butler	26	98.2	4	6	4.10	79

==== Relief pitchers ====
Note: G = Games pitched; W = Wins; L = Losses; SV = Saves; ERA = Earned run average; SO = Strikeouts

Player	G	W	L	SV	ERA	SO
Bill Campbell	63	8	7	19	2.62	89
Tom Burgmeier	50	5	3	4	4.52	34
Tom Johnson	4	2	0	1	0.00	4
Danny Fife	4	0	0	0	17.36	3

== Awards and honors ==
- Danny Thompson, Hutch Award

All-Star Game

- Rod Carew, Second Base, Starter

== Farm system ==
Level	Team	League	Manager
AAA	Tacoma Twins	Pacific Coast League	Cal Ermer
AA	Orlando Twins	Southern League	Dick Phillips
A	Lynchburg Twins	Carolina League	Harry Warner
A	Wisconsin Rapids Twins	Midwest League	Johnny Goryl
Rookie	Elizabethton Twins	Appalachian League	Bob Butler
