= 1971 Minnesota Twins season =

1971 Minnesota Twins
- League: American League
- Division: West
- Ballpark: Metropolitan Stadium
- City: Bloomington, Minnesota
- Record: 74–86 (.463)
- Divisional place: 5th
- Owners: Calvin Griffith (majority owner, with Thelma Griffith Haynes)
- General managers: Calvin Griffith
- Managers: Bill Rigney
- Television: WTCN-TV (Halsey Hall, Frank Buetel, Bob Allison)
- Radio: 830 WCCO AM (Herb Carneal, Halsey Hall, Ray Christensen)

The 1971 Minnesota Twins season was the 11th season for the Minnesota Twins franchise in the Twin Cities of Minnesota, their 11th season at Metropolitan Stadium and the 71st overall in the American League.

The Twins finished 74–86, fifth in the American League West. 940,858 fans attended Twins games, the fifth-highest total in the American League, the first time the Twins failed to attract over one million fans since moving to Minnesota.

== Regular season ==
Five Twins made the All-Star Game: first baseman Harmon Killebrew, second baseman Rod Carew, shortstop Leo Cárdenas, outfielder Tony Oliva, and pitcher Jim Perry.

On August 10, at Metropolitan Stadium, slugger Harmon Killebrew hit his 500th career home run, in the first inning off the Baltimore Orioles' Mike Cuellar. He followed that in the sixth inning with his 501st, also off Cuellar.

Lead off batter César Tovar led the AL with 204 hits and was second with 94 runs. Tony Oliva won his third batting title with a .337 average and led the AL with a .546 slugging percentage. Harmon Killebrew hit 28 HR and 119 RBI. Rod Carew hit .307.

Jim Perry (17–17), Bert Blyleven (16–15), and Jim Kaat (13–14) were the Twins' best pitchers. Kaat won his tenth Gold Glove Award.

Shortstop Leo Cárdenas topped the AL with a .985 fielding percentage—the highest for an American League shortstop since records began in 1901.

=== Season standings ===
AL West
| Team | W | L | Pct. | GB | Home | Road |
|---|---|---|---|---|---|---|
| Oakland Athletics | 101 | 60 | .627 | — | 46‍–‍35 | 55‍–‍25 |
| Kansas City Royals | 85 | 76 | .528 | 16 | 44‍–‍37 | 41‍–‍39 |
| Chicago White Sox | 79 | 83 | .488 | 22½ | 39‍–‍42 | 40‍–‍41 |
| California Angels | 76 | 86 | .469 | 25½ | 35‍–‍46 | 41‍–‍40 |
| Minnesota Twins | 74 | 86 | .463 | 26½ | 37‍–‍42 | 37‍–‍44 |
| Milwaukee Brewers | 69 | 92 | .429 | 32 | 34‍–‍48 | 35‍–‍44 |

=== Record vs. opponents ===
1971 American League record Sources:
| Team | BAL | BOS | CAL | CWS | CLE | DET | KC | MIL | MIN | NYY | OAK | WAS |
|---|---|---|---|---|---|---|---|---|---|---|---|---|
| Baltimore | — | 9–9 | 7–5 | 8–4 | 13–5 | 8–10 | 6–5 | 9–3 | 10–2 | 11–7 | 7–4 | 13–3 |
| Boston | 9–9 | — | 6–6 | 10–2 | 11–7 | 12–6 | 1–11 | 6–6 | 8–4 | 7–11 | 3–9 | 12–6 |
| California | 5–7 | 6–6 | — | 8–10 | 8–4 | 6–6 | 8–10 | 6–12 | 12–6 | 6–6 | 7–11 | 4–8 |
| Chicago | 4–8 | 2–10 | 10–8 | — | 3–9 | 7–5 | 9–9 | 11–7 | 7–11 | 5–7 | 11–7 | 10–2 |
| Cleveland | 5–13 | 7–11 | 4–8 | 9–3 | — | 6–12 | 2–10 | 4–8 | 4–8 | 8–10 | 4–8 | 7–11 |
| Detroit | 10–8 | 6–12 | 6–6 | 5–7 | 12–6 | — | 8–4 | 10–2 | 6–6 | 10–8 | 4–8 | 14–4 |
| Kansas City | 5–6 | 11–1 | 10–8 | 9–9 | 10–2 | 4–8 | — | 8–10 | 9–9 | 5–7 | 5–13 | 9–3 |
| Milwaukee | 3–9 | 6–6 | 12–6 | 7–11 | 8–4 | 2–10 | 10–8 | — | 10–7 | 2–10 | 3–15 | 6–6 |
| Minnesota | 2–10 | 4–8 | 6–12 | 11–7 | 8–4 | 6–6 | 9–9 | 7–10 | — | 8–4 | 8–10 | 5–6 |
| New York | 7–11 | 11–7 | 6–6 | 7–5 | 10–8 | 8–10 | 7–5 | 10–2 | 4–8 | — | 5–7 | 7–11 |
| Oakland | 4–7 | 9–3 | 11–7 | 7–11 | 8–4 | 8–4 | 13–5 | 15–3 | 10–8 | 7–5 | — | 9–3 |
| Washington | 3–13 | 6–12 | 8–4 | 2–10 | 11–7 | 4–14 | 3–9 | 6–6 | 6–5 | 11–7 | 3–9 | — |

=== Notable transactions ===
- April 9, 1971: Dave Boswell was released by the Twins.
- June 8, 1971: 1971 Major League Baseball draft
  - Dave Edwards was drafted by the Twins in the 7th round.
  - Future NFL quarterback Joe Theismann was drafted by the Twins in the 39th round.
  - Glenn Borgmann was drafted by the Twins in the 1st round of the secondary phase.
- July 8, 1971: Paul Ratliff was traded by the Twins to the Milwaukee Brewers for Phil Roof.

=== Roster ===
1971 Minnesota Twins
Roster
| Pitchers: 24 Steve Barber; 28 Bert Blyleven; 19 Sal Campisi; 23 Ray Corbin; 16 Bob Gebhard; 21 Tom Hall; 33,24 Pete Hamm; 30 Hal Haydel; 36 Jim Kaat; 32 Steve Luebber; 16 Ron Perranoski; 31 Jim Perry; 19 Jim Strickland; 35 Stan Williams | Catchers: 25 Rick Dempsey; 15 George Mitterwald; 8 Paul Ratliff; 8 Phil Roof; 22 Tom Tischinski; Infielders: 4 Steve Braun; 17 Leo Cárdenas; 29 Rod Carew; 3 Harmon Killebrew; 20 Rich Reese; 10 Rick Renick; 1 Eric Soderholm; 5 Danny Thompson | Outfielders: 11 Brant Alyea; 37 Steve Brye; 26 Jim Holt; 9 Charlie Manuel; 7 Jim Nettles; 6 Tony Oliva; 7 Paul Powell; 24 George Thomas; 12 César Tovar | Manager: 18 Bill Rigney; Coaches: 2 Frankie Crosetti; 46 Marv Grissom; 44 Vern Morgan; 43 Frank Quilici; 45 Buck Rodgers |

== Player stats ==
| = Indicates team leader |

=== Batting ===
==== Starters by position ====
Note: Pos = Position; G = Games played; AB = At bats; H = Hits; Avg. = Batting average; HR = Home runs; RBI = Runs batted in

| Pos | Player | G | AB | H | Avg. | HR | RBI |
|---|---|---|---|---|---|---|---|
| C | George Mitterwald | 125 | 388 | 97 | .250 | 13 | 44 |
| 1B | Harmon Killebrew | 147 | 500 | 127 | .254 | 28 | 119 |
| 2B | Rod Carew | 147 | 577 | 177 | .307 | 2 | 48 |
| SS | Leo Cárdenas | 153 | 554 | 146 | .264 | 18 | 75 |
| 3B | Steve Braun | 128 | 343 | 87 | .254 | 5 | 35 |
| LF | César Tovar | 157 | 657 | 204 | .311 | 1 | 45 |
| CF | Jim Holt | 126 | 340 | 88 | .259 | 1 | 29 |
| RF | Tony Oliva | 126 | 487 | 164 | .337 | 22 | 81 |

==== Other batters ====
Note: G = Games played; AB = At bats; H = Hits; Avg. = Batting average; HR = Home runs; RBI = Runs batted in

| Player | G | AB | H | Avg. | HR | RBI |
|---|---|---|---|---|---|---|
| Rich Reese | 120 | 329 | 72 | .219 | 10 | 39 |
| Jim Nettles | 70 | 168 | 42 | .250 | 6 | 24 |
| Brant Alyea | 79 | 158 | 28 | .177 | 2 | 15 |
| Steve Brye | 28 | 107 | 24 | .224 | 3 | 11 |
| Phil Roof | 31 | 87 | 21 | .241 | 0 | 6 |
| Eric Soderholm | 21 | 64 | 10 | .156 | 1 | 4 |
| Danny Thompson | 48 | 57 | 15 | .263 | 0 | 7 |
| Rick Renick | 27 | 45 | 10 | .222 | 1 | 8 |
| Paul Ratliff | 21 | 44 | 7 | .159 | 2 | 6 |
| Paul Powell | 20 | 31 | 5 | .161 | 1 | 2 |
| George Thomas | 23 | 30 | 8 | .267 | 0 | 2 |
| Tom Tischinski | 21 | 23 | 3 | .130 | 0 | 2 |
| Charlie Manuel | 18 | 16 | 2 | .125 | 0 | 1 |
| Rick Dempsey | 6 | 13 | 4 | .308 | 0 | 0 |

=== Pitching ===
==== Starting pitchers ====
Note: G = Games pitched; IP = Innings pitched; W = Wins; L = Losses; ERA = Earned run average; SO = Strikeouts

| Player | G | IP | W | L | ERA | SO |
|---|---|---|---|---|---|---|
| Bert Blyleven | 38 | 278.1 | 16 | 15 | 2.81 | 224 |
| Jim Perry | 40 | 270.0 | 17 | 17 | 4.23 | 126 |
| Jim Kaat | 39 | 260.1 | 13 | 14 | 3.32 | 137 |

==== Other pitchers ====
Note: G = Games pitched; IP = Innings pitched; W = Wins; L = Losses; ERA = Earned run average; SO = Strikeouts

| Player | G | IP | W | L | ERA | SO |
|---|---|---|---|---|---|---|
| Ray Corbin | 52 | 140.1 | 8 | 11 | 4.10 | 83 |
| Tom Hall | 48 | 129.2 | 4 | 7 | 3.33 | 137 |
| Steve Luebber | 18 | 68.0 | 2 | 5 | 5.03 | 35 |
| Pete Hamm | 13 | 44.0 | 2 | 4 | 6.75 | 16 |
| Steve Barber | 4 | 11.2 | 1 | 0 | 6.17 | 4 |

Tom Hall led the Twins in saves with 9.

==== Relief pitchers ====
Note: G = Games pitched; W = Wins; L = Losses; SV = Saves; ERA = Earned run average; SO = Strikeouts

| Player | G | W | L | SV | ERA | SO |
|---|---|---|---|---|---|---|
| Ron Perranoski | 36 | 1 | 4 | 5 | 6.75 | 21 |
| Stan Williams | 46 | 4 | 5 | 4 | 4.15 | 47 |
| Hal Haydel | 31 | 4 | 2 | 1 | 4.28 | 29 |
| Jim Strickland | 24 | 1 | 0 | 1 | 1.44 | 21 |
| Bob Gebhard | 17 | 1 | 2 | 0 | 3.00 | 13 |
| Sal Campisi | 6 | 0 | 0 | 0 | 4.15 | 2 |

== Awards and honors ==
- Harmon Killebrew, Lou Gehrig Award

All-Star Game

- Rod Carew, Second Base, Starter
- Harmon Killebrew, First Base, Reserve
- Jim Perry, Pitcher, Reserve
- Tony Olivia, Outfield, Injured, Did not play

== Farm system ==
| Level | Team | League | Manager |
|---|---|---|---|
| AAA | Portland Beavers | Pacific Coast League | Ralph Rowe |
| AA | Charlotte Hornets | Southern League | Harry Warner |
| A | Lynchburg Twins | Carolina League | Johnny Goryl |
| A | Orlando Twins | Florida State League | Jackie Ferrell |
| A | Wisconsin Rapids Twins | Midwest League | Weldon Bowlin |
| A-Short Season | Auburn Twins | New York–Penn League | Boyd Coffie |
| A-Short Season | St. Cloud Rox | Northern League | Ken Staples |
| Rookie | GCL Twins | Gulf Coast League | Fred Waters |

LEAGUE CHAMPIONS: Charlotte, St. Cloud
