= 1972 Minnesota Twins season =

1972 Minnesota Twins
- League: American League
- Division: West
- Ballpark: Metropolitan Stadium
- City: Bloomington, Minnesota
- Record: 77–77 (.500)
- Divisional place: 3rd
- Owners: Calvin Griffith (majority owner, with Thelma Griffith Haynes)
- General managers: Calvin Griffith
- Managers: Bill Rigney, Frank Quilici
- Television: WTCN-TV (Halsey Hall, Frank Buetel, Lynn Faris)
- Radio: 830 WCCO AM (Herb Carneal, Halsey Hall, Ray Christensen)

The 1972 Minnesota Twins season was the 12th season for the Minnesota Twins franchise in the Twin Cities of Minnesota, their 12th season at Metropolitan Stadium and the 72nd overall in the American League. The Twins finished 77–77, third in the American League West.

== Offseason ==
- October 22, 1971: Paul Powell was traded by the Twins to the Los Angeles Dodgers for Bobby Darwin.
- November 29, 1971: Brant Alyea was drafted from the Twins by the Oakland Athletics in the 1971 rule 5 draft.

== Regular season ==
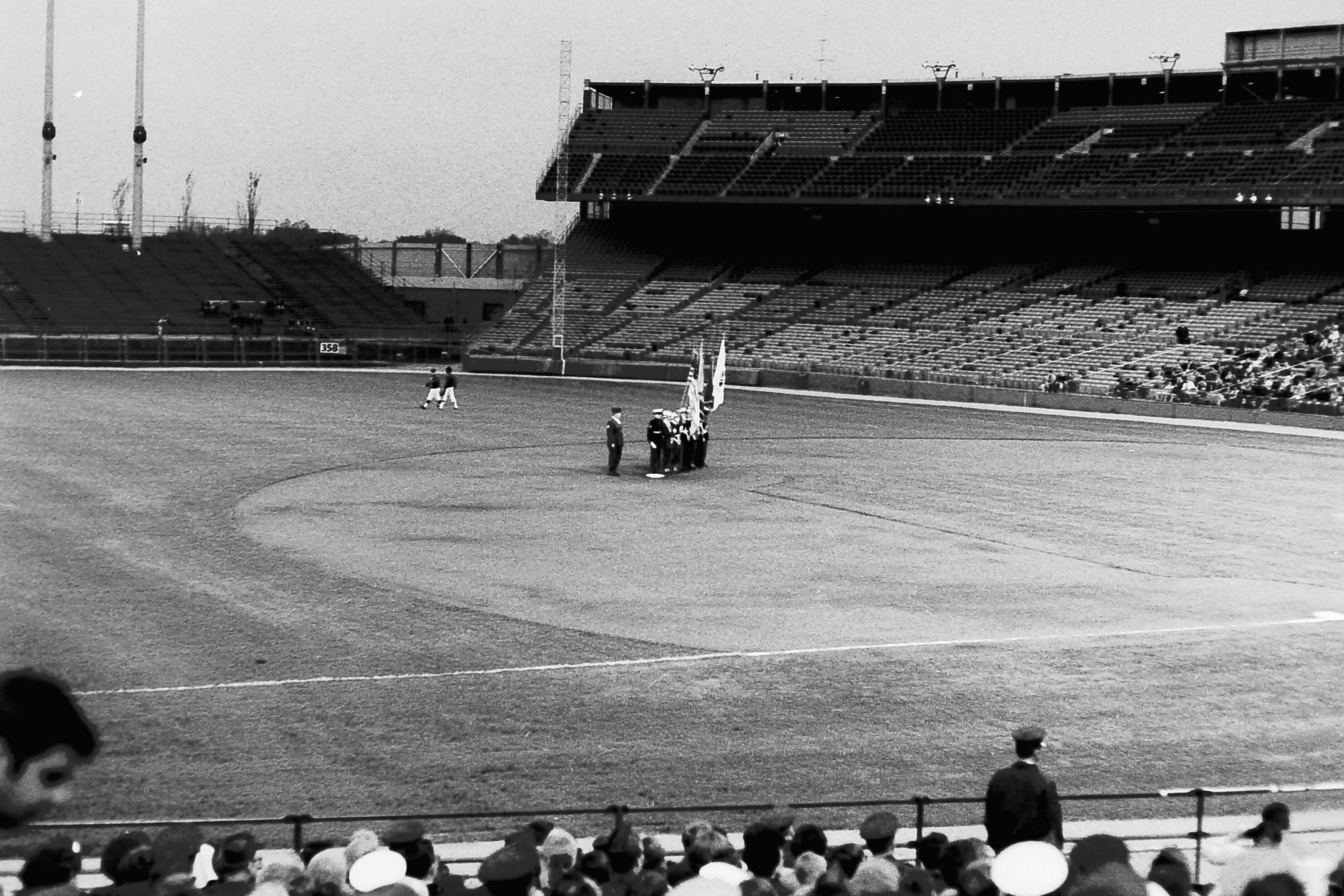
Armed Forces Day at Metropolitan Stadium, 1972.

On May 12, in a twenty-two inning match which concluded a day later, Danny Thompson went 0 for 10 with a sacrifice bunt, dropping his batting average 39 points over one game. He and César Tovar set a team record with their eleven plate appearances.

After a slow start, manager Bill Rigney was replaced by Frank Quilici in early July.

On July 9, Rich Reese hit his third pinch-hit grand slam home run, tying a major league record in doing so.

Rothsay, Minnesota, native Dave Goltz made his major league debut on July 18 – he is the first Minnesotan drafted by the Minnesota Twins to make the big league club. He gave up one hit in 3 2/3 innings.

Only one Twin made the All-Star Game: second baseman Rod Carew.

On July 31, pitcher Bert Blyleven gave up two inside-the-park home runs, both to the Chicago White Sox Dick Allen. When this next occurs in the major leagues (October 4, 1986), Blyleven is again on the mound. But the feat is accomplished this time by his Minnesota teammate Greg Gagne.

When César Tovar hit for the cycle on September 19, he finished with a game-ending home run. The only other player to do that in history was Ken Boyer (1961). In later years, and after such a hit became known as a "walk-off home run", the feat was duplicated by George Brett (1979), Dwight Evans (1984), and Carlos González (2010). Tovar is just the second Twin to hit for the cycle, after Rod Carew in 1970; eight more Twins will do so by 2009.

Carew won his second AL batting title with a .318 average, but did not hit any home runs during the season. Previously, Zach Wheat was the last player to accomplish this feat when he won the 1918 NL batting title with the Brooklyn Dodgers. Bobby Darwin showed potential as a hitter with 22 HR and 80 RBI, but that did not make up for age and injuries taking their toll on other players. (Those numbers were also suppressed by his Twins-record 145 strikeouts.) Harmon Killebrew hit 26 HR (4th in the league) but drove in only 75 runs. Tony Oliva's bad knees limited him to only 10 games. César Tovar led the team with 86 runs scored. Four pitchers had double digit wins: Bert Blyleven (17–17), Dick Woodson (14–14), Jim Perry (13–16), and Jim Kaat (10–2). Kaat also won his 11th Gold Glove Award.

797,901 fans attended Twins games, the seventh highest total in the American League. It was almost half the number of fans that had attended just a few seasons earlier.

=== Season standings ===
AL West
Team	W	L	Pct.	GB	Home	Road
Oakland Athletics	93	62	.600	—	48‍–‍29	45‍–‍33
Chicago White Sox	87	67	.565	5½	55‍–‍23	32‍–‍44
Minnesota Twins	77	77	.500	15½	42‍–‍32	35‍–‍45
Kansas City Royals	76	78	.494	16½	44‍–‍33	32‍–‍45
California Angels	75	80	.484	18	44‍–‍36	31‍–‍44
Texas Rangers	54	100	.351	38½	31‍–‍46	23‍–‍54

=== Record vs. opponents ===
1972 American League records Sources:
Team	BAL	BOS	CAL	CWS	CLE	DET	KC	MIL	MIN	NYY	OAK	TEX
Baltimore	—	7–11	6–6	8–4	8–10	10–8	6–6	10–5	6–6	7–6	6–6	6–6
Boston	11–7	—	8–4	6–6	8–7	5–9	6–6	11–7	4–8	9–9	9–3	8–4
California	6–6	4–8	—	7–11	8–4	5–7	9–6	7–5	7–8	4–8	8–10	10–7
Chicago	4–8	6–6	11–7	—	8–4	5–7	8–9	9–3	8–6	7–5	7–8	14–4
Cleveland	10–8	7–8	4–8	4–8	—	10–8	6–6	5–10	8–4	7–11	2–10	9–3
Detroit	8–10	9–5	7–5	7–5	8–10	—	7–5	10–8	9–3	7–9	4–8	10–2
Kansas City	6–6	6–6	6–9	9–8	6–6	5–7	—	7–5	9–9	7–5	7–11	8–6
Milwaukee	5–10	7–11	5–7	3–9	10–5	8–10	5–7	—	4–8	9–9	4–8	5–7
Minnesota	6–6	8–4	8–7	6–8	4–8	3–9	9–9	8–4	—	6–6	8–9	11–7
New York	6–7	9–9	8–4	5–7	11–7	9–7	5–7	9–9	6–6	—	3–9	8–4
Oakland	6–6	3–9	10–8	8–7	10–2	8–4	11–7	8–4	9–8	9–3	—	11–4
Texas	6–6	4–8	7–10	4–14	3–9	2–10	6–8	7–5	7–11	4–8	4–11	—

=== Notable transactions ===
- May 12, 1972: Sal Butera was signed by the Twins as an amateur free agent.
- June 6, 1972: 1972 Major League Baseball draft
  - Willie Norwood was drafted by the Twins in the 3rd round.
  - Lyman Bostock was drafted by the Twins in the 26th round.

=== Roster ===
1972 Minnesota Twins
Roster
Pitchers: 28 Bert Blyleven; 23 Ray Corbin; 16 Bob Gebhard; 30 Dave Goltz; 21 Wayne Granger; 36 Jim Kaat; 17 Dave LaRoche; 32 Steve Luebber; 22 Tom Norton; 31 Jim Perry; 19 Jim Strickland; 13 Dick Woodson	Catchers: 24 Glenn Borgmann; 25 Rick Dempsey; 15 George Mitterwald; 8 Phil Roof; Infielders: 4 Steve Braun; 29 Rod Carew; 27 Bucky Guth; 3 Harmon Killebrew; 14 Dan Monzon; 20 Rich Reese; 1 Eric Soderholm; 5 Danny Thompson	Outfielders: 25 Mike Adams; 11 Steve Brye; 2 Bobby Darwin; 26 Jim Holt; 9 Charlie Manuel; 7 Jim Nettles; 6 Tony Oliva; 10 Rick Renick; 12 César Tovar	Manager: 43 Frank Quilici; 18 Bill Rigney; Coaches: 44 Vern Morgan; 43 Frank Quilici; 45 Buck Rodgers; 42 Ralph Rowe; 46 Al Worthington

== Player stats ==
= Indicates team leader

= Indicates league leader

=== Batting ===
==== Starters by position ====
Note: Pos = Position; G = Games played; AB = At bats; H = Hits; Avg. = Batting average; HR = Home runs; RBI = Runs batted in

Pos	Player	G	AB	H	Avg.	HR	RBI
C	Glenn Borgmann	56	175	41	.234	3	14
1B	Harmon Killebrew	139	433	100	.231	26	74
2B	Rod Carew	142	535	170	.318	0	51
SS	Danny Thompson	144	573	158	.276	4	48
3B	Eric Soderholm	93	287	54	.188	13	39
LF	Steve Brye	100	253	61	.241	0	12
CF	Bobby Darwin	145	513	137	.267	22	80
RF	César Tovar	141	548	145	.265	2	31

==== Other batters ====
Note: G = Games played; AB = At bats; H = Hits; Avg. = Batting average; HR = Home runs; RBI = Runs batted in

Player	G	AB	H	Avg.	HR	RBI
Steve Braun	121	402	116	.289	2	50
Jim Nettles	102	235	48	.204	4	15
Rich Reese	132	197	43	.218	5	26
George Mitterwald	64	163	30	.184	1	8
Phil Roof	61	146	30	.205	3	12
Charlie Manuel	63	122	25	.205	1	8
Rick Renick	55	93	16	.172	4	8
Dan Monzon	55	55	15	.273	0	5
Rick Dempsey	25	40	8	.200	0	0
Tony Oliva	10	28	9	.321	0	1
Jim Holt	10	27	12	.444	1	6
Mike Adams	3	6	2	.333	0	0
Bucky Guth	3	3	0	.000	0	0

=== Pitching ===
==== Starting pitchers ====
Note: G = Games pitched; IP = Innings pitched; W = Wins; L = Losses; ERA = Earned run average; SO = Strikeouts

Player	G	IP	W	L	ERA	SO
Bert Blyleven	39	287.1	17	17	2.73	228
Dick Woodson	36	251.2	14	14	2.72	150
Jim Perry	35	217.2	13	16	3.35	85
Jim Kaat	15	113.1	10	2	2.06	64
Dave Goltz	15	91.0	3	3	2.67	38

==== Other pitchers ====
Note: G = Games pitched; IP = Innings pitched; W = Wins; L = Losses; ERA = Earned run average; SO = Strikeouts

Player	G	IP	W	L	ERA	SO
Ray Corbin	31	161.2	8	9	2.62	83

==== Relief pitchers ====
Note: G = Games pitched; W = Wins; L = Losses; SV = Saves; ERA = Earned run average; SO = Strikeouts

Player	G	W	L	SV	ERA	SO
Wayne Granger	63	4	6	19	3.01	45
Dave LaRoche	62	5	7	10	2.83	79
Jim Strickland	25	3	1	3	2.50	30
Tom Norton	21	0	1	0	2.78	22
Bob Gebhard	13	0	1	1	8.57	13
Steve Luebber	2	0	0	0	0.00	1

== Awards and honors ==
All-Star Game

- Rod Carew, Second Base Starter

== Farm system ==
Level	Team	League	Manager
AAA	Tacoma Twins	Pacific Coast League	Harry Warner
AA	Charlotte Hornets	Southern League	Johnny Goryl
A	Lynchburg Twins	Carolina League	Kerby Farrell
A	Orlando Twins	Florida State League	Early Wynn
A	Wisconsin Rapids Twins	Midwest League	Jay Ward
A	Charlotte Twins	Western Carolinas League	Bob Sadowski
Rookie	Melbourne Twins	Florida East Coast League	Fred Waters
