= List of Minnesota Twins broadcasters =

The Minnesota Twins baseball team have had many broadcasters in their history in Minnesota. Here is a list of the people who have been a part of bringing the Twins to the people of Minnesota.

== Radio ==
Year	Affiliate	Broadcasters
2025	WCCO	Gladden, Atteberry
2024	WCCO	Gladden, Atteberry
2023	WCCO	Provus, Gladden, Atteberry
2022	WCCO	Provus, Gladden, Atteberry
2021	WCCO	Provus, Gladden, Atteberry
2020	WCCO	Provus, Gladden, Atteberry
2019	WCCO	Provus, Gladden, Atteberry
2018	WCCO	Provus, Gladden, Atteberry
2017	KQGO	Cory Provus, Gladden, Atteberry
2016	KTWN-FM	Cory Provus, Gladden, Atteberry
2015	KTWN-FM	Cory Provus, Gladden, Atteberry
2014	KTWN-FM	Cory Provus, Gladden, Atteberry
2013	KTWN-FM	Cory Provus, Gladden, Atteberry
2012	KSTP	Cory Provus, Gladden, Atteberry
2011	KSTP	Gordon, Gladden, Morris, Atteberry, Ted Robinson, Bob Kurtz
2010	KSTP	Gordon, Gladden, Morris, Kris Atteberry
2009	KSTP	Gordon, Gladden, Morris, Kris Atteberry
2008	KSTP	Gordon, Gladden, Morris, Kris Atteberry
2007	KSTP	Gordon, Gladden, Morris, Kris Atteberry
2006	WCCO	Carneal, Gordon, Gladden, Jack Morris
2005	WCCO	Carneal, Gordon, Dan Gladden
2004	WCCO	Carneal, Gordon, Dan Gladden
2003	WCCO	Carneal, Gordon, Dan Gladden
2002	WCCO	Carneal, Gordon, Dan Gladden
2001	WCCO	Carneal, Gordon, Dan Gladden
2000	WCCO	Carneal, Gordon, Dan Gladden
1999	WCCO	Carneal, Gordon, Anthony LaPanta
1998	WCCO	Carneal, Gordon, Ryan Lefebvre
1997	WCCO	Carneal, Gordon, Ryan Lefebvre
1996	WCCO	Carneal, Gordon, Ryan Lefebvre
1995	WCCO	Carneal, Gordon
1994	WCCO	Carneal, Gordon, Jim Powell
1993	WCCO	Carneal, Gordon, Jim Powell
1992	WCCO	Carneal, John Gordon
1991	WCCO	Carneal, John Gordon
1990	WCCO	Carneal, John Gordon
1989	WCCO	Carneal, John Gordon
1988	WCCO	Carneal, John Gordon
1987	WCCO	Carneal, John Gordon
1986	WCCO	Carneal, Joe Angel
1985	WCCO	Carneal, Joe Angel
1984	WCCO	Carneal, Joe Angel
1983	WCCO	Carneal, Tim Moreland, Ron Weber
1982	WCCO	Carneal, Frank Quilici
1981	WCCO	Carneal, Frank Quilici
1980	WCCO	Carneal, Frank Quilici
1979	WCCO	Carneal, Joe McConnell
1978	WCCO	Carneal, Joe McConnell
1977	WCCO	Carneal, Frank Quilici
1976	WCCO	Carneal, Frank Quilici
1975	WCCO	Carneal, Larry Calton
1974	WCCO	Carneal, Larry Calton
1973	WCCO	Carneal, Christensen
1972	WCCO	Carneal, Ray Christensen, Hall
1971	WCCO	Carneal, Ray Christensen, Hall
1970	WCCO	Carneal, Ray Christensen, Hall
1969	WCCO	Carneal, Merle Harmon, Hall
1968	WCCO	Carneal, Merle Harmon, Hall
1967	WCCO	Carneal, Merle Harmon, Hall
1966	WCCO	Scott, Herb Carneal, Hall
1965	WCCO	Scott, Herb Carneal, Hall
1964	WCCO	Scott, Herb Carneal, Hall
1963	WCCO	Scott, Herb Carneal, Hall
1962	WCCO	Scott, Herb Carneal, Hall
1961	WCCO	Ray Scott, Bob Wolff, Halsey Hall

== Television ==
Year	Affiliate	Broadcasters
2025	Twins.tv KMSP-TV and Gray Media (limited simulcasts)	Morneau, Provus
2024	Bally Sports North	Smalley, Morneau, LaPanta, Hawkins, Perkins, Provus
2023	Bally Sports North	Bremer, Smalley, Morneau, LaPanta, Hawkins, Perkins, Cory Provus
2022	Bally Sports North	Bremer, Kaat, Smalley, Morneau, LaPanta, Hawkins, Glen Perkins
2021	Bally Sports North	Bremer, Blyleven, Morris, Smalley, Morneau, Anthony LaPanta, LaTroy Hawkins
2020	Fox Sports North	Bremer, Blyleven, Jack Morris, Roy Smalley, Justin Morneau
2019	Fox Sports North	Bremer, Blyleven, Jack Morris, Roy Smalley, Justin Morneau
2018	Fox Sports North	Bremer, Blyleven, Jack Morris, Roy Smalley, Justin Morneau
2017	Fox Sports North	Bremer, Blyleven, Jack Morris, Roy Smalley, Justin Morneau
2016	Fox Sports North	Bremer, Blyleven, Jack Morris, Roy Smalley, Justin Morneau
2015	Fox Sports North	Bremer, Blyleven, Jack Morris, Roy Smalley, Justin Morneau
2014	Fox Sports North	Bremer, Blyleven, Jack Morris, Roy Smalley, Justin Morneau
2013	Fox Sports North	Bremer, Blyleven, Ron Coomer
2012	Fox Sports North	Bremer, Blyleven, Ron Coomer
2011	Fox Sports North	Bremer, Blyleven
2010	Fox Sports North/WFTC	Bremer, Blyleven
2009	Fox Sports North/WFTC	Bremer, Blyleven
2008	Fox Sports North/WFTC	Bremer, Blyleven
2007	Fox Sports North/WFTC	Bremer, Blyleven
2006	Fox Sports North/WFTC	Bremer, Blyleven
2005	Fox Sports North/WFTC	Bremer, Blyleven
2004	Victory Sports One/Fox Sports North/KSTC-TV	Bremer, Blyleven
2003	Fox Sports North	Bremer, Blyleven
2002	Fox Sports North	Bremer, Blyleven
2001	KMSP-TV/MSC	Bremer, Blyleven
2000	KMSP-TV/MSC	Bremer, Blyleven
1999	KMSP-TV/MSC	Bremer, Blyleven, Paul Molitor
1998	KMSP-TV/MSC	Bremer, Blyleven, Lefebvre
1997	WCCO-TV/MSC	Bremer, Blyleven, Lefebvre
1996	WCCO-TV/MSC	Bremer, John, Blyleven, Ryan Lefebvre
1995	WCCO-TV/MSC	Bremer, John, Hartman, Gene Larkin, Bert Blyleven, Kent Hrbek
1994	WCCO-TV/MSC	Bremer, Al Newman, Tommy John, Bob Carpenter, Chad Hartman
1993	WCCO-TV/MSC	Kaat, Bremer, George Frazier, Mee
1992	WCCO-TV/MSC	Robinson, Kaat, Bremer, Tom Mee
1991	WCCO-TV/MSC	Robinson, Kaat, Bremer
1990	WCCO-TV/MSC	Robinson, Kaat, Bremer
1989	WCCO-TV/MSC	Robinson, Kaat, Bremer
1988	TWINSVISION	Bremer, Killebrew
1988	KMSP-TV/MSC	Robinson, Jim Kaat
1987	TWINSVISION	Bremer, Frank Quilici
1987	KMSP-TV	Killebrew, John Rooney
1986	KMSP-TV	Kurtz, Killebrew
1985	Spectrum Sports	Bremer, Killebrew
1985	KMSP-TV	Kurtz, Killebrew
1984	Spectrum Sports	Bremer, Killebrew
1984	KMSP-TV	Kurtz, Ted Robinson
1983	Spectrum Sports	Dick Bremer, Pat Hughes
1983	KMSP-TV	Bob Kurtz, Larry Osterman
1983	KMSP-TV	Bob Kurtz, Larry Osterman
1982	KMSP-TV	Bob Kurtz, Larry Osterman
1981	KMSP-TV	Bob Kurtz, Larry Osterman
1980	KMSP-TV	Bob Kurtz, Larry Osterman
1979	KMSP-TV	Bob Kurtz, Larry Osterman
1978	WTCN-TV	Boyle, Harmon Killebrew
1977	WTCN-TV	Boyle, Harmon Killebrew
1976	WTCN-TV	Boyle, Harmon Killebrew
1975	WTCN-TV	Scott, Calton, Joe Boyle
1974	WCCO-TV	Fritz, Larry Calton
1973	WCCO-TV	Scott, Ralph Jon Fritz
1972	WTCN-TV	Buetel, Lynn Faris, Hall
1971	WTCN-TV	Buetel, Bob Allison, Hall
1970	WTCN-TV	Carneal, Frank Buetel, Hall
1969	WTCN-TV	Carneal, Merle Harmon, Hall
1968	WTCN-TV	Carneal, Merle Harmon, Hall
1967	WTCN-TV	Carneal, Merle Harmon, Hall
1966	WTCN-TV	Scott, Herb Carneal, Hall
1965	WTCN-TV	Scott, Herb Carneal, Hall
1964	WTCN-TV	Scott, Herb Carneal, Hall
1963	WTCN-TV	Scott, Herb Carneal, Hall
1962	WTCN-TV	Scott, Herb Carneal, Hall
1961	WTCN-TV	Ray Scott, Bob Wolff, Halsey Hall
