= List of Minnesota Twins Opening Day starting pitchers =

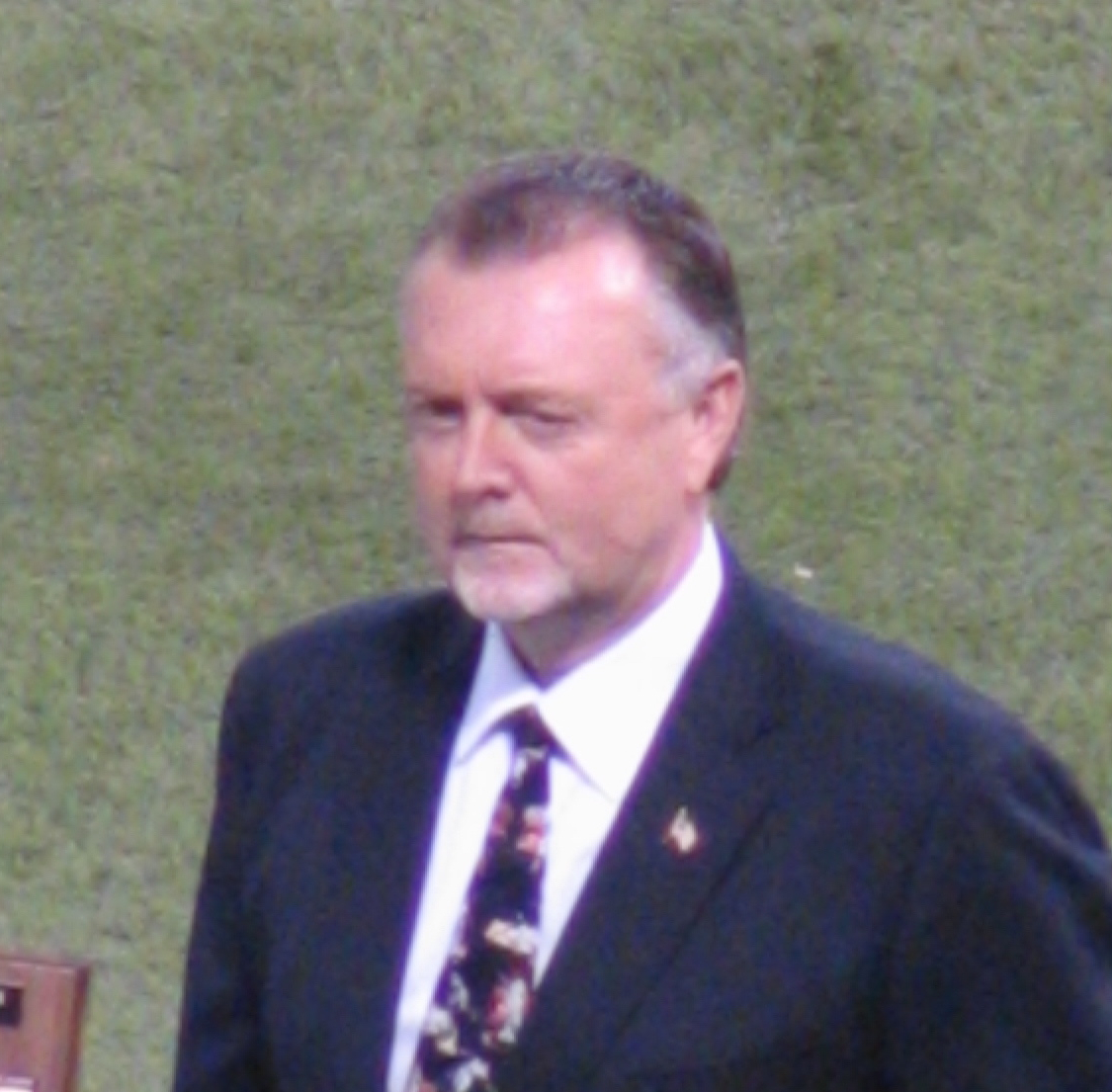
Bert Blyleven made six Opening Day starts for the Minnesota Twins

The Minnesota Twins are a Major League Baseball (MLB) franchise based in Minneapolis, Minnesota. They play in the American League Central division. They formerly played in Washington, D.C. as the Washington Senators before moving to Minnesota after the 1960 season. The first game of the new baseball season for a team is played on Opening Day, and being named the Opening Day starter is an honor, which is often given to the player who is expected to lead the pitching staff that season, though there are various strategic reasons why a team's best pitcher might not start on Opening Day. The Twins have used 26 different Opening Day starting pitchers in their 51 seasons in Minnesota. Starters have a combined Opening Day record of 14 wins, 25 losses and 12 no decisions. No decisions are only awarded to the starting pitcher if the game is won or lost after the starting pitcher has left the game.

Brad Radke holds the Minnesota Twins record for most Opening Day starts with nine. He has a record in Opening Day starts for the Twins of four wins and two losses (4–2) with three no decisions. Bert Blyleven had six Opening Day starts for the Twins and Frank Viola had four. Radke has the record for most wins in Minnesota Twins Opening Day starts with four. Liván Hernández, Mudcat Grant, and Dean Chance share the best winning percentage in Opening Day starts with one win and no losses (1–0) each. Kevin Tapani has the worst winning percentage, losing both Opening Day starts he made for the Twins (0–2).

Overall, Minnesota Twins Opening Day starting pitchers have a record of 4–7 with three no decisions at Metropolitan Stadium and a 1–4 record with one no decision at the Hubert H. Humphrey Metrodome. Their first home opener in their current ballpark of Target Field was in 2013. This gives their Opening Day starting pitchers' combined home record 5–11 with four no no decisions. Their away record is 9–14 with eight no decisions. The Twins went on to play in the World Series in 1965, 1987, and 1991, winning in 1987 and 1991. The Twins lost both Opening Day games in the years in which they won the World Series.

== Key ==
Season	Each year is linked to an article about that particular Twins season.
W	Win
L	Loss
ND (W)	No decision by starting pitcher; Twins won game
ND (L)	No decision by starting pitcher; Twins lost game
Final; Score	Game score with Twins runs listed first
Location	**Stadium in bold** for home game
Pitcher (#)	Number of appearances as Opening Day starter with the Twins
*	Advanced to the post-season
**	Won American League Championship Series
†	Won World Series

== Pitchers ==
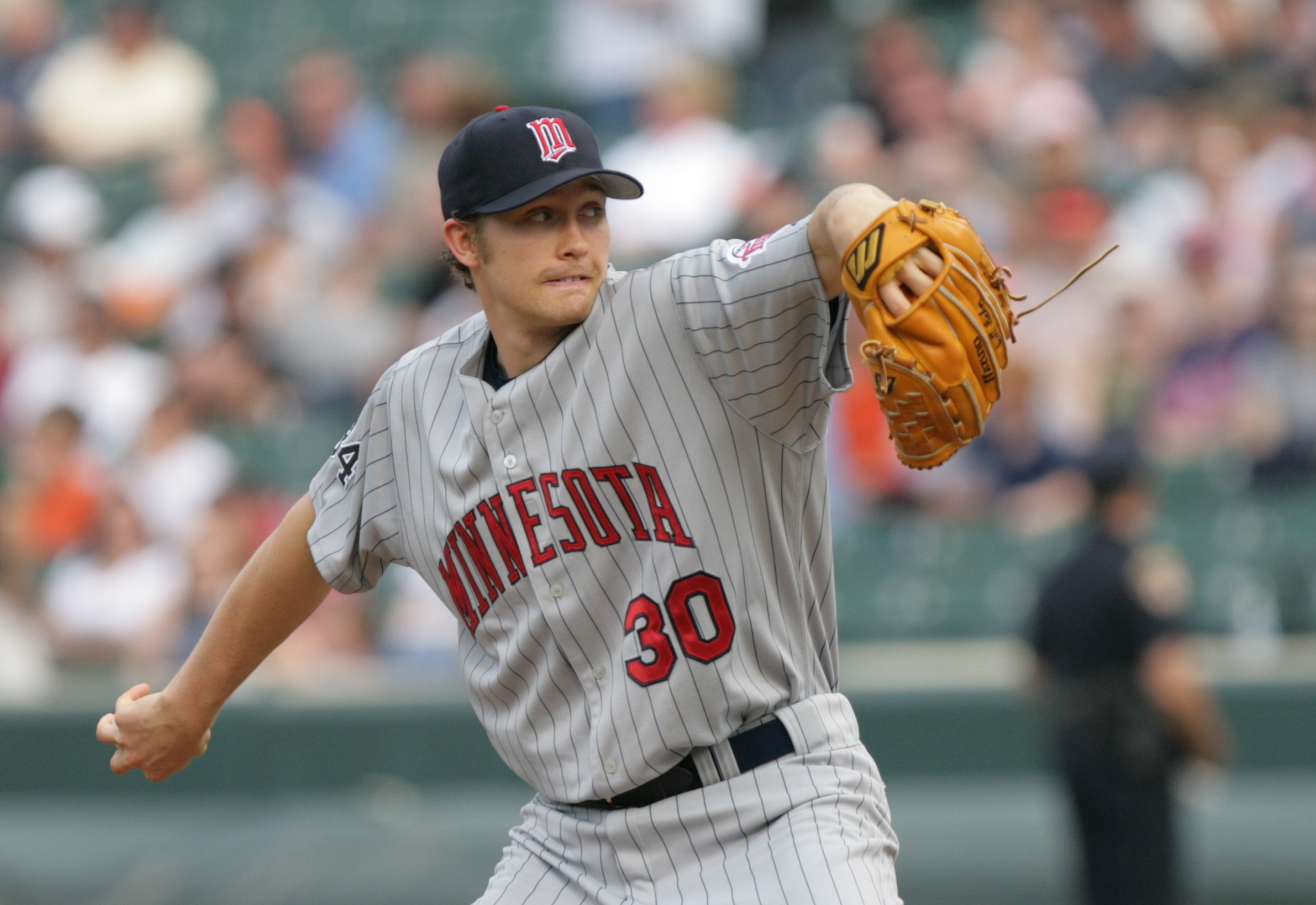
Scott Baker was the Twins' Opening Day starting pitcher in 2010

Season	Pitcher	Decision	Final score	Opponent	Location	Ref(s)
1961	Pedro Ramos	W	6–0	New York Yankees	Yankee Stadium (I)	
1962	Jack Kralick	L	2–4	Kansas City Athletics	Municipal Stadium	
1963	Camilo Pascual	L	4–5	Cleveland Indians	**Metropolitan Stadium**	
1964	Camilo Pascual (2)	ND (W)	7–6	Cleveland Indians	Cleveland Stadium	
1965**	Jim Kaat	ND (W)	5–4	New York Yankees	**Metropolitan Stadium**	
1966	Mudcat Grant	W	2–1	Kansas City Athletics	**Metropolitan Stadium**	
1967	Jim Kaat (2)	L	3–6	Baltimore Orioles	Memorial Stadium	
1968	Dean Chance	W	2–0	Washington Senators	Robert F. Kennedy Memorial Stadium	
1969*	Tom Hall	ND (L)	3–4	Kansas City Royals	Municipal Stadium	
1970*	Jim Perry	W	12–0	Chicago White Sox	Comiskey Park	
1971	Jim Perry (2)	L	2–7	Milwaukee Brewers	**Metropolitan Stadium**	
1972	Bert Blyleven	ND (L)	3–4	Oakland Athletics	Oakland–Alameda County Coliseum	
1973	Bert Blyleven (2)	W	8–3	Oakland Athletics	Oakland–Alameda County Coliseum	
1974	Bert Blyleven (3)	ND (W)	6–4	Kansas City Royals	Royals Stadium	
1975	Bert Blyleven (4)	W	11–4	Texas Rangers	Arlington Stadium	
1976	Bert Blyleven (5)	ND (L)	2–1	Texas Rangers	Arlington Stadium	
1977	Dave Goltz	L	4–7	Oakland Athletics	Oakland–Alameda County Coliseum	
1978	Dave Goltz (2)	L	2–3	Seattle Mariners	Kingdome	
1979	Dave Goltz (3)	W	5–3	Oakland Athletics	Oakland–Alameda County Coliseum	
1980	Jerry Koosman	ND (W)	9–7	Oakland Athletics	Oakland–Alameda County Coliseum	
1981	Jerry Koosman (2)	L	1–5	Oakland Athletics	**Metropolitan Stadium**	
1982*	Pete Redfern	L	7–11	Seattle Mariners	**Hubert H. Humphrey Metrodome**	
1983	Brad Havens	L	3–11	Detroit Tigers	**Hubert H. Humphrey Metrodome**	
1984	Albert Williams	L	1–8	Detroit Tigers	**Hubert H. Humphrey Metrodome**	
1985	Frank Viola	W	6–2	California Angels	Anaheim Stadium	
1986	Frank Viola (2)	W	3–2	Oakland Athletics	Oakland–Alameda County Coliseum	
1987†	Bert Blyleven (6)	ND (W)	5–4	Oakland Athletics	**Hubert H. Humphrey Metrodome**	
1988	Frank Viola (3)	L	0–8	New York Yankees	Yankee Stadium (I)	
1989	Frank Viola (4)	L	2–4	New York Yankees	**Hubert H. Humphrey Metrodome**	
1990	Allan Anderson	L	3–8	Oakland Athletics	Oakland–Alameda County Coliseum	
1991†	Jack Morris	L	2–7	Oakland Athletics	Oakland–Alameda County Coliseum	
1992	Scott Erickson	ND (W)	4–2	Milwaukee Brewers	Milwaukee County Stadium	
1993	Kevin Tapani	L	5–10	Chicago White Sox	**Hubert H. Humphrey Metrodome**	
1994	Kevin Tapani (2)	L	2–8	California Angels	**Hubert H. Humphrey Metrodome**	
1995	Scott Erickson (2)	L	0–9	Boston Red Sox	Fenway Park	
1996	Brad Radke	W	8–6	Detroit Tigers	**Hubert H. Humphrey Metrodome**	
1997	Brad Radke (2)	ND (W)	7–5	Detroit Tigers	**Hubert H. Humphrey Metrodome**	
1998	Bob Tewksbury	L	2–3	Toronto Blue Jays	SkyDome	
1999	Brad Radke (3)	W	6–1	Toronto Blue Jays	**Hubert H. Humphrey Metrodome**	
2000	Brad Radke (4)	L	0–7	Tampa Bay Devil Rays	**Hubert H. Humphrey Metrodome**	
2001	Brad Radke (5)	W	3–2	Detroit Tigers	Comerica Park	
2002*	Brad Radke (6)	ND (W)	8–6	Kansas City Royals	Kauffman Stadium	
2003*	Brad Radke (7)	W	3–1	Detroit Tigers	Comerica Park	
2004*	Brad Radke (8)	ND (W)	7–4	Cleveland Indians	**Hubert H. Humphrey Metrodome**	
2005	Brad Radke (9)	L	1–5	Seattle Mariners	Safeco Field	
2006*	Johan Santana	L	3–6	Toronto Blue Jays	Rogers Centre	
2007	Johan Santana (2)	W	7–4	Baltimore Orioles	**Hubert H. Humphrey Metrodome**	
2008	Liván Hernández	W	3–2	Los Angeles Angels of Anaheim	**Hubert H. Humphrey Metrodome**	
2009*	Francisco Liriano	L	1–6	Seattle Mariners	**Hubert H. Humphrey Metrodome**	
2010*	Scott Baker	L	3–6	Los Angeles Angels of Anaheim	Angel Stadium of Anaheim	
2011	Carl Pavano	L	3–11	Toronto Blue Jays	Rogers Centre	
2012	Carl Pavano (2)	L	2–4	Baltimore Orioles	Oriole Park at Camden Yards	
2013	Vance Worley	L	2–4	Detroit Tigers	**Target Field**	
2014	Ricky Nolasco	L	3–5	Chicago White Sox	U.S. Cellular Field	
2015	Phil Hughes	L	0–4	Detroit Tigers	Comerica Park	
2016	Ervin Santana	ND (L)	2–3	Baltimore Orioles	Camden Yards	
2017*	Ervin Santana (2)	W	7–1	Kansas City Royals	**Target Field**	
2018	Jake Odorizzi	ND (L)	2–3	Baltimore Orioles	Camden Yards	
2019*	José Berríos	W	2–0	Cleveland Indians	**Target Field**	
2020*	José Berríos (2)	ND (W)	10–5	Chicago White Sox	Guaranteed Rate Field	
2021	Kenta Maeda	ND (L)	5–6	Milwaukee Brewers	American Family Field	
2022	Joe Ryan	L	1–2	Seattle Mariners	**Target Field**	
2023*	Pablo López	W	2–0	Kansas City Royals	Kauffman Stadium	
2024	Pablo López (2)	W	4–1	Kansas City Royals	Kauffman Stadium	
2025	Pablo López (3)	L	3–5	St. Louis Cardinals	Busch Stadium	
2026	Joe Ryan (2)	ND (L)	1–2	Baltimore Orioles	Oriole Park at Camden Yards	
