= Capron, Oklahoma =

- Town
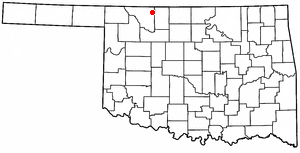
- Location of Capron, Oklahoma
- Coordinates: 36°53′48″N 98°34′39″W
- Country: United States
- State: Oklahoma
- County: Woods

Area
  - Total: 0.11 sq mi (0.28 km^{2})
  - Land: 0.11 sq mi (0.28 km^{2})
  - Water: 0 sq mi (0.00 km^{2})
- Elevation: 1,293 ft (394 m)

Population (2020)
  - Total: 27
  - Density: 249.6/sq mi (96.36/km^{2})
- Time zone: UTC-6 (Central (CST))
  - Summer (DST): UTC-5 (CDT)
- ZIP code: 73717
- Area code: 580
- FIPS code: 40-11750
- GNIS feature ID: 2413163

Capron is a town in Woods County, Oklahoma, United States. The population was 27 at the time of the 2020 Census, an increase from the 23 reported at the 2010 census.

== History ==
Prior to the opening of the Cherokee Strip in 1893, Capron, Oklahoma was first known as "Warren", a small cattle station on the main line of the Santa Fe railroad. It consisted of a store, and an old railroad car left by the Santa Fe. Sometime after the opening of the strip residents wanted to come up with a new name for the growing town. The name was changed to "Sterling", but the postal service and Santa Fe would not accept it because there was a town by that name on their line in Kansas. The names of "Virgil" and "Kermit" were proposed, but Santa Fe would not accept these names, for the same reason. Therefore, a committee consisting of Mr. George Espy, postmaster, Dr. G.W. Todd, and Congressman Dennis Flynn was appointed to select a name which the Santa Fe and Postal Service would accept. The name of Captain Allyn K. Capron, Jr. was proposed. Captain Capron was a member of Teddy Roosevelt's Rough Riders, and had been killed at the Battle of San Juan Hill. The name of "Capron" was approved by a petition of the residents. The Santa Fe and U. S. Postal service accepted the name and so it stands today.

At one time Capron was quite a thriving community. It had two banks; the Bank of Capron, and the Capron State Bank; three general stores; two drug stores; a hotel; depot; a millinery shop; theater; blacksmith; a weekly newspaper, The Capron Hustler; a monthly newspaper, The Screech Owl; two barber shops; hardware store; lumber yard; two churches, Warburton Memorial Methodist Church, and First Congregational Church; the Driftwood Telephone Company and Hampton's Foot Powder Factory.

A tornado struck Capron in the early morning of April 15, 1939, destroying the town's new public school building and its entire business section. The tornado hit as a train was on its regular path through Capron, derailing several cars. At least 15 people were injured by the storm. The majority of the town's businesses were never rebuilt; however, the school was later reconstructed.

Capron was always concerned with having a good school system. In 1894 a small but enterprising group of Driftwood Township citizens provided for the establishment of the first Capron Public Schools. The school consisted of grades 1–8 and consisted of a two-room frame building located south and east of the present south Coop Grain Elevator. This building proved adequate until 1909 when a new two-story brick building was built in the north end of town at the site of the present school building. The cost of the 1909 building was $8,500.00. In 1929 residents approved the building of a new one-story building with a large gymnasium and auditorium attached. The old two-story building was torn down to make way for this modern facility. This building was destroyed in the 1939 tornado and a new building, auditorium and gymnasium were built in 1940. At the time, this facility was considered to be one of the best schools in northwest Oklahoma. Additions to the present building were made: in 1952, vocational agriculture building; 1956, additional classrooms and music room; and 1964, when a new cafeteria was added to the school. The high school was first accredited in 1912. In 1968 the high school was closed due to falling enrollment. There were no families in the school district on public assistance in 1968, and the patrons of the district never voted down a tax increase for their school; they wanted the very best for their children. The Elementary School, grades K–8 were closed in 1976 by a vote of the patrons which carried by only one vote. The vote was contested. This decision was taken to court and eventually upheld by the Oklahoma Supreme Court. Today Capron has two large concrete grain elevators, a rural water district office, United Methodist Church, garage, filling station, and American Legion Post. The Post Office closed in 1994 after 100 years of service to the citizens of the area.

== Geography ==
According to the United States Census Bureau, the town has a total area of 0.1 square miles (0.26 km^{2}), all land.

== Demographics ==
Historical population
Census	Pop.	Note	%±
1910	196		—
1920	184		−6.1%
1930	155		−15.8%
1940	147		−5.2%
1950	100		−32.0%
1960	102		2.0%
1970	80		−21.6%
1980	54		−32.5%
1990	38		−29.6%
2000	42		10.5%
2010	23		−45.2%
2020	27		17.4%
U.S. Decennial Census

=== 2020 census ===
As of the 2020 census, Capron had a population of 27. The median age was 23.5 years. 22.2% of residents were under the age of 18 and 18.5% of residents were 65 years of age or older. For every 100 females there were 42.1 males, and for every 100 females age 18 and over there were 40.0 males age 18 and over.

0.0% of residents lived in urban areas, while 100.0% lived in rural areas.

There were 7 households in Capron, of which 28.6% had children under the age of 18 living in them. Of all households, 42.9% were married-couple households, 42.9% were households with a male householder and no spouse or partner present, and 14.3% were households with a female householder and no spouse or partner present. About 28.6% of all households were made up of individuals and 14.3% had someone living alone who was 65 years of age or older.

There were 15 housing units, of which 53.3% were vacant. The homeowner vacancy rate was 16.7% and the rental vacancy rate was 0.0%.

Racial composition as of the 2020 census
Race	Number	Percent
White	20	74.1%
Black or African American	0	0.0%
American Indian and Alaska Native	3	11.1%
Asian	1	3.7%
Native Hawaiian and Other Pacific Islander	0	0.0%
Some other race	0	0.0%
Two or more races	3	11.1%
Hispanic or Latino (of any race)	3	11.1%

=== 2000 census ===
As of the census of 2000, there were 42 people, 17 households, and 10 families residing in the town. The population density was 370.2 inhabitants per square mile (142.9/km^{2}). There were 20 housing units at an average density of 176.3 per square mile (68.1/km^{2}). The racial makeup of the town was 100.00% White.

There were 17 households, out of which 23.5% had children under the age of 18 living with them, 58.8% were married couples living together, 5.9% had a female householder with no husband present, and 35.3% were non-families. 29.4% of all households were made up of individuals, and 11.8% had someone living alone who was 65 years of age or older. The average household size was 2.47 and the average family size was 3.18.

In the town, the population was spread out, with 19.0% under the age of 18, 7.1% from 18 to 24, 33.3% from 25 to 44, 28.6% from 45 to 64, and 11.9% who were 65 years of age or older. The median age was 42 years. For every 100 females, there were 133.3 males. For every 100 females age 18 and over, there were 112.5 males.

The median income for a household in the town was $24,250, and the median income for a family was $23,750. Males had a median income of $22,500 versus $16,250 for females. The per capita income for the town was $11,156. None of the population and none of the families were below the poverty line.

== Notable people ==
- Danny Thompson, professional baseball player
