= Tom Norton =

American baseball player

- Pitcher
- Born: April 26, 1950; Elyria, Ohio, U.S.
- Batted: Right Threw: Right

MLB debut
- April 18, 1972, for the Minnesota Twins

Last MLB appearance
- September 30, 1972, for the Minnesota Twins

MLB statistics
- Games pitched: 21
- Win–loss record: 0-1
- Earned run average: 2.78
- Strikeouts: 22
- Walks: 14
- Innings pitched: 32 1/3
- Stats at Baseball Reference

Teams
- Minnesota Twins (1972)

Thomas John Norton (born April 26, 1950) is an American former professional baseball relief pitcher who played for the Minnesota Twins of Major League Baseball (MLB) in its 1972 season.
