= Steve Barber (right-handed pitcher) =

American baseball player

- Pitcher
- Born: March 13, 1948 (age 78); Grand Rapids, Michigan, U.S.
- Batted: Right Threw: Right

MLB debut
- April 9, 1970, for the Minnesota Twins

Last MLB appearance
- May 6, 1971, for the Minnesota Twins

MLB statistics
- Win–loss record: 1–0
- Earned run average: 5.08
- Strikeouts: 18
- Stats at Baseball Reference

Teams
- Minnesota Twins (1970–1971)

Steven Lee Barber (born March 13, 1948) is an American former right-handed Major League Baseball pitcher for the Minnesota Twins.

Steve Barber played in portions of two seasons for the Minnesota Twins. Barber attended the University of Arizona and was signed as an undrafted free-agent by the Twins before the 1969 season.

Barber appeared in 18 games for the 1970 Twins, all in relief, finishing ten. He was credited with two saves, his first coming in his major league debut on April 9 at Chicago against the Chicago White Sox. He saw action in four games for the 1971 Twins, starting twice. He earned his only major league victory on April 19, 1971, pitching 3.2 innings in relief in a 9–8 victory over the Kansas City Royals.

His professional career began in 1969 with the Wisconsin Rapids Twins of the (Class A) Midwest League. In both 1970 and 1971 he split his time between the Twins and their Triple-A farm clubs—the Evansville Triplets (American Association) in 1970 and the Portland Beavers (Pacific Coast League) in 1971. He closed out his professional career with the Charlotte Hornets (Class AA, Southern League) in 1972.
