= Paul Ratliff =

American baseball player (born 1944)

- Catcher
- Born: January 23, 1944 (age 82); San Diego, California, U.S.
- Batted: Left Threw: Right

MLB debut
- April 14, 1963, for the Minnesota Twins

Last MLB appearance
- July 23, 1972, for the Milwaukee Brewers

MLB statistics
- Batting average: .205
- Home runs: 12
- Runs batted in: 42
- Stats at Baseball Reference

Teams
- Minnesota Twins (1963, 1970–1971); Milwaukee Brewers (1971–1972)

Paul Hawthorne Ratliff (born January 23, 1944) is an American former Major League Baseball player, who played catcher for the Minnesota Twins during the 1963, 1970, and 1971 seasons and for the Milwaukee Brewers in 1971-1972.

Ratliff played high school baseball at Pasadena High School in Pasadena, Texas, before being signed as an amateur free agent by the Minnesota Twins in 1962. The next season Ratliff, at the age of nineteen, was on the Twins opening day roster. He appeared in ten games that season before being demoted to the minor leagues. Ratliff would not make it back to the majors till 1970.

In 1970 Ratliff split the Twins catching duties with George Mitterwald and played in the 1970 American League Championship Series. The next year Ratliff was traded to the Milwaukee Brewers for Phil Roof. Ratliff played for the Brewers in 1971 and 1972 till he was traded to the California Angels on July 28. He never appeared again in a major league game.

Ratliff also appeared on several episodes of "CHEERS" in the early 1980's. Season one, episode # 13 "now pitching, sam malone" featured a scene with TED DANSEN & 4 ex-pro ball players. RATLIFF-LUIS TIANT-JAY TATAR & HENRY "ROBBIE" ROBINSON.

On April 25, 1970, Ratliff was involved in a bizarre play. The description from Baseball Library reads as follows:

"Detroit Tigers Pitcher Earl Wilson fans for the 3rd out in the 7th inning against the Twins. On the 3rd strike by Jim Kaat‚ Ratliff traps the ball in the dirt‚ and must either throw to first base or tag the batter. Instead he rolls the ball back to the mound‚ ignoring the fact that ump John Rice has not signaled a strikeout. As the Twins head for their dugout‚ Wilson begins running the bases and is around third base when outfielder Brant Alyea retrieves the ball and throws to shortstop Leo Cárdenas‚ who is standing by home. Wilson turns back to third base but Cardenas and Alyea run him down for a 7-6-7 out on a 3rd strike."

Ratliff was charged with an error on the play.
