= Danny Thompson (baseball) =

American baseball player (1947–1976)

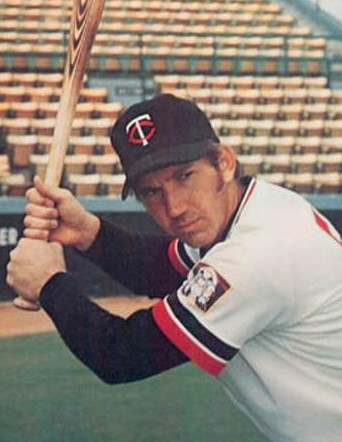
- Shortstop
- Born: February 1, 1947; Wichita, Kansas, U.S.
- Died: December 10, 1976 (aged 29); Rochester, Minnesota, U.S.
- Batted: Right Threw: Right

MLB debut
- June 25, 1970, for the Minnesota Twins

Last MLB appearance
- October 2, 1976, for the Texas Rangers

MLB statistics
- Batting average: .248
- Home Runs: 15
- Runs batted in: 194
- Stats at Baseball Reference

Teams
- Minnesota Twins (1970–1976); Texas Rangers (1976)

Danny Leon Thompson (February 1, 1947 – December 10, 1976) was an American college and professional baseball player, a major league shortstop from 1970 to 1976. Diagnosed with leukemia in early 1973 at age 26, he played four more seasons in the majors and died ten weeks after his final game.

== Baseball career ==
Born in Wichita, Kansas, Thompson grew up in tiny Capron, Oklahoma, and played college baseball at Oklahoma State University in Stillwater, where he was an All-American. He was the first pick of the Minnesota Twins in the secondary phase of the 1968 amateur draft.

Thompson broke into the majors with the Twins in 1970 and had his first full season in 1972. He was traded along with Bert Blyleven from the Twins to the Texas Rangers for Roy Smalley III, Mike Cubbage, Bill Singer and Jim Gideon on June 1, 1976.

== Leukemia ==
Following a routine pre-season physical the day before his 26th birthday, Thompson was called in for additional tests and diagnosed with granulocytic leukemia in early February 1973, but he continued his major league career for the next four seasons. He was awarded baseball's annual Hutch Award in Seattle following the 1974 season, and batted .270 in 1975, leading all American League shortstops.

Thompson appeared in 98 games in 1976, and went 1-for-3 in his final start for the Rangers on September 29 in Minnesota's Metropolitan Stadium. In his final game on October 2, less than ten weeks before his death, he was used as a pinch hitter.

== Death ==
Admitted to the Mayo Clinic in Rochester, Minnesota, on November 16, 1976, Thompson underwent spleen surgery on December 3, and died a week later on December 10, 1976, from complications in Rochester's St. Mary's Hospital. Thompson was 29, leaving behind a wife, Jo, and two young daughters, Tracy and Dana. His funeral was attended by hundreds at the high school gymnasium in Burlington, Oklahoma, and he was buried nearby at the cemetery in his hometown of Capron.

== Legacy ==
During the 1977 season, members of the Texas Rangers wore a black armband with the No. 4 on their left uniform sleeve. Examples of this tribute can be seen in the 1978 Topps baseball card set.

An annual golf tournament honoring Thompson is held in August in Sun Valley, Idaho. The Danny Thompson Memorial Golf Tournament, benefiting leukemia and cancer research, was launched in 1977 by the Hall of Famer Harmon Killebrew (1936–2011), a former teammate with the Twins; and Ralph Harding (1929–2006), a former Idaho congressman. The first edition included former President Gerald Ford, Speaker of the House Tip O'Neill, and Hall of Fame slugger Mickey Mantle. It has donated over $15.6 million since its inception. Killebrew disclosed his esophageal cancer in late 2010 and died five months later at age 74. Following Killebrew's death, the event was renamed the "Killebrew-Thompson Memorial Golf Tournament" (KTM), with events in Idaho and Minnesota.

== See also ==
- List of baseball players who died during their careers
