= Bill Rigney =

American baseball player and manager (1918-2001)

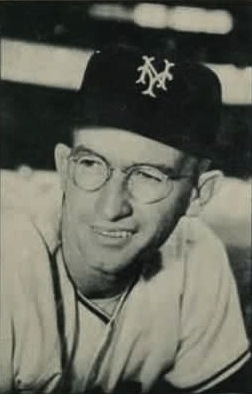
- Rigney in 1953
- Infielder / Manager
- Born: January 29, 1918; Alameda, California, U.S.
- Died: February 20, 2001 (aged 83); Walnut Creek, California, U.S.
- Batted: Right Threw: Right

MLB debut
- April 16, 1946, for the New York Giants

Last MLB appearance
- September 12, 1953, for the New York Giants

MLB statistics
- Batting average: .259
- Home runs: 41
- Runs batted in: 212
- Managerial record: 1,239–1,321
- Winning %: .484
- Stats at Baseball Reference
- Managerial record at Baseball Reference

Teams
- As player: New York Giants (1946–1953); As manager: New York / San Francisco Giants (1956–1960); Los Angeles / California Angels (1961–1969); Minnesota Twins (1970–1972); San Francisco Giants (1976); As coach: San Diego Padres (1975)

Career highlights and awards
- All-Star (1948)

William Joseph Rigney (January 29, 1918 – February 20, 2001) was an American professional baseball infielder and manager in Major League Baseball (MLB). A 26-year veteran in the major leagues, Rigney played for the New York Giants from 1946 to 1953, then spent 18 seasons as the skipper of three major-league clubs.

The San Francisco Bay Area native began his managerial career with the Giants and served as the team's last manager in New York City (1957) and its first in San Francisco (1958). In 1961, Rigney became the first manager in the history of the Los Angeles Angels of the American League, serving until May of 1969. Then, in 1970, he managed the Minnesota Twins to the AL West division championship, the only postseason entry of his big-league tenure. Fired midseason in 1972, he concluded his managerial career in 1976 by serving a one-year term at the helm of his original team, the Giants.

== New York Giants' infielder ==
Born in Alameda, California, Rigney batted and threw right-handed, stood 6 feet 1 inch (1.85 m) tall and weighed 178 pounds (81 kg). He began his professional baseball career in 1938 when he signed with the unaffiliated Oakland Oaks of the top-level Pacific Coast League. After seasoning in the Class B Western International League, Rigney played the full seasons of 1941 and 1942 with the Oaks, then performed World War II service in the United States Coast Guard from 1943–1945.

Acquired by the Giants during the war, he was a 28-year-old rookie in 1946 and played third base, shortstop and second base during his MLB career—appearing in over 100 games played in each of his first four MLB seasons. Rigney was the Giants' regular third baseman in 1946 and their starting second baseman in both 1947 and 1948. His most productive season came in 1947, when he reached career highs in home runs (17), runs batted in (59), runs (84), hits (142), doubles (24) and games played (130). In 1948, he was selected to the National League All-Star team; in the 1948 midsummer classic, on July 13 at Sportsman's Park, St. Louis, he drew a base on balls off Joe Coleman in his only plate appearance.

On August 12, 1950, Rigney replaced Eddie Stanky at second base after Stanky had been ejected from a game against the Phillies for repeatedly waving his arms while Andy Seminick was batting. Seminick was still irritated, and after he reached base on an error in the fourth inning, he slid hard into second base, crashing into Rigney and causing him to fall over. A nearly ten-minute brawl erupted between the teams, which required police intervention and resulted in the ejection of Seminick and Rigney from the game. The Phillies went on to win 4–3.

As a utility infielder, Rigney was a member of the 1951 NL champion Giants, and he appeared in four games of the 1951 World Series, collecting one hit in four at bats (a single off Vic Raschi), with one run batted in, as a pinch hitter.

As a big-leaguer, Rigney was a .259 career batsman with 510 hits, 41 home runs and 212 runs batted in over 654 games.

== Manager of three MLB clubs ==
=== Giants ===
Following his MLB playing career, Rigney was named manager of the Giants' top farm club, the Triple-A Minneapolis Millers, in 1954–1955. He led the Millers to two playoff appearances, a 170–135 overall record, and the 1955 American Association and Junior World Series championships. He then was promoted to skipper of the parent Giants in 1956, succeeding his mentor, Leo Durocher. Despite the presence of Hall of Fame center fielder Willie Mays, the Giants' final two seasons in Upper Manhattan, 1956 and 1957, were dismal: they lost 87 and 85 games, respectively, finished in sixth place in the eight-team National League both years (a combined 52 games out of first place), and their attendance fell below 700,000.

But upon their move to San Francisco in 1958—and rejuvenated by young players such as Orlando Cepeda, Jim Davenport, Felipe Alou, and, later, Willie McCovey—the Giants returned to the first division and contended for the NL pennant into the final regular-season weekend in 1959. The 1960 Giants moved into new Candlestick Park and were expected to again contend for the league title. They got off the mark quickly, winning 20 of their first 29 games. But then they stumbled, losing 16 of their next 29, and were coming off a three-game series sweep at home by the eventual world champion Pittsburgh Pirates when, on June 17, Rigney was fired. At 33–25, his club was in second place, four games behind Pittsburgh, when Rigney was dismissed. Tom Sheehan, the veteran scout who replaced Rigney, fared even more poorly, however, going only 46–50 as the Giants plummeted into fifth place by season's end.

=== Angels ===
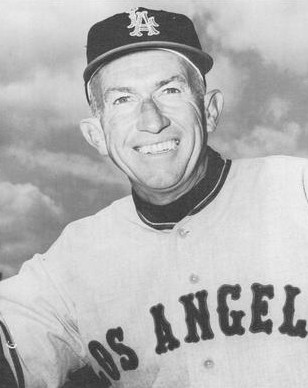
Rigney in 1964

Rigney was not unemployed for long. He became the first skipper in the history of the expansion Los Angeles Angels of the American League in 1961. Gene Autry and Robert O. Reynolds, the Angels' owners, originally wanted to hire future Baseball Hall of Fame manager Casey Stengel, a resident of nearby Glendale who had been fired by the New York Yankees after the 1960 World Series. But Stengel declined all managerial offers and spent 1961 in temporary retirement. Then Durocher, out of uniform since leaving the Giants in 1955 and working as a broadcaster, campaigned for the Angel job. Like Stengel, he had become a permanent resident of Southern California—he lived in Palm Springs—and was a future Hall of Fame pilot. But Autry and Reynolds bypassed him and chose Rigney instead, believing that he would have the patience to develop an expansion team's younger players.

While the Angels' maiden edition lost 91 games and finished eighth in the ten-team AL, the 1962 team, paced by young pitchers Dean Chance and Bo Belinsky, stunned baseball by finishing in third place with an 86–76 record during their second season of existence. As a result, Rigney was named Manager of the Year by The Sporting News.

During Rigney's eight full years with the Angels, the club played in three home ballparks—Wrigley Field, Dodger Stadium and Anaheim Stadium—and also compiled winning records in 1964 and 1967. But 1969, Rigney's ninth season, proved catastrophic. The Angels started the year 11–28 and were mired in a ten-game losing streak when Rigney was fired on May 27 and succeeded by Lefty Phillips. Later in 1969, Rigney joined the San Francisco Giants' radio broadcast team to close out the season; coincidentally, KSFO, the Giants flagship station, was then owned by Autry and Reynolds.

=== Twins ===
Returning to the field (and to the Twin Cities of Minneapolis–St. Paul) the next year, Rigney succeeded Billy Martin as manager of the Minnesota Twins in 1970, leading them to 98 victories and the American League West Division championship. But the Twins fell in three straight games to the eventual world champion Baltimore Orioles in the 1970 American League Championship Series, then won only 74 games in 1971. When the Twins began 1972 with a 36–34 record and 91/2 games behind the eventual World Series champion Oakland Athletics in third place, Rigney was replaced by Frank Quilici on July 6. Team owner Calvin Griffith's explanation for the move was that he felt many of the Twins players "were too nonchalant."

=== Second turn with Giants ===
After serving as a scout for the San Diego Padres and California Angels (1973–1974), Rigney had a second managerial stint with the Giants in 1976, a year of transition between the Horace Stoneham and Bob Lurie ownerships. Rigney's 1976 club went only 74–88 and finished 28 games behind the world champion Cincinnati Reds. Joe Altobelli succeeded him at the Giants' helm on October 7, 1976. Rigney finished with a managerial record of 1,239 wins and 1,321 losses.

=== Managerial record ===
Team	From	To	Regular season record			Post–season record		
Team	From	To	W	L	Win %	W	L	Win %
New York/San Francisco Giants	1956	1960	332	342	.493	—		
Los Angeles/California Angels	1961	1969	625	707	.469	—		
Minnesota Twins	1970	1972	208	184	.531	0	3	.000
San Francisco Giants	1976	1976	74	88	.457	—		
Total			1239	1321	.484	0	3	.000
Ref.:

== Broadcaster, scout and "ambassador" ==
In an 18-season managerial career, Rigney posted a 1,239–1,321 record (.484) in 2,561 games. The Twins' three-and-out loss in the 1970 ALCS was his only MLB postseason managing appearance. As a minor league pilot, Rigney won the 1955 American Association championship at the helm of the Minneapolis Millers.

After leaving the Giants at the close of his second managerial term in 1976, he served as a front-office consultant and a radio and television broadcaster for the Oakland Athletics in the 1980s.

Rigney died in Walnut Creek, California, at age of 83.

The "Bill Rigney Good Guy Award" is given each year to a Bay-Area MLB player who is most accommodating to the media.

== Quotation ==
- Rigney took the reins of the Giants in 1956, succeeding Leo Durocher, for whom he had played from 1948 to 1953. "I learned a lot from Leo Durocher", he said. "I learned about the hit-and-run, about gambling and going against the percentages. You can't play it the same all the time." – Norman L. Macht, at Baseball Library

== See also ==
- List of Major League Baseball managers with most career wins

Preceded by Freddie Fitzsimmons	Minneapolis Millers manager 1954–1955	Succeeded by Eddie Stanky
