= Frank Quilici =

American baseball player and manager (1939-2018)

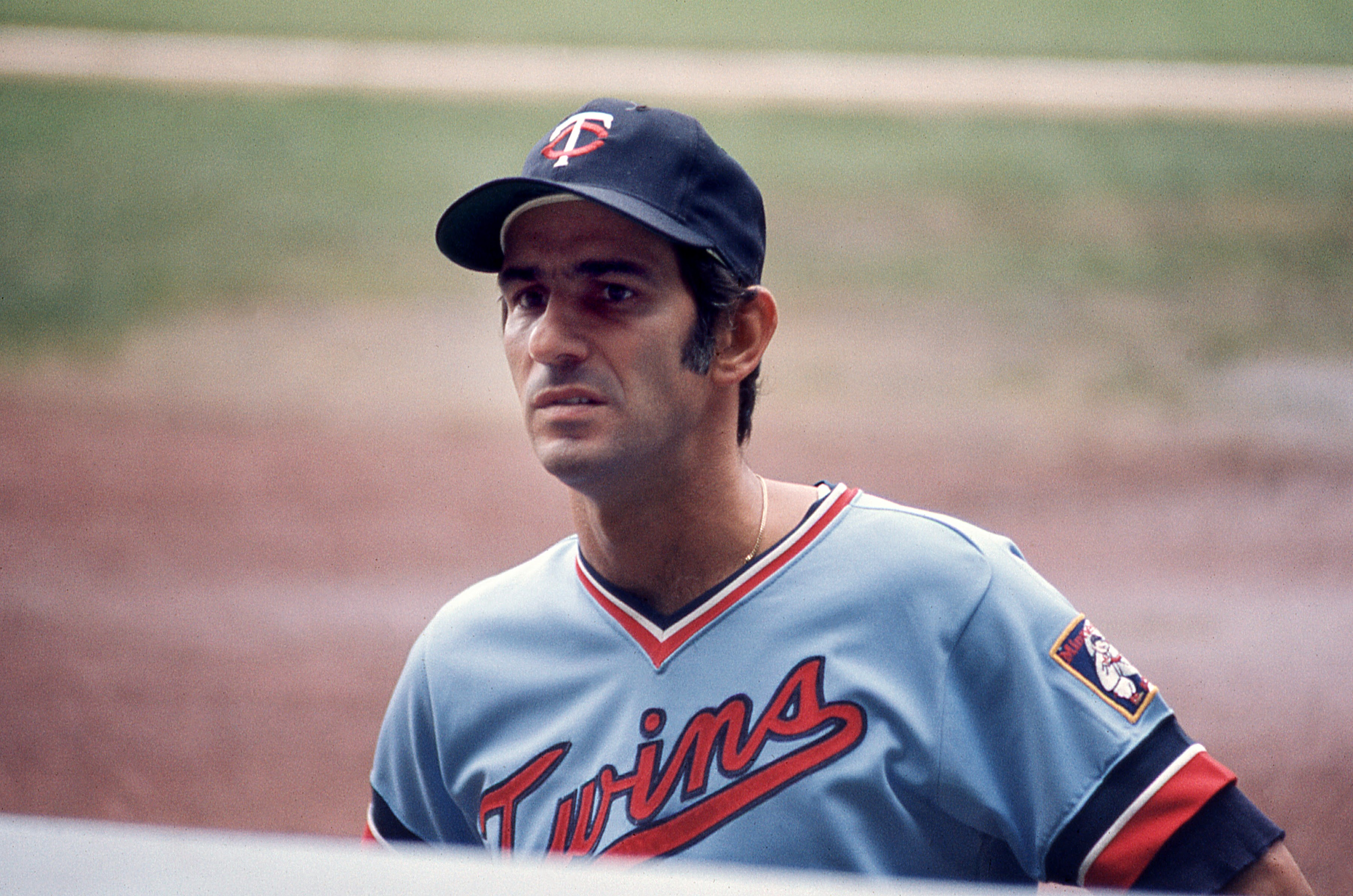
- Second baseman / Manager
- Born: May 11, 1939; Chicago, Illinois, U.S.
- Died: May 14, 2018 (aged 79); Burnsville, Minnesota, U.S.
- Batted: Right Threw: Right

MLB debut
- July 18, 1965, for the Minnesota Twins

Last MLB appearance
- September 29, 1970, for the Minnesota Twins

MLB statistics
- Batting average: .214
- Home runs: 5
- Runs batted in: 53
- Managerial record: 280–287
- Winning %: .494
- Stats at Baseball Reference
- Managerial record at Baseball Reference

Teams
- As player: Minnesota Twins (1965, 1967–1970); As coach: Minnesota Twins (1971–1972); As manager: Minnesota Twins (1972–1975)

Francis Ralph Quilici (/ˈkwɪlɪsiː/ KWIL-ih-see; May 11, 1939 – May 14, 2018) was an American professional baseball player, coach and manager who spent his entire Major League Baseball career with the Minnesota Twins. Quilici served the team for all or part of five years as an infielder, 11/2 years as a coach, and 31/2 years as manager, then spent six more years as a broadcaster for them. He threw and batted right-handed, stood 6 feet 1 inch (1.85 m) tall and weighed 170 pounds (77 kg).

== Playing career ==
Quilici was born in Chicago, where he graduated from St. Mel High School. He attended Loras College and Western Michigan University. In 1961, he signed with the Twins during their first year in Minneapolis–Saint Paul after they transferred from Washington. Upon entering the Twins' farm system, he rose from Class D to Triple-A over the next 41/2 seasons and was batting .277 with the Denver Bears when the pennant-bound 1965 Twins called him to the majors in July. With veteran incumbent second baseman Jerry Kindall suffering from a chronic hamstring injury, Quilici quickly assumed a key role in the Minnesota lineup, starting 39 games at second base during the season's final ten weeks.

Then, in the 1965 World Series, Quilici started all seven games against the Los Angeles Dodgers and collected four hits (with two doubles) in 20 at bats and a run batted in. One of his doubles touched off a six-run, third inning rally against eventual Baseball Hall of Famer Don Drysdale in Game 1. When the Twins batted around in that frame, Quilici came to the plate again and chased Drysdale with a single. His two hits in one inning tied a record and sparked an 8–2 Minnesota victory. In the field, Quilici played every inning of all seven games, making two errors in 36 chances for a .944 fielding percentage. But the Twins succumbed to another future Hall of Famer, Sandy Koufax, in Game 7, 2–0, to lose the series. Quilici had a double in three at bats in that final contest against the Dodger southpaw.

The following year, 1966, was a setback for Quilici. He spent the entire season at Triple-A Denver, as the Twins alternated Bernie Allen and César Tovar as their regular second basemen. When Quilici returned to Minnesota in 1967 it was as a utility infielder: standout rookie Rod Carew, yet another future Hall of Famer, won the Twins' second base job and would hold it for the next eight seasons. Quilici spent all of 1968, 1969 and 1970 on the Twins' roster, playing in an average of 109 games each year, mostly at second base, third base and shortstop, batting a career-high .245 in 1968. As a player, Quilici batted .214 in 405 games played; his 146 MLB hits included 23 doubles, six triples and with five home runs. He collected 53 runs batted in.

== Coach, manager and broadcaster ==
During the 1970–1971 offseason, a vacancy opened on manager Bill Rigney's coaching staff when Sherry Robertson was killed in an automobile accident. Looking to save a roster spot, but retain Quilici as potential insurance in case one of their infielders were injured, the Twins named the 31-year-old to fill Robertson's slot as the club's fifth coach. While Quilici never returned to the active list, the coaching appointment lasted for all of 1971 and into 1972.

On July 6, 1972, with team owner Calvin Griffith seeking to shake up his 36–34 Twins, then trailing the eventual World Series champion Oakland Athletics by 91/2 games in third place in the American League West, Quilici was promoted to replace Rigney as manager. Age 33 at the time of his appointment, he was the youngest manager in the major leagues that season and throughout his managerial term. The Twins went 41–43 under Quilici in 1972 in the first of three straight third-place finishes, which included 81–81 in 1973 and 82–80 in 1974. When the club fell to fourth place with a 76–83 record in 1975, Quilici was fired after a season-ending 6–4 loss to the Chicago White Sox at Metropolitan Stadium on September 28. He was replaced by Gene Mauch two months later on November 24. His record as Minnesota's manager was 280–287 (.494).

He remained associated with the Twins, however, as a radio commentator on the team's broadcasts in 1976–1977, 1980–1982 and 1987. Outside of baseball he was active in business and charitable activities in the Twin Cities region.

Frank Quilici died on May 14, 2018, at the age of 79 in Burnsville, Minnesota, after suffering from kidney disease.
