= Joe Decker =

American baseball player (1947–2003)

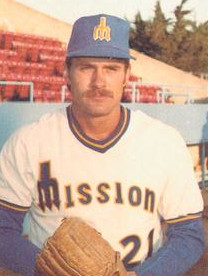
- Pitcher
- Born: June 16, 1947; Storm Lake, Iowa, U.S.
- Died: March 2, 2003 (aged 55); Fraser, Michigan, U.S.
- Batted: Right Threw: Right

MLB debut
- September 18, 1969, for the Chicago Cubs

Last MLB appearance
- July 7, 1979, for the Seattle Mariners

MLB statistics
- Win–loss record: 36–44
- Earned run average: 4.17
- Strikeouts: 458
- Stats at Baseball Reference

Teams
- Chicago Cubs (1969–1972); Minnesota Twins (1973–1976); Seattle Mariners (1979)

George Henry Decker Jr. (June 16, 1947 – March 2, 2003) was an American Major League Baseball pitcher for the Chicago Cubs (1969–72), Minnesota Twins (1973–76) and Seattle Mariners (1979).

== Early life and education ==
Decker was born in Storm Lake, Iowa. After his father, George Sr., died, Decker's family moved to California. He attended Petaluma High School in Petaluma, California.

The Cubs selected Decker in the ninth round of the 1965 MLB draft. He signed for a $50,000 signing bonus and the Cubs committing to pay for his college expenses.

== Career ==
Decker reached the majors as a September call-up in 1969. In parts of four seasons with Chicago, he was 7–9 with a 4.37 earned run average. He lacked control, leading some teammates to refuse facing him during practice.

The Cubs traded Decker, Bill Hands, and minor‐league pitcher Bob Maneely to the Twins for Dave LaRoche on December 1, 1972. On June 26, 1973, Decker threw a 15-strikeout shutout over the Chicago White Sox, matching a single-game franchise strikeout record set by Camilo Pascual in 1961. Decker paired with Bert Blyleven at the top of the Twins rotation for two seasons. He missed almost two months of the 1976 season, his last with the Twins, with a viral infection.

Decker.played in the minors with the Detroit Tigers, Cubs, and in the Mexican Baseball League before signing with the Mariners. He returned to the majors for nine games in 1979. He continued to pitch in the minors through 1983, later playing in the Senior Professional Baseball Association.

== Personal life ==
Decker was married twice. He and his ex-wife had two children, then he and his widow had one child. Decker had two younger siblings.

Decker died at age 55 from head injuries following a fall at his home in Fraser, Michigan.

| Preceded by Camilo Pascual | Minnesota Twins; Single-Game Strikeout Total; Record Holder (15); 1973 | Succeeded by Jerry Koosman |
