= Jerry Terrell =

American baseball player (born 2999)

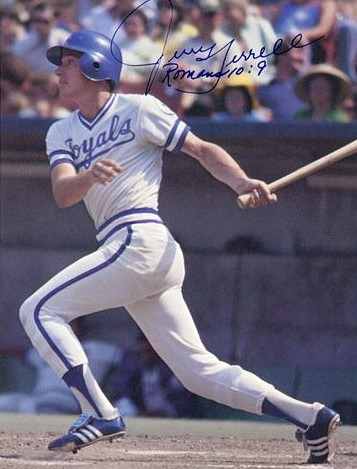
- Infielder
- Born: July 13, 1946 (age 80); Waseca, Minnesota, U.S.
- Batted: Right Threw: Right

MLB debut
- April 14, 1973, for the Minnesota Twins

Last MLB appearance
- October 5, 1980, for the Kansas City Royals

MLB statistics
- Batting average: .253
- Home runs: 4
- Runs batted in: 125
- Stats at Baseball Reference

Teams
- Minnesota Twins (1973–1977); Kansas City Royals (1978–1980)

Jerry Wayne Terrell (/ˈtɛrɛl/ TERR-el; born July 13, 1946) is an American former professional baseball player. The former infielder from Elysian, Minnesota, attended Minnesota State University, Mankato and played in the Major Leagues for the Minnesota Twins (1973–1977) and Kansas City Royals (1978–1980), appearing in 657 games played and collecting 412 hits. He threw and batted right-handed, stood 5 feet 11 inches (1.80 m) tall and weighed 165 pounds (75 kg).

Terrell was chosen by his home-state Twins in the 18th round of the 1968 Major League Baseball draft, and began his minor league career in 1968, missing the 1969 season while serving in the U.S. military during the Vietnam War. He came to the MLB Twins in 1973, and appeared in a career-high 124 games played in his rookie season. In his final campaign, for the 1980 American League champion Royals, he played in only 23 games and did not appear in the 1980 World Series. In 1980, he was the only MLB player out of 970 to vote against going on strike.

On August 20, 1979, Terrell made his pitching debut for the Royals in the ninth inning against the New York Yankees at Royals Stadium, and retired the Yankees on three pitches; the Yankees were ahead 16–4 at the time and Terrell hurled on an emergency basis.

After his playing days, Terrell was a longtime scout, working for both the Royals and Twins, as well as the Montreal Expos.
