= Vic Albury =

American baseball player

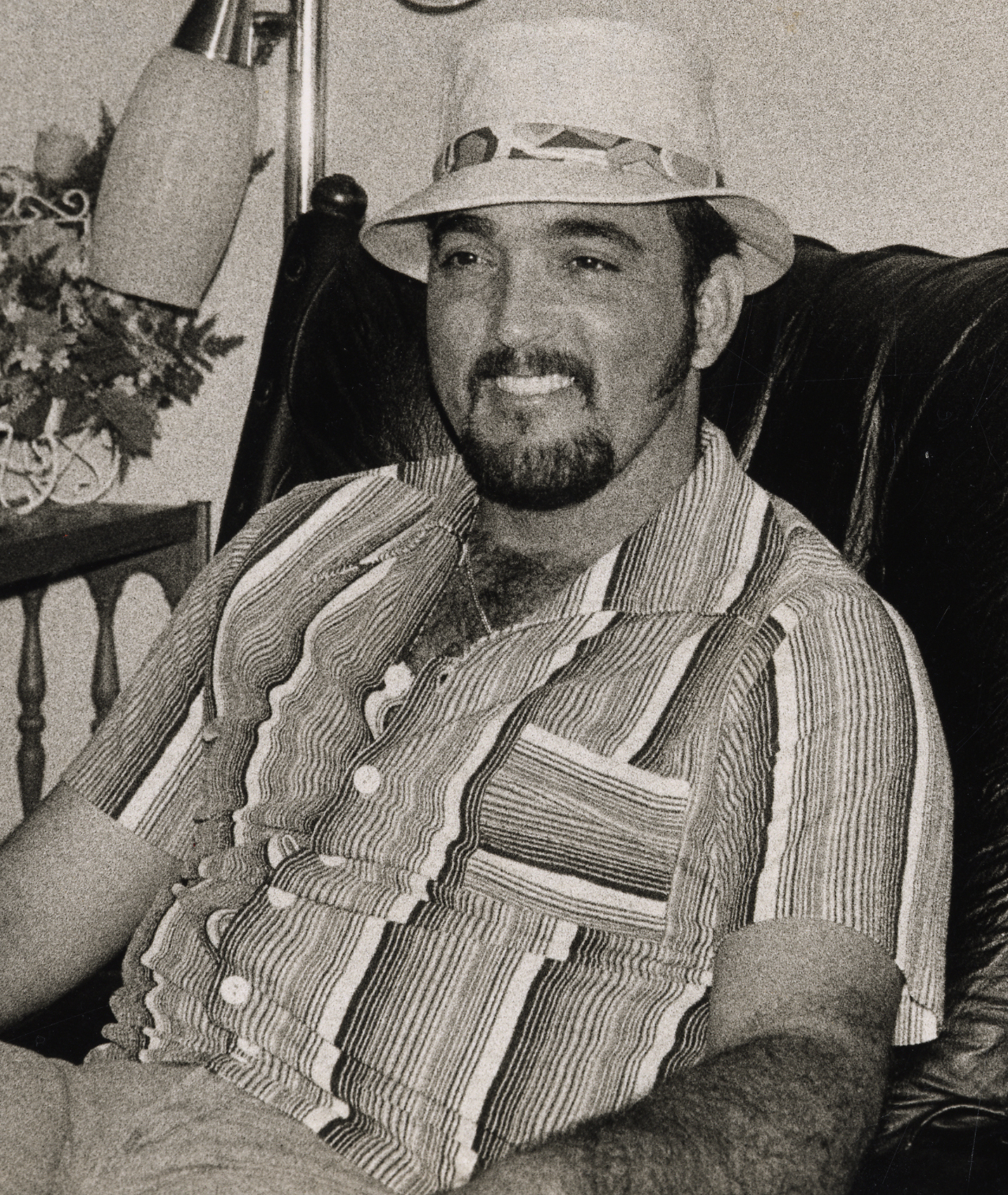
- Albury in 1977
- Pitcher
- Born: May 12, 1947; Key West, Florida, U.S.
- Died: April 18, 2017 (aged 69); Tampa, Florida, U.S.
- Batted: Left Threw: Left

MLB debut
- August 7, 1973, for the Minnesota Twins

Last MLB appearance
- September 26, 1976, for the Minnesota Twins

MLB statistics
- Win–loss record: 18–17
- Earned run average: 4.11
- Strikeouts: 193
- Stats at Baseball Reference

Teams
- Minnesota Twins (1973–1976)

Victor Albury (May 12, 1947 – April 18, 2017) was an American professional baseball pitcher. He played in four seasons with the Minnesota Twins, appearing in 101 games and amassing a career record of 18–17. In 1975, Albury finished ninth in the American League in walks allowed, with 97. Albury was selected by the Cleveland Indians in the ninth round (173rd overall) of the 1965 draft out of Key West High School, but never played in the majors with the Indians.
