= Dan Monzon =

American baseball player (1946-1996)

- Monzon with the Minnesota Twins
- Infielder
- Born: May 17, 1946; Bronx, New York, U.S.
- Died: January 21, 1996 (aged 49); Santo Domingo, Dominican Republic
- Batted: Right Threw: Right

MLB debut
- April 25, 1972, for the Minnesota Twins

Last MLB appearance
- September 30, 1973, for the Minnesota Twins

MLB statistics
- Batting average: .244
- Home runs: 0
- Hits: 32
- Stats at Baseball Reference

Teams
- Minnesota Twins (1972–1973)

Daniel Francisco Monzon (May 17, 1946 – January 21, 1996) was an American professional baseball infielder, manager and scout. A third baseman, primarily in minor league baseball, he appeared in 94 games for the Minnesota Twins of Major League Baseball (MLB) in 1972 and 1973. Listed at 5 feet 9 inches (1.75 m) and 175 pounds (79 kg), he threw and batted right-handed.

== Playing career ==
Monzon was born in the Bronx, New York. He graduated from James Monroe High School in 1964 and attended Buena Vista College in Storm Lake, Iowa. He was drafted by the Minnesota Twins in the second round of the secondary phase of the 1967 MLB draft, and enjoyed his finest professional season that year with the Class A Short Season Auburn Twins, leading the New York–Penn League in runs scored, total bases, and triples, tying for the lead in RBIs, and finishing second in batting average (.338).

Monzon also enjoyed stellar seasons in the Double-A Southern League and Triple-A Pacific Coast League. His two seasons with the major league Twins saw him play a utility role, appearing at second and third base, shortstop, and in the outfield. He batted .244 with no home runs and nine RBIs in 131 at bats in 94 MLB games. He returned to the minor leagues in 1974, where he played through the 1977 season.

== Post-playing career ==
Monzon's managing career began in 1978 in the New York Mets organization, where he directed teams at the Class A and Class A Short Season levels from 1978 to 1982. He then became a scout, based in Florida and covering Latin America for the Mets, Chicago Cubs, Milwaukee Brewers and Chicago White Sox. In 1995, he was named supervisor of Latin American scouting by the Boston Red Sox, but in his second year in that job, he was fatally injured in an automobile accident in Santo Domingo, Dominican Republic, at the age of 49.
