= Larry Hisle =

American baseball player (born 1947)

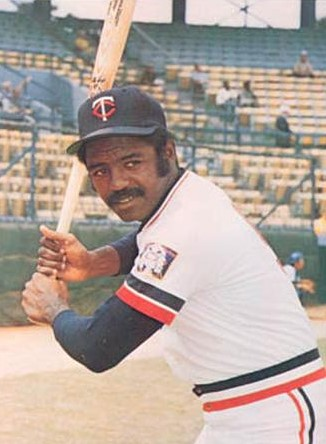
- Outfielder
- Born: May 5, 1947 (age 79); Portsmouth, Ohio, U.S.
- Batted: Right Threw: Right

MLB debut
- April 10, 1968, for the Philadelphia Phillies

Last MLB appearance
- May 6, 1982, for the Milwaukee Brewers

MLB statistics
- Batting average: .273
- Home runs: 166
- Runs batted in: 674
- Stats at Baseball Reference

Teams
- Philadelphia Phillies (1968–1971); Minnesota Twins (1973–1977); Milwaukee Brewers (1978–1982)

Career highlights and awards
- 2× All-Star (1977, 1978); 2× World Series champion (1992, 1993); AL RBI leader (1977)

Larry Eugene Hisle (/ˈhaɪsəl/ HY-səl; born May 5, 1947) is an American former professional baseball player and hitting coach. He played in Major League Baseball (MLB) as an outfielder for the Philadelphia Phillies (1968–71), Minnesota Twins (1973–77), and Milwaukee Brewers (1978–82). A two-time All-Star, he was the 1977 American League (AL) RBI champion. As a coach, Hisle was a member of two World Series-winning teams for the Toronto Blue Jays.

== Playing career ==
Hisle was drafted by the Phillies in the second round of the 1965 MLB draft as the 38th overall pick. He signed in August and made his professional debut with the Class A Huron Phillies in 1966. Hisle made his MLB debut on April 10, 1968 and played in seven games before being sent back down to the minors. Hisle played his first full season in 1969, when he batted .266 with 20 home runs and finished fourth in NL Rookie of the Year voting. His average plummeted to .204 over the next two seasons and he was subsequently traded to the Los Angeles Dodgers on October 21, 1971. He spent all of the 1972 with the Triple-A Albuquerque Dukes, where he batted .325 with 23 home runs, 91 runs batted in and 20 stolen bases over 131 games. After the 1972 season, the Dodgers traded Hisle to the St. Louis Cardinals. Just over a month later, on November 29, 1972, he was traded again, along with John Cumberland to the Minnesota Twins for Wayne Granger.

In a spring training game for the Minnesota Twins on March 6, 1973, Hisle was MLB's first designated hitter; in five at bats, he hit two home runs (one of them a grand slam) and had seven RBIs. A month later, Ron Blomberg of the New York Yankees would become the first DH in a regular-season game. That year, Hisle hit .272 with 15 home runs. He remained a reliable member of the Twins' lineup throughout the mid-1970s, and hit for the cycle on June 4, 1976. Hisle's best season with the Twins came in 1977, when he hit .302 with 28 home runs and an AL-leading 119 RBIs, as well as being named to his first All-Star Game.

After the 1977 season, Hisle became a free agent and signed with the Milwaukee Brewers. In 1978, Hisle turned in another productive year as he hit .290 and finished third in AL MVP voting. His 34 home runs, 115 RBIs and 96 runs scored placed second, third, and fifth in the American League respectively. A torn rotator cuff suffered in 1979 limited Hisle's playing time for the remainder of his career, as he played in only 79 games over his final four seasons before retiring in 1982.

== Post-playing career ==
Hisle was the hitting coach for the Toronto Blue Jays from 1992 through 1995, helping them to World Series titles in 1992 and 1993. Under his coaching in 1993, Toronto players John Olerud, former Brewers teammate Paul Molitor, and Roberto Alomar finished 1-2-3 in the American League in batting average.

As of 2019, Hisle is employed with the Milwaukee Brewers as Manager of Youth Outreach, and is the president of Major League Mentoring in Milwaukee.

== See also ==
- List of Major League Baseball players to hit for the cycle
- List of Major League Baseball annual runs batted in leaders

Achievements
| Preceded by Tim Foli | Hitting for the cycle June 4, 1976 | Succeeded by Mike Phillips |
