= Danny Fife =

American baseball player (1949–2024)

- Pitcher
- Born: October 5, 1949; Harrisburg, Illinois, U.S.
- Died: May 30, 2024 (aged 74)
- Batted: Right Threw: Right

MLB debut
- August 18, 1973, for the Minnesota Twins

Last MLB appearance
- April 24, 1974, for the Minnesota Twins

MLB statistics
- Win–loss record: 3–2
- Earned run average: 5.43
- Strikeouts: 21
- Stats at Baseball Reference

Teams
- Minnesota Twins (1973–1974)

Danny Wayne Fife (October 5, 1949 – May 30, 2024) was a Major League Baseball pitcher who played for the Minnesota Twins in 1973 and 1974.

A three-sport standout at Clarkston High School (MI), Fife played 3 years of varsity basketball and baseball at the University of Michigan. He served as basketball captain in his senior year. Fife was drafted in the 1971 NBA draft by the Milwaukee Bucks and also by the Detroit Tigers in the major league baseball draft. Choosing baseball as his immediate career path, Fife signed with the Tigers and was traded to the Minnesota Twins right before the 1973 season. A sore arm ended Fife's baseball career prematurely after the 1975 season.

Fife returned to the University of Michigan as an assistant basketball coach. In 1983, Fife went back to his high school alma mater as the varsity basketball coach, where he remained for the next 36 years. In those years, Fife crafted a remarkable record of 29 league championships, 30 district titles, 13 regional titles and 2 state championships. He retired in 2018 as the third winningest coach in Michigan high school basketball history with 701 victories.

Fife was inducted to the Michigan Sports Hall of Fame in 2019. He died from complications of Alzheimer's disease on May 30, 2024, at the age of 74.
