= Phil Roof =

American baseball player and coach (born 1941)

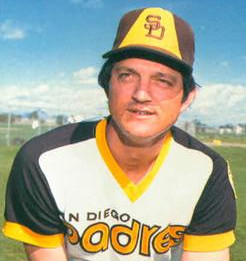
- Roof in 1978
- Catcher
- Born: March 5, 1941 (age 84); Paducah, Kentucky, U.S.
- Batted: Right Threw: Right

MLB debut
- April 29, 1961, for the Milwaukee Braves

Last MLB appearance
- May 30, 1977, for the Toronto Blue Jays

MLB statistics
- Batting average: .215
- Home runs: 43
- Runs batted in: 210
- Stats at Baseball Reference

Teams
- Milwaukee Braves (1961, 1964); Los Angeles Angels (1965); Cleveland Indians (1965); Kansas City / Oakland Athletics (1966–1969); Milwaukee Brewers (1970–1971); Minnesota Twins (1971–1976); Chicago White Sox (1976); Toronto Blue Jays (1977)

Philip Anthony Roof (born March 5, 1941) is an American former professional baseball player, coach and minor league manager. He played for 15 seasons as a catcher in Major League Baseball in 1961 and from 1964 to 1977, most notably for the Kansas City/Oakland Athletics and the Minnesota Twins. Although Roof did not produce impressive offensive statistics, he excelled defensively as a catcher which enabled him to sustain a lengthy career in the major leagues due to his valuable defensive abilities. He was the first player acquired by the expansion Toronto Blue Jays.

== Early years ==
Roof was born in Paducah, Kentucky. He signed with the Milwaukee Braves in 1959 upon graduation from St. Mary High School. His brother, Paul, a pitcher, signed with the Braves out of high school the following year.

After two minor league seasons in which he batted .236 with eleven home runs, Phil Roof debuted with the Braves at just nineteen years of age as a September call-up in 1960, but did not appear in a game. The following season, he made his major league debut on April 29, catching the ninth inning of a 7–3 loss to Juan Marichal and the San Francisco Giants. He saw action immediately, as the Giants half of the ninth ended with Roof tagging out Jim Davenport on a play at the plate. However, he did not get the opportunity to bat, and was left standing in the on-deck circle when the game ended. After appearing in just the one game, he was optioned to the Yakima Braves of the Northwest League on the cutdown date.

Roof again appeared in a single game for the Braves in 1964, this time starting the game behind the plate and making two plate appearances. Roof finished the season with the Denver Bears, and was traded to the Los Angeles Angels with Ron Piché for a player to be named later (relief pitcher Dan Osinski) at the end of the season. While he appeared in just two games with the Braves, he provided his original franchise with a memorable moment off the field when he and future Baseball Hall of Famer Warren Spahn were arrested at a Houston night club a week into the 1964 season.

Roof appeared in nine games for the Angels in 1965 before he was shipped to the Cleveland Indians at the trade deadline for a player to be named later (this time, outfielder Bubba Morton) and cash. He finished the season with the Indians, batting .162 with three runs batted in between his two clubs. At the Winter meetings, he and Joe Rudi were traded to the Kansas City Athletics for Jim Landis and Jim Rittwage.

== Kansas City/Oakland Athletics ==
Roof got off to a fast start with his new franchise, and soon won the starting catching job over incumbent Billy Bryan. His first major league home run was an extra innings game winner against the Washington Senators on May 23, 1966. A week later, he broke up a Denny McLain no-hitter with a two-run double. For the season, he posted career-highs in games played (127), hits (77), doubles (14) and RBIs (44).

Roof remained the Athletics' starting catcher until a torn muscle in his left shoulder early in the 1968 season limited him to just 34 games the Athletics' first season in their new home, Oakland, California. He returned to starting duties in 1969, but was traded to the Seattle Pilots in January 1970 in a package for All-Star first baseman Don Mincher.

== Milwaukee Brewers/Minnesota Twins ==
The Pilots moved to Milwaukee during spring training, 1970, and were renamed the Milwaukee Brewers. The Brewers narrowly avoided 100 losses in 1970 despite the fact that Roof hit a career-high thirteen home runs. He suffered a concussion early in the 1971 season after getting hit on the helmet by a pitch thrown by Minnesota Twins pitcher Bert Blyleven. Ironically, Roof was dealt to the Twins for fellow catcher Paul Ratliff three months later, and caught Blyleven in his second game with the Twins.

Roof spent most of his five seasons in Minnesota as the backup to Glenn Borgmann. He had his only career multi-home run game on May 30, 1972 against the Kansas City Royals, and had arguably his best season in a backup role in 1975, when he batted .302 with seven home runs and 21 RBIs in 63 games.

== Chicago White Sox/Toronto Blue Jays ==
When top prospect catcher Butch Wynegar joined the Twins for the 1976 season, Roof became the odd man out, and was eventually placed on waivers and selected by the Chicago White Sox.

Roof became the first player for the Toronto Blue Jays when they acquired him for a player to be named later two weeks before the 1976 Major League Baseball expansion draft. The player they eventually named was pitcher Larry Anderson. Roof only played in three games for the Blue Jays, appearing in his final major league game on May 30, 1977, at the age of 36, although he remained with the club as a bullpen catcher / coach throughout the season.

== Career statistics ==
In a fifteen-year major league career, Roof played in 857 games, accumulating 463 hits in 2,151 at bats for a .215 career batting average along with 43 home runs, 210 runs batted in and an on-base percentage of .283. He ended his career with a .986 fielding percentage. Roof was rated as a good defensive player with a strong throwing arm, finishing second among American League catchers in caught stealing percentage in 1974 with a 48.8% success rate.

== Coaching and managing career ==
Roof also served as bullpen coach for the San Diego Padres (1978), Seattle Mariners (1983–88) and Chicago Cubs (1990–91).

He managed for 16 years in the Twins organization and won his 1,000th game as a manager in 2004 before his retirement in 2005.

Roof served as the bullpen coach for the Minnesota Twins during spring training and in the first month of the 2011 season while Rick Stelmaszek was recovering from eye surgery.

Roof worked as a spring training coach during retirement until March 2020 when the season was put on hold for COVID-19.

== Personal life ==
Roof's first wife, Marie, died after a lengthy cancer battle in 2005 while he was managing the Rochester Red Wings, Minnesota's Triple-A affiliate. They had been married 41 years with four daughters, then later married his second wife, Linda, in 2007. They have seven children and seventeen grandchildren between them. Three of Roof's grandchildren have played college baseball at Western Kentucky University, University of North Carolina at Charlotte and University of Missouri at St. Louis.

His brother, Gene, played in the majors from 1981 through 1983 with the St. Louis Cardinals and Montreal Expos, and later was an MLB coach and minor league manager and instructor for the Detroit Tigers.

In addition to Paul and Gene, brothers Adrian and David played professional baseball. Gene's sons Shawn and Eric were infielders in the Tigers' organization, and Gene's son, Jonathan, an outfielder and infielder, had a seven-year pro career. Shawn Roof was the 2019 manager of the Visalia Rawhide, a minor league affiliate of the Arizona Diamondbacks. He is currently working his way up through the minor leagues and is the head coach for the Amarillo Sod Poodles, AA affiliate for the Diamondbacks. The elder Roofs' first cousin, Eddie Haas, is a former major league player, coach, scout and manager; another cousin, Louis Haas, played minor league baseball.
