= Jim Strickland (baseball) =

American baseball player (born 1946)

- Pitcher
- Born: June 12, 1946 (age 80); Los Angeles, California, U.S.
- Batted: Left Threw: Left

MLB debut
- May 19, 1971, for the Minnesota Twins

Last MLB appearance
- September 28, 1975, for the Cleveland Indians

MLB statistics
- Win–loss record: 4–2
- Earned run average: 2.68
- Innings pitched: 77⅓
- Stats at Baseball Reference

Teams
- Minnesota Twins (1971–1973); Cleveland Indians (1975)

James Michael Strickland (born June 12, 1946) is an American former professional baseball player. A left-handed pitcher, he appeared in 60 Major League games, all in relief, over four seasons for the Minnesota Twins (1971–1973) and Cleveland Indians (1975).

The 6 ft (1.8 m), 170 lb (77 kg) Strickland allowed 63 hits and 44 bases on balls in 77⅓ MLB innings pitched. He struck out 60 and earned five saves.
