= Dick Woodson =

American baseball player (born 1945)

- Pitcher
- Born: March 30, 1945 (age 81); Oelwein, Iowa, U.S.
- Batted: Right Threw: Right

MLB debut
- April 8, 1969, for the Minnesota Twins

Last MLB appearance
- July 8, 1974, for the New York Yankees

MLB statistics
- Win–loss record: 34–32
- Earned run average: 3.47
- Strikeouts: 315
- Stats at Baseball Reference

Teams
- Minnesota Twins (1969–1970, 1972–1974); New York Yankees (1974)

Richard Lee Woodson (born March 30, 1945) is an American former professional baseball pitcher. A right-hander, he played all or part of five seasons in Major League Baseball for the Minnesota Twins (1969–70 and 1972–74) and the New York Yankees (1974). Woodson was listed as 6' 5" in height, and 207 lb. in weight.

== Major league career ==
Before the 1965 baseball season, Woodson was signed by the Minnesota Twins as an amateur free agent to play in their Minor League Baseball organization. He played three-plus seasons in minor league baseball before making the Twins roster out of spring training in 1969.

=== Major league debut ===
He made his major league debut on April 8, 1969 at age 24 with the Minnesota Twins. On that day, the Minnesota Twins were playing against the Kansas City Royals at Municipal Stadium, with 17,688 people attending the game. The game reached extra innings. Woodson was called to replace Joe Grzenda pitching and batting 9th in the top of the twelfth inning. He finished the game, allowing only one hit, as the Twins lost to the Royals, 4-3.

=== 1970-73 ===
Woodson pitched in the League Championship Series in each of his first two Major League seasons, 1969 and 1970. He went 7-5 in 1969 as both a starting and a relief pitcher. After spending 1971 in the minor leagues, he returned as a full-time starter in 1972, going 14-14. The next season, he was 10-8 despite missing all of September due to injury.

=== Making history ===
On February 11, 1974, Dick Woodson became the first player to invoke the new free agency clause, as he sought $30,000, and the Twins offered $23,000. The arbitrator sided with Woodson. On May 4, 1974, Woodson was traded by the Minnesota Twins to the New York Yankees for Mike Pazik, along with some cash. Woodson played his final major league game on July 8, 1974 with the Yankees. He pitched in the minor leagues in 1975 in the Texas Rangers and Atlanta Braves organizations before retiring.
