= Eric Soderholm =

American baseball player (born 1948)

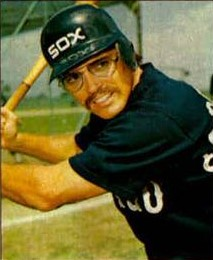
- Third baseman
- Born: September 24, 1948 (age 77); Cortland, New York, U.S.
- Batted: Right Threw: Right

MLB debut
- September 3, 1971, for the Minnesota Twins

Last MLB appearance
- October 5, 1980, for the New York Yankees

MLB statistics
- Batting average: .264
- Home runs: 102
- Runs batted in: 383
- Stats at Baseball Reference

Teams
- Minnesota Twins (1971–1975); Chicago White Sox (1977–1979); Texas Rangers (1979); New York Yankees (1980)

Eric Thane Soderholm (born September 24, 1948) is an American former Major League Baseball third baseman who played for the Minnesota Twins, Chicago White Sox, Texas Rangers, and New York Yankees from 1971 to 1980. Soderholm was selected with the 1st overall selection in the secondary phase of the 1968 Free Agent draft by the Twins.

Soderholm won the Twins regular job at third base in 1974 and had two solid seasons as their starter. He then injured his knee and missed the entire 1976 campaign. The White Sox took a gamble and signed Soderholm as a free agent in November 1976. The move paid off as Soderholm responded with a career year in 1977, hitting .280 and slugging 25 home runs. Soderholm stroked 16 of his 25 homers after the All-Star break to help keep the South Side Hitmen, as the Sox were fondly known that year, in the AL West pennant race into September. Soderholm was named the AL Comeback Player of the Year by The Sporting News after the 1977 campaign.

Soderholm hit another 20 home runs in 1978 for the White Sox. During the 1979 season, Soderholm was dealt to the Texas Rangers in exchange for Ed Farmer. Soderholm was dealt again after the 1979 season to the New York Yankees where he finished out his playing career as a part-time designated hitter. He was invited to Chicago Cubs spring training in 1982, but after many surgeries his beat-up knees could no longer handle the stress of everyday playing.

After retiring from baseball in early 1982, Cubs GM Dallas Green hired Soderholm to scout American League teams for the Cubs. At the same time, Soderholm started his Eric Soderholm (youth) Baseball Camps, which led to him becoming a private hitting instructor. Eric also went on to own Soderworld, a healing arts center, in Willowbrook, Illinois, a western suburb of Chicago.
