= Ray Christensen =

American sportscaster (1924–2017)

- Born: May 6, 1924; Minneapolis, Minnesota, U.S.
- Died: February 5, 2017 (aged 92); Rosemount, Minnesota, U.S.
- Education: University of Minnesota (1949)
- Occupation: Sportscaster
- Years active: 1946–2001
- Employer: WCCO

Raymond P. "Ray" Christensen (May 6, 1924 – February 5, 2017) was an American sportscaster who was the play-by-play announcer for the Minnesota Golden Gophers sports teams from 1951 until 2001, working for WCCO in Minneapolis starting in 1963.

Christensen was born in 1924 in Minneapolis and attended Roosevelt High School. A 1949 graduate of the University of Minnesota, he also served with the United States Army in World War II. In 2002, he was inducted into the Minnesota Broadcasting Hall of Fame. Christensen also worked games for the Minnesota Twins, Minnesota Vikings, and Minneapolis Lakers. In addition to his sports coverage, Christensen hosted a daily music appreciation segment on WCCO-AM titled "Musing on Music." Christensen would play a brief excerpt of a classical music piece and then report on its history and other musicology. He died on February 5, 2017, at the age of 92 from an upper respiratory infection in Rosemount, Minnesota, where he lived.
