= Steve Brye =

American baseball player (born 1949)

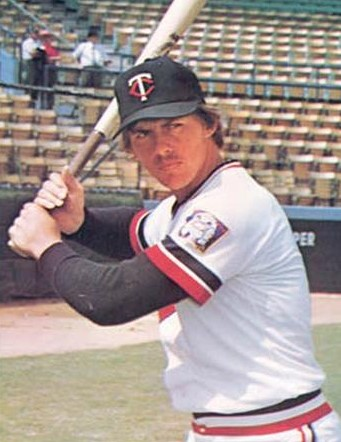
- Outfielder
- Born: February 4, 1949 (age 77); Alameda, California, U.S.
- Batted: Right Threw: Right

MLB debut
- September 3, 1970, for the Minnesota

Last MLB appearance
- October 1, 1978, for the Pittsburgh Pirates

MLB statistics
- Batting average: .258
- Home runs: 30
- Runs batted in: 193
- Stats at Baseball Reference

Teams
- Minnesota Twins (1970–1976); Milwaukee Brewers (1977); Pittsburgh Pirates (1978)

Stephen Robert Brye (born February 4, 1949) is an American former professional baseball outfielder who played in Major League Baseball from 1970 through 1978. He played for the Minnesota Twins, Milwaukee Brewers, and Pittsburgh Pirates.

== Career ==
On June 6, 1967, Brye was drafted by the Minnesota Twins in the first round of the amateur draft. He signed to play in the minor leagues in the Twins organization.

Brye made his major league debut on September 3, 1970, with the Twins at age 21. He was hitless in his only at bat in his debut. That year, Brye had a batting average of .182 in 11 at-bats. In 1971, he hit .224 in 107 at-bats. The next year, he hit .241 in 253 at-bats. Brye hit .263 in 278 at-bats in 1973. In 1974 he won the starting centerfield job in spring training, and he hit .283 in 488 at-bats. Also, Brye was the Twins leader in doubles in his only season as a starter. The next year, however, he hit .252 in 246 at-bats. The next year, he hit .264 in 258 at-bats. On March 21, 1977, Brye was purchased from the Twins by the Brewers. In 1977, he hit .249 in 241 at-bats. On March 30, 1978, Brye was released by the Brewers. Five days later, he signed with the Pirates, only to be released a few months later. In 1978, he hit .235 in 115 at-bats. On February 7, 1979, he was signed by the San Diego Padres. However, he retired before he could play with the Padres.

Brye had a career batting average of .258, and finished with 1,997 at-bats in 697 games. He drove in 193 runs during his career. Brye hit 30 home runs over the course of his career. His lifetime fielding percentage was .991.

== Controversy ==
Brye was involved in one of the biggest controversies in baseball on the final day of the 1976 season. Kansas City's George Brett and Hal McRae were in a near deadlock for the American League batting championship. In his final at-bat, Brett hit a routine fly-ball to left field that Brye failed to catch, and it fell for a hit. There were accusations that Brye played it badly to deny McRae, an African American, the batting championship. Within baseball circles, rumours persisted that Brye didn't see McRae as an equal to Brett because Brett played defense, whereas McRae was a designated hitter. It was never conclusively established that Brye intentionally failed to retire Brett.

== Statistics ==
Career Statistics:

G	AB	H	2B	3B	HR	R	RBI	BB	SO	AVG	OBP	SLG	OPS	FP
697	1997	515	97	13	30	237	193	144	276	.258	.309	.365	.674	.991
