= Vern Morgan =

American baseball player (1928–1975)

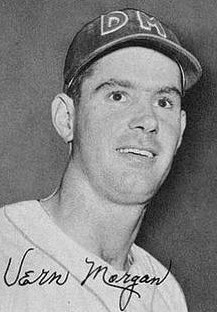
- Third baseman
- Born: August 8, 1928; Emporia, Virginia, U.S.
- Died: November 8, 1975 (aged 47); Minneapolis, Minnesota, U.S.
- Batted: Left Threw: Right

MLB debut
- August 10, 1954, for the Chicago Cubs

Last MLB appearance
- May 1, 1955, for the Chicago Cubs

MLB statistics
- Batting average: .225
- Home runs: 0
- Runs batted in: 3
- Stats at Baseball Reference

Teams
- As player: Chicago Cubs (1954–1955); As coach: Minnesota Twins (1969–1975)

Vernon Thomas Morgan (August 8, 1928 – November 8, 1975) was an American third baseman and coach in Major League Baseball, and a manager and longtime player (1948–64) at the minor league level. A native of Emporia, Virginia, who attended the University of Richmond, Morgan threw right-handed, batted left-handed, stood 6 ft 1 in (1.85 m) (185 cm) tall and weighed 185 pounds (84 kg).

Morgan's Major League playing career consisted of 31 games and 71 at bats for the 1954–1955 Chicago Cubs. Morgan collected 16 hits, including two doubles, and drove in three runs, batting .225. In 1956, he was acquired by the Washington Senators organization, and he would spend the rest of his baseball career in the employ of the franchise (which became the Minnesota Twins in 1961). Morgan played for the Senators' Double-A farm club, the Chattanooga Lookouts of the Southern Association, from 1956 through mid-1960. As a 28-year-old veteran, Morgan had his best minor-league season for the 1957 Lookouts, batting .332 with 14 home runs and 92 RBI and making the SA all-star team as an outfielder.

Morgan would play in the minor leagues for 15 seasons and bat .301 in 5,273 at bats, but he never made Washington's Major League roster and in 1961 he became a manager in the newly relocated Twins' farm system. Morgan managed for eight seasons in the Alabama–Florida League, Northern League and Carolina League — compiling a won/loss mark of 488–540 (.475) — until he was appointed to the Minnesota MLB coaching staff for 1969. He served as the Twins' first base coach for almost seven seasons, until he was forced to the sidelines by kidney disease in September 1975. Morgan received a kidney transplant during the autumn of 1975, but his body rejected it and he died in Minneapolis on November 8 at the age of 47.
