= Glenn Borgmann =

American baseball player (born 1950)

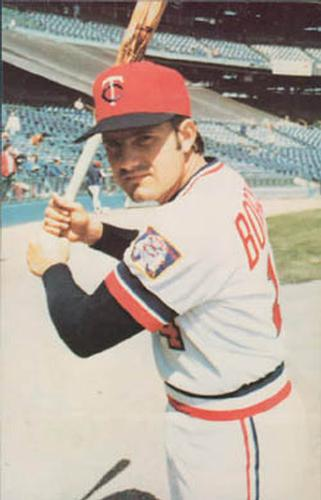
- Catcher
- Born: May 25, 1950 (age 76); Paterson, New Jersey, U.S.
- Batted: Right Threw: Right

MLB debut
- July 1, 1972, for the Minnesota Twins

Last MLB appearance
- October 5, 1980, for the Chicago White Sox

MLB statistics
- Batting average: .229
- Home runs: 16
- Runs batted in: 151
- Stats at Baseball Reference

Teams
- Minnesota Twins (1972–1979); Chicago White Sox (1980)

Glenn Dennis Borgmann (born May 25, 1950) is an American former professional baseball player. He played nine seasons in Major League Baseball as a catcher from 1972 until 1980 and was South Alabama's first All-American. He played the majority of his career for the Minnesota Twins before playing his final season with the Chicago White Sox.

Borgmann was born in Paterson, New Jersey. He attended Eastside High School and was drafted out of the University of South Alabama by the Minnesota Twins in the first round of the secondary phase of the 1971 Major League Baseball draft. A little over a year later, he made his major league debut for the Twins. He became the team's starting catcher during the second half of 1972, replacing the platoon of Phil Roof and George Mitterwald.

After spending most of 1973 in the minor leagues, Borgmann was back in the majors for good in 1974. That season, he took over as the club's starting catcher, batting .252 in 128 games while leading all American League catchers with a .997 fielding percentage. After seeing his average slip to .207 in 1975, Borgmann lost the starting job to rookie Butch Wynegar in 1976. He spent four seasons as Wynegar's backup, then became a free agent.

Borgmann signed with the Chicago White Sox in 1980. After starting the season in the minors, Borgmann was called up in August to replace Ricky Seilheimer as the main backup to starting catcher Bruce Kimm. In September, he split time behind the plate with Marv Foley. Borgmann became a free agent again after the season.

In 1981, Borgmann signed a minor league contract with the Cleveland Indians, playing 11 games for their Triple-A farm club, the Charleston Charlies, ending his professional career.
