= Ray Corbin =

American baseball player (born 1949)

- Pitcher
- Born: February 12, 1949 (age 77); Live Oak, Florida, U.S.
- Batted: Right Threw: Right

MLB debut
- April 6, 1971, for the Minnesota Twins

Last MLB appearance
- July 28, 1975, for the Minnesota Twins

MLB statistics
- Win–loss record: 36–38
- Earned run average: 3.84
- Strikeouts: 348
- Stats at Baseball Reference

Teams
- Minnesota Twins (1971–1975)

Alton Ray Corbin (born February 12, 1949) is an American former Major League Baseball pitcher who appeared in 181 games for the Minnesota Twins from 1971 to 1975. The right-hander was listed as 6 feet 2 inches (1.88 m) tall and 200 pounds (91 kg).

Born in Live Oak, Florida, Corbin signed with the Twins out of high school as an amateur free agent prior to the 1967 season; he attended Florida Gateway College and North Florida Community College. He made his major league debut on opening day April 6, 1971, pitching the final two innings in relief during a 7–2 loss to the Milwaukee Brewers.

Corbin served as both a starter (63 starts, 12 complete games, three shutouts) and reliever (62 games finished, 17 saves) during his five MLB seasons, all with the Twins, compiling a 36–38 won–lost record and a career 3.84 earned run average. He allowed 638 hits and 261 bases on balls, with 348 strikeouts, in 6521/3 innings pitched.
