= Jim Holt (baseball) =

American baseball player (1944–2019)

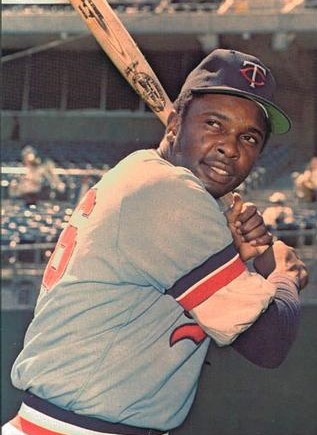
- Holt in 1973
- Outfielder / First baseman
- Born: May 27, 1944; Graham, North Carolina, U.S.
- Died: March 29, 2019 (aged 74); Burlington, North Carolina, U.S.
- Batted: Left Threw: Right

MLB debut
- April 17, 1968, for the Minnesota Twins

Last MLB appearance
- October 3, 1976, for the Oakland Athletics

MLB statistics
- Batting average: .265
- Home runs: 19
- Runs batted in: 177
- Stats at Baseball Reference

Teams
- Minnesota Twins (1968–1974); Oakland Athletics (1974–1976)

Career highlights and awards
- World Series champion (1974)

James William Holt (May 27, 1944 – March 29, 2019) was an American professional baseball player. An outfielder and first baseman, he was drafted by the Kansas City Athletics in 1965, but his career was delayed by service in the Vietnam War. He played with the Minnesota Twins from 1968 to 1974 and Oakland Athletics from 1974 to 1976.

== Career ==
He graduated from Graham High School (North Carolina), also known as Graham Colored High School, and was drafted by the Kansas City Athletics in 1965. He was also drafted by the U.S. and his subsequent service in the Vietnam War delayed the start of his professional baseball career. He made his major league debut on April 17, 1968, and played his last game on October 3, 1976.

On the Arizona Instructional League team in 1967, Holt batted a team-best .367 on the Athletics' affiliated squad that also included Vida Blue, Bert Campaneris, Rollie Fingers, and Reggie Jackson. Holt was an outfielder and first baseman with the Minnesota Twins from 1968 to 1974 and Oakland Athletics from 1974 to 1976. As a member of the 1974 World Series champion Athletics, he had a pinch-hit single in game two, which the Athletics lost to the Dodgers. He drove in 2 runs with a pinch-hit single in game four, which the A's won. He had a career batting average of .265 with 19 home runs and 177 runs batted in in 707 games. He was good defensively, recording a career .993 fielding percentage playing at all three outfield positions and first base. In 3621.1 innings in the field, Holt committed only 12 errors. He played in 4 World Series games and 8 American League Championship Series games.

After his major league career ended, he played with the Chihuahua Dorados in 1977 and the Monterrey Sultanes in 1978, both in the Mexican League Northeast.

He died on March 29, 2019, at 2:08 pm in the small Osceola Community, North Carolina; which is, located just north of the city of Burlington, in Alamance County.
