= Ralph Rowe =

Rowe

Ralph Emanuel Rowe (July 14, 1924 – February 29, 1996) was an American outfielder and manager in minor league baseball, and a coach at the Major League level. A native of Newberry, South Carolina, Rowe threw right-handed, batted left-handed, stood 5 feet 6 inches (1.68 m) tall and weighed 175 pounds (79 kg).

He was signed at age 17 by the Cleveland Indians after graduating from Newberry High School in 1942. Rowe's professional career got off to a rousing start in 1942, when he batted .357 for the Thomasville Hi-Toms, a Cleveland affiliate in the Class D North Carolina State League. But he lost the next four full seasons (1943–1946) to military service and, despite batting .360 and leading the 1948 Class B Tri-State League in runs batted in (123), he spent most of his playing career at the Double-A level. Rowe's career reached its apex with a 14-game trial with the Los Angeles Angels of the Triple-A Pacific Coast League in 1949. In 1951, while playing for the Nashville Vols, Rowe was named to the Southern Association All-Star team. He played in the farm systems of the Indians, Chicago Cubs, Chicago White Sox and Washington Senators through 1958, then became a manager in the Washington/Minnesota Twins farm system from 1959 to 1971, winning four league championships. His overall record was 836–757 (.525).

At age 47, he reached the Major Leagues as a coach, serving for four seasons with the Twins (1972–1975) as their third base coach, and four more (1981–1984) as the batting coach of the Baltimore Orioles. He was a member of the Orioles' staff during their 1983 world championship season. Rowe also served as a roving minor league batting coach for the Twins, Orioles, and, after 1984, the Montreal Expos.

Rowe moved his family to Charlotte, North Carolina, after he played for the baseball Hornets in 1958. While living in Charlotte, he was a player-coach for the Hornets in 1961, and managed the 1969 Hornets to the Double-A Southern League championship. After returning to his home town of Newberry in 1974, he lived there until his death in 1996 at age 71.

Preceded by Al Federoff	Portland Beavers manager 1971	Succeeded by Ray Hathaway
Preceded by Frankie Crosetti	Minnesota Twins third base coach 1972–1975	Succeeded by Joe Nossek
Preceded by Frank Robinson	Baltimore Orioles hitting coach 1981–1984	Succeeded by Terry Crowley
