= Herb Carneal =

American sportscaster (1923–2007)

- Born: Charles Herbert Carneal; May 10, 1923; Richmond, Virginia, U.S.
- Died: April 1, 2007 (aged 83); Minnetonka, Minnesota, U.S.
- Spouse: Katherine Meredith (m. 1950; died 2000)
- Children: 1
- Sports commentary career
- Teams: Philadelphia Phillies; Philadelphia Athletics; Baltimore Orioles; Minnesota Vikings; Minnesota Twins
- Genre: Play-by-play
- Sports: Major League Baseball; National Football League

Charles Herbert Carneal (May 10, 1923 – April 1, 2007) was an American Major League Baseball sportscaster. From 1962 through 2006, he was a play-by-play voice of Minnesota Twins radio broadcasts, becoming the lead announcer in 1967 after Ray Scott left to work exclusively with CBS. Prior to 1962, he broadcast for the Baltimore Orioles, partnering with Ernie Harwell from 1957 to 1959 and with Bob Murphy in 1960–1961. His mellow baritone voice and laid-back demeanor were well loved by Twins fans and formed a well balanced team with the more excitable and emotional style of his longtime broadcast partner John Gordon. Carneal was for many years known (and introduced as such by Gordon at the beginning of each game) as "The Voice of the Twins". Carneal's trademark greeting, "Hi everybody", was reminiscent of his down-home style.

A Richmond, Virginia, native, Carneal first broadcast major league games for the Philadelphia Athletics and Philadelphia Phillies in 1954. From 1957 to 1961 he was employed by the Baltimore Orioles. He also called games on CBS television for the Minnesota Vikings of the National Football League in the team's first four years of existence (1961–64), and AFL games on NBC in 1965.

Carneal's announcing career received a significant boost when he took over the Twins broadcasts, as it united him with broadcaster Halsey Hall, after whom many major league broadcasters have modeled their work. Hall's influence on Carneal's career development is legendary.

Carneal received the Ford C. Frick Award from the Baseball Hall of Fame in 1996, and was inducted into the Pavek Museum of Broadcasting's Hall of Fame in 2004. He was named Minnesota Sportscaster of the Year 20 times by the National Sportscasters and Sportswriters Association.

Beginning in 2002, Carneal scaled back his workload to providing play-by-play for half of Minnesota's home games. By 2007, he was scheduled to work only 36 games. Until 2007, Carneal worked in partnership with fellow radio commentators John Gordon and Dan Gladden.

In 2002, Carneal was inducted into the Virginia Sports Hall of Fame.

Herb Carneal died on April 1, 2007, of congestive heart failure. The Twins dedicated their 2007 season to Carneal, wearing patches on their sleeves in his honor.
