= 1978 Minnesota Twins season =

1978 Minnesota Twins
- League: American League
- Division: West
- Ballpark: Metropolitan Stadium
- City: Bloomington, Minnesota
- Owners: Calvin Griffith (majority owner, with Thelma Griffith Haynes)
- General manager: Calvin Griffith
- Manager: Gene Mauch
- Television: WTCN (Harmon Killebrew, Joe Boyle)
- Radio: 830 WCCO AM (Herb Carneal, Frank Quilici)

The 1978 Minnesota Twins season was the 18th season for the Minnesota Twins franchise in the Twin Cities of Minnesota, their 18th season at Metropolitan Stadium and the 78th overall in the American League. The Twins finished with 73 wins and 89 losses, 4th place in the American League West Division.

== Offseason ==
- October 3, 1977: Jim Hughes was released by the Twins.
- October 3, 1977: Steve Luebber was released by the Twins.
- October 25, 1977: Bombo Rivera was purchased by the Twins from the Montreal Expos.
- December 6, 1977: Jesús Vega was drafted by the Twins from the Milwaukee Brewers in the minor league draft.
- January 10, 1978: Jesse Orosco was drafted by the Twins in the 2nd round of the 1978 Major League Baseball draft.
- March 23, 1978: Don Carrithers was released by the Twins.

== Regular season ==
On May 7, shortstop Roy Smalley Jr. set a Twins record by drawing five walks in a 15–9 win over the Baltimore Orioles. Smalley went 1 for 1 and scored three times.

Third baseman Mike Cubbage, on July 27, became the fifth Twin to hit for the cycle (following Rod Carew, 1970; César Tovar, 1972; Larry Hisle, 1976 and Lyman Bostock, 1976). Cubbage went double, homer, single, triple off Toronto Blue Jays' pitching. In subsequent years, five others will match the feat: Gary Ward, 1980; Kirby Puckett, 1986; Carlos Gómez, 2008; Jason Kubel, 2009; and Michael Cuddyer, 2009.

787,878 fans attended Twins games, the second lowest total in the American League. Only one Twins player made the All-Star Game: first baseman Rod Carew. In that game at San Diego Stadium, Carew—in his twelfth consecutive All-Star appearance—performed an All-Star first by hitting two triples in the game.

Carew won his seventh AL batting title with a .333 average, leading the team in hits and runs scored. Shortstop Roy Smalley hit 19 HR and collected 77 RBI. Dan Ford hit 11 HR and collected 82 RBI.

Reliever Mike Marshall was signed in May and replaced Tom Johnson and Bill Campbell as manager Gene Mauch's all-purpose reliever. Marshall went on to rack up 10 relief wins along with 21 saves. Three starters had double digit wins: Dave Goltz (15–10), Roger Erickson (14–13), and Geoff Zahn (14-14).

=== Season standings ===
AL West
Team	W	L	Pct.	GB	Home	Road
Kansas City Royals	92	70	.568	—	56‍–‍25	36‍–‍45
Texas Rangers	87	75	.537	5	52‍–‍30	35‍–‍45
California Angels	87	75	.537	5	50‍–‍31	37‍–‍44
Minnesota Twins	73	89	.451	19	38‍–‍43	35‍–‍46
Chicago White Sox	71	90	.441	20½	38‍–‍42	33‍–‍48
Oakland Athletics	69	93	.426	23	38‍–‍42	31‍–‍51
Seattle Mariners	56	104	.350	35	32‍–‍49	24‍–‍55

=== Record vs. opponents ===
1978 American League record Sources:
Team	BAL	BOS	CAL	CWS	CLE	DET	KC	MIL	MIN	NYY	OAK	SEA	TEX	TOR
Baltimore	—	7–8	4–6	8–1	9–6	7–8	2–8	7–8	5–5	6–9	11–0	9–1	7–4	8–7
Boston	8–7	—	9–2	7–3	7–8	12–3	4–6	10–5	9–2	7–9	5–5	7–3	3–7	11–4
California	6–4	2–9	—	8–7	6–4	4–7	9–6	5–5	12–3	5–5	9–6	9–6	5–10	7–3
Chicago	1–8	3–7	7–8	—	8–2	2–9	8–7	4–7	8–7	1–9	7–8	7–8	11–4	4–6
Cleveland	6–9	8–7	4–6	2–8	—	5–10	5–6	5–10	5–5	6–9	4–6	8–1	1–9	10–4
Detroit	8–7	3–12	7–4	9–2	10–5	—	4–6	7–8	4–6	4–11	6–4	8–2	7–3	9–6
Kansas City	8–2	6–4	6–9	7–8	6–5	6–4	—	6–4	7–8	6–5	10–5	12–3	7–8	5–5
Milwaukee	8–7	5–10	5–5	7–4	10–5	8–7	4–6	—	4–7	10–5	9–1	5–5	6–4	12–3
Minnesota	5–5	2–9	3–12	7–8	5–5	6–4	8–7	7–4	—	3–7	9–6	6–9	6–9	6–4
New York	9–6	9–7	5–5	9–1	9–6	11–4	5–6	5–10	7–3	—	8–2	6–5	6–4	11–4
Oakland	0–11	5–5	6–9	8–7	6–4	4–6	5–10	1–9	6–9	2–8	—	13–2	6–9	7–4
Seattle	1–9	3–7	6–9	8–7	1–8	2–8	3–12	5–5	9–6	5–6	2–13	—	3–12	8–2
Texas	4–7	7–3	10–5	4–11	9–1	3–7	8–7	4–6	9–6	4–6	9–6	12–3	—	4–7
Toronto	7–8	4–11	3–7	6–4	4–10	6–9	5–5	3–12	4–6	4–11	4–7	2–8	7–4	—

=== Opening Day starters ===
- Rod Carew
- Dan Ford
- Craig Kusick
- Willie Norwood
- Bob Randall
- Bombo Rivera
- Roy Smalley
- Larry Wolfe
- Butch Wynegar
- Geoff Zahn

=== Notable transactions ===
- May 15, 1978: Mike Marshall was signed as a free agent by the Twins.
- June 6, 1978: 1978 Major League Baseball draft
  - Lenny Faedo was drafted by the Twins in the 1st round (16th pick).
  - Kent Hrbek was drafted by the Twins in the 17th round.

=== Roster ===
1978 Minnesota Twins
**Roster**
**Pitchers**: 19 Roger Erickson; 30 Dave Goltz; 37 Roric Harrison; 21,36 Jeff Holly; 31 Darrell Jackson; 27 Dave Johnson; 21 Tom Johnson; 33,28 Mike Marshall; 39 Stan Perzanowski; 17 Pete Redfern; 28 Mac Scarce; 20 Gary Serum; 40 John Sutton; 18 Greg Thayer; 23 Paul Thormodsgard; 38 Geoff Zahn	**Catchers**: 14 Glenn Borgmann; 16 Butch Wynegar; **Infielders**: 29 Rod Carew; 26 Mike Cubbage; 22 Craig Kusick; 34 José Morales; 32 Bob Randall; 5 Roy Smalley; 7 Rob Wilfong; 1 Larry Wolfe	**Outfielders**: 8 Glenn Adams; 12 Rich Chiles; 33 Dave Edwards; 15 Dan Ford; 24 Willie Norwood; 10 Hosken Powell; 9 Bombo Rivera	**Manager**: 4 Gene Mauch; **Coaches**: 41 Karl Kuehl; 6 Tony Oliva; 42 Camilo Pascual; 43 Jerry Zimmerman

=== Game log ===
Legend
	Twins win
	Twins loss
	Postponement
**Bold**	Twins team member

1978 game log: 73–89 (Home: 38–43; Away: 35–46)
April: 8–16 (Home: 3–8; Away: 5–8)

#	Date	Opponent	Score	Win	Loss	Save	Attendance	Record	Streak
1	April 5	@ Mariners	2–3	Abbott (1–0)	**Goltz** (0–1)	Romo (1)	45,235	0–1	L1
2	April 6	@ Mariners	5–4	**Erickson** (1–0)	Pole (0–1)	**T. Johnson** (1)	10,311	1–1	W1
3	April 7	@ Mariners	3–6	Honeycutt (1–0)	**Redfern** (0–1)	Romo (2)	11,530	1–2	L1
4	April 8	@ Mariners	8–2	**Thormodsgard** (1–0)	Mitchell (0–1)		12,896	2–2	W1
5	April 9	@ Mariners	8–6	**Serum** (1–0)	House (0–1)		11,803	3–2	W2
6	April 10	@ Angels	0–3	Brett (1–0)	**Goltz** (0–2)		10,074	3–3	L1
7	April 11	@ Angels	8–1	**Erickson** (2–0)	Aase (0–1)		12,217	4–3	W1
8	April 12	@ Angels	5–9	Tanana (2–0)	**Redfern** (0–2)	LaRoche (2)	12,295	4–4	L1
9	April 13	@ Angels	0–1 (11)	LaRoche (1–0)	**T. Johnson** (0–1)		11,702	4–5	L2
10	April 14	Mariners	14–5	**Zahn** (1–0)	House (0–2)		17,425	5–5	W1
11	April 15	Mariners	6–5 (11)	**T. Johnson** (1–1)	Montague (0–1)		7,471	6–5	W2
12	April 16	Mariners	5–8	Pole (1–2)	**Erickson** (2–1)	Rawley (1)	–	6–6	L1
13	April 16	Mariners	2–7	House (1–2)	**D. Johnson** (0–1)		14,021	6–7	L2
14	April 17	Athletics	2–7	Broberg (2–0)	**Thormodsgard** (1–1)		2,054	6–8	L3
—	April 18	Athletics	Postponed (rain); Makeup: August 11						
15	April 19	Athletics	5–6 (11)	Sosa (1–0)	**T. Johnson** (1–2)		1,935	6–9	L4
16	April 21	Angels	2–3	Aase (1–1)	**Goltz** (0–3)	LaRoche (3)	4,516	6–10	L5
17	April 22	Angels	3–5	Tanana (4–0)	**Erickson** (2–2)	Hartzell (3)	6,566	6–11	L6
—	April 23	Angels	Postponed (rain); Makeup: June 22						
—	April 24	@ Athletics	Postponed (rain); Makeup: April 25						
18	April 25	@ Athletics	3–5	Sosa (2–0)	**Thayer** (0–1)		–	6–12	L7
19	April 25	@ Athletics	3–4 (14)	Coleman (1–0)	**T. Johnson** (1–3)		4,808	6–13	L8
20	April 26	@ Athletics	8–9 (12)	Coleman (2–0)	**T. Johnson** (1–4)		4,127	6–14	L9
21	April 27	@ Athletics	6–1	**Serum** (2–0)	Wirth (1–2)		4,645	7–14	W1
22	April 28	Yankees	1–3	Figueroa (3–1)	**Thormodsgard** (1–2)		11,674	7–15	L1
23	April 29	Yankees	3–1	**Zahn** (2–0)	Tidrow (1–2)		10,543	8–15	W1
24	April 30	Yankees	2–3	Gossage (1–3)	**Scarce** (0–1)		13,929	8–16	L1

May: 11–12 (Home: 4–5; Away: 7–7)

#	Date	Opponent	Score	Win	Loss	Save	Attendance	Record	Streak
25	May 3	@ Red Sox	9–11	Burgmeier (1–0)	**D. Johnson** (0–2)	Stanley (2)	16,403	8–17	L2
26	May 4	@ Red Sox	1–8	Eckersley (1–1)	**Thormodsgard** (1–3)		15,784	8–18	L3
27	May 5	@ Orioles	1–2	Flanagan (2–3)	**Zahn** (2–1)		3,897	8–19	L4
28	May 6	@ Orioles	8–7	**Thayer** (1–1)	Stanhouse (0–2)	**T. Johnson** (2)	26,870	9–19	W1
29	May 7	@ Orioles	15–9	**Scarce** (1–1)	Palmer (3–2)		8,923	10–19	W2
—	May 8	@ Yankees	Postponed (rain); Makeup: July 30						
30	May 9	@ Yankees	1–3	Hunter (2–3)	**Thormodsgard** (1–4)	Lyle (5)	11,271	10–20	L1
31	May 10	@ White Sox	2–7	Wortham (1–1)	**Erickson** (2–3)		8,338	10–21	L2
—	May 11	@ White Sox	Postponed (rain); Makeup: June 25						
—	May 12	Red Sox	Postponed (rain); Makeup: July 24						
32	May 13	Red Sox	2–4	Torrez (5–1)	**Zahn** (2–2)	Burgmeier (2)	7,914	10–22	L3
33	May 14	Red Sox	2–6	Eckersley (3–1)	**Thormodsgard** (1–5)	Burgmeier (3)	7,008	10–23	L4
34	May 15	Orioles	9–6 (10)	**Marshall** (1–0)	Flinn (1–1)		3,847	11–23	W1
35	May 16	Orioles	8–1	**Goltz** (1–3)	Palmer (3–4)	**T. Johnson** (3)	4,893	12–23	W2
36	May 18	@ Royals	8–6	**Zahn** (3–2)	Leonard (3–7)	**Marshall** (1)	17,459	13–23	W3
37	May 19	@ Royals	5–3	**Erickson** (3–3)	Pattin (1–1)	**Marshall** (2)	31,574	14–23	W4
38	May 20	@ Royals	3–6	Gale (4–0)	**Thormodsgard** (1–6)	Hrabosky (5)	30,312	14–24	L1
39	May 21	@ Royals	3–2	**Serum** (3–0)	Splittorff (4–4)	**Marshall** (3)	29,079	15–24	W1
40	May 22	Rangers	2–0	**Zahn** (4–2)	Matlack (4–5)	**Marshall** (4)	6,108	16–24	W2
41	May 23	Rangers	5–2	**Erickson** (4–3)	Umbarger (2–3)		6,791	17–24	W3
42	May 24	Rangers	2–3 (11)	Lindblad (1–0)	**Marshall** (1–1)	Medich (1)	7,598	17–25	L1
43	May 25	Rangers	1–7	Jenkins (5–2)	**Serum** (3–1)		7,644	17–26	L2
—	May 26	Royals	Postponed (rain); Makeup: August 16						
—	May 27	Royals	Postponed (rain); Makeup: September 22						
44	May 28	Royals	7–8 (12)	Gura (3–1)	**Marshall** (1–2)		22,266	17–27	L3
45	May 29	@ Rangers	1–7	D. Ellis (3–2)	**Serum** (3–2)		–	17–28	L4
46	May 29	@ Rangers	7–2	**Erickson** (5–3)	Umbarger (2–4)	**Marshall** (5)	28,317	18–28	W1
47	May 30	@ Rangers	2–0	**Zahn** (5–2)	Jenkins (5–3)	**Marshall** (6)	12,718	19–28	W2

June: 11–13 (Home: 4–5; Away: 7–8)

#	Date	Opponent	Score	Win	Loss	Save	Attendance	Record	Streak
48	June 1	@ Rangers	7–10	Comer (1–1)	**Marshall** (1–3)		16,084	19–29	L1
49	June 2	@ Tigers	4–2	**Erickson** (6–3)	Billingham (4–3)	**Marshall** (7)	21,127	20–29	W1
50	June 3	@ Tigers	9–2	**Goltz** (2–3)	Sykes (3–3)		21,227	21–29	W2
51	June 4	@ Tigers	4–6	Morris (1–1)	**Zahn** (5–3)		36,575	21–30	L1
52	June 7	White Sox	3–8	Kravec (4–4)	**Erickson** (6–4)		6,627	21–31	L2
53	June 8	White Sox	1–2	Wood (6–5)	**Goltz** (2–4)	Willoughby (5)	11,071	21–32	L3
54	June 9	@ Indians	3–7	Clyde (4–0)	**Zahn** (5–4)	Kern (4)	8,390	21–33	L4
55	June 10	@ Indians	3–4	Wise (4–9)	**Marshall** (1–4)	Kern (5)	16,048	21–34	L5
56	June 11	@ Indians	1–2 (10)	Paxton (3–3)	**Marshall** (1–5)		25,547	21–35	L6
—	June 12	@ Blue Jays	Postponed (rain); Makeup: June 13						
57	June 13	@ Blue Jays	2–0	**Goltz** (3–4)	Moore (2–1)	**Marshall** (8)	–	22–35	W1
58	June 13	@ Blue Jays	7–2	**Zahn** (6–4)	Clancy (4–5)		14,489	23–35	W2
59	June 14	Indians	8–2	**Erickson** (7–4)	Clyde (4–1)		6,612	24–35	W3
—	June 15	Indians	Postponed (rain); Makeup: September 3						
60	June 16	Tigers	5–2	**Jackson** (1–0)	Rozema (2–3)		9,479	25–35	W4
61	June 17	Tigers	3–1	**Zahn** (7–4)	Wilcox (3–5)		9,807	26–35	W5
62	June 18	Tigers	8–4	**Goltz** (4–4)	Slaton (6–4)	**Marshall** (9)	21,480	27–35	W6
63	June 20	Angels	5–10	Tanana (11–3)	**Erickson** (7–5)		12,330	27–36	L1
64	June 21	Angels	2–5	Aase (4–3)	**Zahn** (7–5)		10,801	27–37	L2
65	June 22	Angels	2–4 (12)	LaRoche (6–3)	**Marshall** (1–6)		7,488	27–38	L3
66	June 23	@ White Sox	2–1	**Goltz** (5–4)	Kravec (6–5)		28,082	28–38	W1
67	June 24	@ White Sox	4–7	Wood (7–5)	**Jackson** (1–1)	LaGrow (8)	27,433	28–39	L1
68	June 25	@ White Sox	8–5	**Marshall** (2–6)	Schueler (3–2)		–	29–39	W1
69	June 25	@ White Sox	9–6	**Erickson** (8–5)	Hinton (1–1)	**Marshall** (10)	20,137	30–39	W2
70	June 26	@ Brewers	2–8	Sorensen (10–4)	**Serum** (3–3)		7,988	30–40	L1
71	June 27	@ Brewers	6–13	Replogle (4–1)	**Goltz** (5–5)		16,137	30–41	L2
—	June 30	White Sox	Postponed (rain); Makeup: July 2						

July: 15–15 (Home: 9–7; Away: 6–8)

#	Date	Opponent	Score	Win	Loss	Save	Attendance	Record	Streak
72	July 1	White Sox	10–0	**Goltz** (6–5)	Barrios (5–8)		7,533	31–41	W1
73	July 2	White Sox	5–8	Wood (9–5)	**Zahn** (7–6)	Willoughby (10)	–	31–42	L1
74	July 2	White Sox	9–5	**Marshall** (3–6)	Schueler (3–3)		26,897	32–42	W1
75	July 3	Brewers	7–2	**Erickson** (9–5)	Augustine (9–9)		19,062	33–42	W2
76	July 4	Brewers	7–2	**Serum** (4–3)	Travers (4–4)		26,263	34–42	W3
77	July 5	Brewers	3–1	**Goltz** (7–5)	Sorensen (11–5)		11,409	35–42	W4
78	July 7	@ Athletics	3–2	**Zahn** (8–6)	Renko (3–4)	**Marshall** (11)	–	36–42	W5
79	July 7	@ Athletics	1–0	**Jackson** (2–1)	Langford (1–7)		7,239	37–42	W6
80	July 8	@ Athletics	9–8 (11)	**Marshall** (4–6)	Heaverlo (3–4)		12,201	38–42	W7
81	July 9	@ Athletics	7–0	**Goltz** (8–5)	Broberg (9–7)		4,720	39–42	W8
ASG	July 11	AL @ NL	3–7	Sutter (1–0)	Gossage (0–1)		51,549	—	N/A
82	July 13	@ Orioles	6–8	Flanagan (13–6)	**Goltz** (8–6)	T. Martinez (3)	8,119	39–43	L1
83	July 14	@ Orioles	1–5	McGregor (9–8)	**Zahn** (8–7)		24,195	39–44	L2
84	July 15	@ Red Sox	4–5	Lee (10–3)	**Jackson** (2–2)	Stanley (6)	32,861	39–45	L3
85	July 16	@ Red Sox	3–5	Eckersley (11–2)	**Harrison** (0–1)	Campbell (4)	–	39–46	L4
86	July 16	@ Red Sox	2–3	Wright (5–1)	**Erickson** (9–6)	Stanley (7)	35,589	39–47	L5
87	July 17	@ Red Sox	2–3 (10)	Campbell (6–5)	**Marshall** (4–7)		33,233	39–48	L6
88	July 19	Yankees	0–2	Figueroa (8–7)	**Zahn** (8–8)		29,591	39–49	L7
89	July 20	Yankees	0–4	Guidry (14–1)	**Jackson** (2–3)		30,660	39–50	L8
90	July 21	Orioles	4–5 (10)	Stanhouse (4–5)	**Marshall** (4–8)		14,702	39–51	L9
91	July 22	Orioles	5–4	**Goltz** (9–6)	McGregor (10–9)		10,063	40–51	W1
92	July 23	Orioles	5–8	Palmer (12–8)	**Serum** (4–4)	Stanhouse (13)	30,896	40–52	L1
93	July 24	Red Sox	5–4	**Jackson** (3–3)	Drago (2–4)	**Marshall** (12)	–	41–52	W1
94	July 24	Red Sox	2–4	Hassler (2–4)	**Zahn** (8–9)	Stanley (8)	21,580	41–53	L1
95	July 25	Red Sox	5–2	**Erickson** (10–6)	Lee (10–5)	**Marshall** (13)	18,608	42–53	W1
96	July 26	Blue Jays	1–5	Moore (5–2)	**Goltz** (9–7)		6,014	42–54	L1
97	July 27	Blue Jays	6–3	**Perzanowski** (1–0)	Clancy (7–8)		18,285	43–54	W1
98	July 28	@ Yankees	7–5 (10)	**Marshall** (5–8)	Lyle (7–2)		25,037	44–54	W2
99	July 29	@ Yankees	3–7	Clay (2–3)	**Jackson** (3–4)	Gossage (15)	46,711	44–55	L1
100	July 30	@ Yankees	3–4	Gossage (7–9)	**Marshall** (5–9)		–	44–56	L2
101	July 30	@ Yankees	2–0	**Goltz** (10–7)	Beattie (2–5)	**Marshall** (14)	41,491	45–56	W1

August: 13–19 (Home: 9–9; Away: 4–10)

#	Date	Opponent	Score	Win	Loss	Save	Attendance	Record	Streak
102	August 1	@ Mariners	6–13	House (5–4)	**Perzanowski** (1–1)		9,272	45–57	L1
103	August 2	@ Mariners	1–3	Colborn (3–8)	**Zahn** (8–10)		8,394	45–58	L2
104	August 3	@ Mariners	5–6	Romo (9–3)	**Marshall** (5–10)		9,471	45–59	L3
105	August 4	@ Angels	3–12	Fitzmorris (1–1)	**Serum** (4–5)	Brett (1)	17,411	45–60	L4
106	August 5	@ Angels	4–3	**Erickson** (11–6)	Tanana (14–7)		–	46–60	W1
107	August 5	@ Angels	3–4	Knapp (11–6)	**Perzanowski** (1–2)	LaRoche (16)	41,723	46–61	L1
108	August 6	@ Angels	3–4	LaRoche (8–5)	**Marshall** (5–11)		17,628	46–62	L2
109	August 7	Mariners	5–6 (14)	Todd (2–3)	**Perzanowski** (1–3)		6,657	46–63	L3
110	August 8	Mariners	10–2	**Serum** (5–5)	Honeycutt (4–7)		6,499	47–63	W1
111	August 9	Mariners	1–4	Abbott (5–9)	**Erickson** (11–7)	Todd (2)	6,814	47–64	L1
112	August 11	Athletics	0–2	Langford (6–7)	**Zahn** (8–11)		–	47–65	L2
113	August 11	Athletics	3–2	**Jackson** (4–4)	Broberg (9–10)	**Marshall** (15)	13,795	48–65	W1
114	August 12	Athletics	6–3	**Perzanowski** (2–3)	Renko (6–7)	**Marshall** (16)	11,740	49–65	W2
115	August 13	Athletics	3–1	**Serum** (6–5)	Keough (7–10)		–	50–65	W3
116	August 13	Athletics	2–1	**Erickson** (12–7)	Norris (0–1)		18,577	51–65	W4
117	August 14	@ Indians	3–4	Paxton (9–6)	**Holly** (0–1)	Kern (10)	6,513	51–66	L1
118	August 15	@ Indians	9–8	**Marshall** (6–11)	Monge (3–2)	**Serum** (1)	6,971	52–66	W1
119	August 16	Royals	5–1	**Zahn** (9–11)	Bird (4–6)		–	53–66	W2
120	August 16	Royals	7–11	Splittorff (14–10)	**Perzanowski** (2–4)	Mingori (7)	14,640	53–67	L1
121	August 17	Royals	6–5 (10)	**Erickson** (13–7)	Gura (10–3)		15,936	54–67	W1
122	August 18	Blue Jays	4–3 (10)	**Holly** (1–1)	Murphy (4–9)		4,599	55–67	W2
123	August 19	Blue Jays	5–0	**Serum** (7–5)	Garvin (3–12)		10,745	56–67	W3
124	August 20	Blue Jays	2–6	Kirkwood (2–1)	**Perzanowski** (2–5)	Murphy (7)	11,685	56–68	L1
125	August 21	Tigers	6–9	Billingham (14–5)	**Zahn** (9–12)		7,419	56–69	L2
126	August 22	Tigers	3–7	Slaton (13–9)	**Perzanowski** (2–6)		7,726	56–70	L3
127	August 23	Rangers	0–2	Comer (6–3)	**Erickson** (13–8)		7,157	56–71	L4
128	August 24	Rangers	1–4 (10)	Jenkins (12–8)	**Goltz** (10–8)		8,666	56–72	L5
129	August 25	@ Blue Jays	3–7	Kirkwood (3–1)	**Serum** (7–6)	Willis (7)	15,206	56–73	L6
130	August 26	@ Blue Jays	3–4 (10)	Cruz (5–1)	**Zahn** (9–13)		25,601	56–74	L7
131	August 27	@ Blue Jays	3–2 (11)	**Marshall** (7–11)	Willis (2–6)		22,023	57–74	W1
132	August 29	@ Tigers	2–4	Wilcox (12–8)	**Goltz** (10–9)		13,839	57–75	L1
133	August 31	@ Tigers	4–1	**Zahn** (10–13)	Young (5–4)	**Marshall** (17)	16,995	58–75	W1

September: 15–13 (Home: 9–9; Away: 6–4)

#	Date	Opponent	Score	Win	Loss	Save	Attendance	Record	Streak
134	September 1	Indians	1–4	Clyde (6–9)	**Erickson** (13–9)	Spillner (3)	4,917	58–76	L1
135	September 2	Indians	2–1	**Goltz** (11–9)	Reuschel (2–2)	**Marshall** (18)	6,775	59–76	W1
136	September 3	Indians	12–3	**Serum** (8–6)	Wise (9–18)		–	60–76	W2
137	September 3	Indians	4–3	**Marshall** (8–11)	Kern (8–9)		10,240	61–76	W3
138	September 4	White Sox	2–1	**Zahn** (11–13)	Barrios (8–13)		6,978	62–76	W4
139	September 5	White Sox	3–4	Trout (1–0)	**Erickson** (13–10)	LaGrow (15)	3,630	62–77	L1
140	September 6	White Sox	0–1	Kravec (11–13)	**Goltz** (11–10)		3,648	62–78	L2
141	September 8	Brewers	0–3	Replogle (8–2)	**Serum** (8–7)		9,262	62–79	L3
142	September 9	Brewers	0–3	Caldwell (18–9)	**Erickson** (13–11)		10,639	62–80	L4
143	September 10	Brewers	3–1	**Goltz** (12–10)	Travers (10–9)		10,512	63–80	W1
144	September 11	@ White Sox	3–1	**Zahn** (12–13)	Kravec (11–14)	**Marshall** (19)	7,342	64–80	W2
145	September 12	@ White Sox	1–6	Hinton (2–4)	**Serum** (8–8)		6,279	64–81	L1
146	September 15	@ Brewers	10–3	**Erickson** (14–11)	Travers (10–10)		12,456	65–81	W1
147	September 16	@ Brewers	5–2	**Goltz** (13–10)	Sorensen (17–11)	**Marshall** (20)	37,809	66–81	W2
148	September 17	@ Brewers	4–3	**Serum** (9–8)	Replogle (9–3)	**Marshall** (21)	11,007	67–81	W3
149	September 18	Angels	10–4	**Zahn** (13–13)	Knapp (14–8)	**Perzanowski** (1)	2,278	68–81	W4
150	September 19	Angels	1–4	Ryan (8–13)	**Erickson** (14–12)		3,747	68–82	L1
151	September 20	Rangers	5–3	**Goltz** (14–10)	Comer (9–5)		2,736	69–82	W1
152	September 21	Rangers	3–6	Matlack (14–13)	**Serum** (9–9)		3,312	69–83	L1
153	September 22	Royals	2–4	Gura (15–4)	**Jackson** (4–5)		–	69–84	L2
154	September 22	Royals	4–0	**Zahn** (14–13)	Pattin (3–3)		5,175	70–84	W1
155	September 23	Royals	1–3	Splittorff (19–12)	**Erickson** (14–13)	Hrabosky (20)	13,288	70–85	L1
156	September 24	Royals	6–4	**Goltz** (15–10)	Mingori (1–4)		6,627	71 –85	W1
157	September 25	@ Rangers	2–3 (11)	Cleveland (5–8)	**Marshall** (8–12)		6,404	71–86	L1
158	September 26	@ Rangers	6–2	**Marshall** (9–12)	Mirabella (2–2)		6,797	72–86	W1
159	September 27	@ Rangers	5–10	Mirabella (3–2)	**Perzanowski** (2–7)		9,601	72–87	L1
160	September 29	@ Royals	0–4	Leonard (21–17)	**Jackson** (4–6)		31,794	72–88	L2
161	September 30	@ Royals	7–3 (11)	**Marshall** (10–12)	McGilberry (0–1)		29,089	73–88	W1

October: 0–1 (Home: 0–0; Away: 0–1)

#	Date	Opponent	Score	Win	Loss	Save	Attendance	Record	Streak
162	October 1	@ Royals	0–1	Throop (1–0)	**Zahn** (14–14)	Paschall (1)	23,794	73–89	L1

== Player stats ==
= Indicates team leader

= Indicates league leader

=== Batting ===
==== Starters by position ====
Note: Pos = Position; G = Games played; AB = At bats; H = Hits; Avg. = Batting average; HR = Home runs; RBI = Runs batted in

Pos	Player	G	AB	H	Avg.	HR	RBI
C	Butch Wynegar	135	454	104	.229	4	45
1B	Rod Carew	152	564	188	.333	5	70
2B	Bob Randall	119	330	89	.270	0	21
SS	Roy Smalley	158	586	160	.273	19	77
3B	Mike Cubbage	125	394	111	.282	7	57
LF	Willie Norwood	125	428	109	.255	8	46
CF	Dan Ford	151	592	162	.274	11	82
RF	Hosken Powell	121	381	94	.247	3	31
DH	Glenn Adams	116	310	80	.258	7	35

==== Other batters ====
Note: G = Games played; AB = At bats; H = Hits; Avg. = Batting average; HR = Home runs; RBI = Runs batted in

Player	G	AB	H	Avg.	HR	RBI
Bombo Rivera	101	251	68	.271	3	23
José Morales	101	242	76	.314	2	38
Larry Wolfe	88	235	55	.234	3	25
Rob Wilfong	92	199	53	.266	1	11
Rich Chiles	87	198	53	.268	1	22
Craig Kusick	77	191	33	.173	4	20
Glenn Borgmann	49	123	26	.211	3	15
Dave Edwards	15	44	11	.250	1	3

=== Pitching ===
==== Starting pitchers ====
Note: G = Games pitched; IP = Innings pitched; W = Wins; L = Losses; ERA = Earned run average; SO = Strikeouts

Player	G	IP	W	L	ERA	SO
Roger Erickson	37	265.2	14	13	3.96	121
Geoff Zahn	35	252.1	14	14	3.03	106
Dave Goltz	29	220.1	15	10	2.49	116
Darrell Jackson	19	92.1	4	6	4.48	54
Paul Thormodsgard	12	66.0	1	6	5.05	23

==== Other pitchers ====
Note: G = Games pitched; IP = Innings pitched; W = Wins; L = Losses; ERA = Earned run average; SO = Strikeouts

Player	G	IP	W	L	ERA	SO
Gary Serum	34	184.1	9	9	4.10	80
Stan Perzanowski	13	56.2	2	7	5.24	31
Dave Johnson	6	12.0	0	2	7.50	7
Pete Redfern	3	9.2	0	2	6.52	4

==== Relief pitchers ====
Note: G = Games pitched; W = Wins; L = Losses; SV = Saves; ERA = Earned run average; SO = Strikeouts

Player	G	W	L	SV	ERA	SO
Mike Marshall	54	10	12	21	2.45	56
Greg Thayer	20	1	1	0	3.80	30
Tom Johnson	18	1	4	3	5.51	21
John Sutton	17	0	0	0	3.45	18
Mac Scarce	17	1	1	0	3.94	17
Jeff Holly	15	1	1	0	3.57	12
Roric Harrison	9	0	1	0	7.50	7

== Awards and honors ==
All-Star Game

- Rod Carew, Starter

== Farm system ==
Level	Team	League	Manager
AAA	Toledo Mud Hens	International League	Cal Ermer
AA	Orlando Twins	Southern League	Johnny Goryl
A	Visalia Oaks	California League	Roy McMillan
A	Wisconsin Rapids Twins	Midwest League	Rick Stelmaszek
Rookie	Elizabethton Twins	Appalachian League	Fred Waters

LEAGUE CHAMPIONS: Visalia, Elizabethton
