= 1977 Minnesota Twins season =

1977 Minnesota Twins
- League: American League
- Division: West
- Ballpark: Metropolitan Stadium
- City: Bloomington, Minnesota
- Owners: Calvin Griffith (majority owner, with Thelma Griffith Haynes)
- General managers: Calvin Griffith
- Managers: Gene Mauch
- Television: WTCN (Harmon Killebrew, Joe Boyle)
- Radio: 830 WCCO AM (Herb Carneal, Frank Quilici)

The 1977 Minnesota Twins season was the 17th season for the Minnesota Twins franchise in the Twin Cities of Minnesota, their 17th season at Metropolitan Stadium and the 77th overall in the American League. The Twins finished 84–77, fourth in the American League West.

== Offseason ==
- March 18, 1977: Geoff Zahn was signed as a free agent by the Twins.

== Regular season ==
In a May 25 double-header at Boston's Fenway Park, outfielder Lyman Bostock tied a major league record with twelve putouts in the first game. His total of seventeen putouts over both games set a new American League record.

On June 26, a crowd of 46,463 turned up at Metropolitan Stadium to watch first baseman Rod Carew's pursuit of a .400 batting average. Carew didn't disappoint, going 4 for 5 with six RBI, raising his batting average seven points to .403. Lost in the commotion was right fielder Glenn Adams' own 4-for-5 performance, as he drove in a Twins-record eight runs. The Twins beat the Chicago White Sox 19–12.

Rod Carew, outfielder Larry Hisle and catcher Butch Wynegar were named to the All-Star Game. Carew was the leading AL vote-getter, scoring 405 of 422 possible votes in the national balloting by sports writers and broadcasters.

Carew was named American League Most Valuable Player. In winning his sixth AL batting title, Carew flirted with becoming the first batter since Ted Williams in 1941 to hit .400, finishing at .388. He also had 239 hits, scored a league-leading 128 runs, hit 14 home runs and collected 100 RBI.

Other offensive stars were Larry Hisle, who hit 28 HR and drove in a league-leading 119 runs, and Lyman Bostock, who hit .338 with 104 runs, 14 HR and 90 RBI.

The Twins' ability to score runs was matched by their pitchers' ability to give up runs. Reliever Tom Johnson replaced Bill Campbell, racking up 16 relief wins along with 20 saves. Dave Goltz became a 20-game winner for the first time.

1,162,727 fans attended Twins games, the fourth lowest total in the American League. It was, however, the first time since 1970 that the Twins attracted more than one million fans.

=== Season standings ===
AL West
Team	W	L	Pct.	GB	Home	Road
Kansas City Royals	102	60	.630	—	55‍–‍26	47‍–‍34
Texas Rangers	94	68	.580	8	44‍–‍37	50‍–‍31
Chicago White Sox	90	72	.556	12	48‍–‍33	42‍–‍39
Minnesota Twins	84	77	.522	17½	48‍–‍32	36‍–‍45
California Angels	74	88	.457	28	39‍–‍42	35‍–‍46
Seattle Mariners	64	98	.395	38	29‍–‍52	35‍–‍46
Oakland Athletics	63	98	.391	38½	35‍–‍46	28‍–‍52

=== Record vs. opponents ===
1977 American League record Sources:
Team	BAL	BOS	CAL	CWS	CLE	DET	KC	MIL	MIN	NYY	OAK	SEA	TEX	TOR
Baltimore	—	6–8	5–6	5–5	11–4	12–3	4–7	11–4	6–4	8–7	8–2	7–3	4–6	10–5
Boston	8–6	—	7–3	3–7	8–7	9–6	5–5	9–6	4–6	8–7	8–3	10–1	6–4	12–3
California	6–5	3–7	—	8–7	6–4	4–6	6–9	5–5	7–8	4–7	5–10	9–6	5–10	6–4
Chicago	5–5	7–3	7–8	—	6–4	4–6	8–7	6–5	10–5	3–7	10–5	10–5	6–9	8–3
Cleveland	4–11	7–8	4–6	4–6	—	8–7	3–7	11–4	2–9	3–12	7–3	7–3	2–9	9–5
Detroit	3–12	6–9	6–4	6–4	7–8	—	3–8	10–5	5–5	6–9	5–5	5–6	2–8	10–5
Kansas City	7–4	5–5	9–6	7–8	7–3	8–3	—	8–2	10–5	5–5	9–6	11–4	8–7	8–2
Milwaukee	4–11	6–9	5–5	5–6	4–11	5–10	2–8	—	3–8	8–7	5–5	7–3	5–5	8–7
Minnesota	4–6	6–4	8–7	5–10	9–2	5–5	5–10	8–3	—	2–8	8–6	7–8	8–7	9–1
New York	7–8	7–8	7–4	7–3	12–3	9–6	5–5	7–8	8–2	—	9–2	6–4	7–3	9–6
Oakland	2–8	3–8	10–5	5–10	3–7	5–5	6–9	5–5	6–8	2–9	—	7–8	2–13	7–3
Seattle	3–7	1–10	6–9	5–10	3–7	6–5	4–11	3–7	8–7	4–6	8–7	—	9–6	4–6
Texas	6–4	4–6	10–5	9–6	9–2	8–2	7–8	5–5	7–8	3–7	13–2	6–9	—	7–4
Toronto	5–10	3–12	4–6	3–8	5–9	5–10	2–8	7–8	1–9	6–9	3–7	6–4	4–7	—

=== Notable transactions ===
- April 6, 1977: The Twins purchased the contract of Don Carrithers from the Montreal Expos.
- May 2, 1977: Dave Johnson was purchased by the Twins from the Seattle Mariners.
- June 7, 1977: Darrell Jackson was drafted by the Twins in the 9th round of the 1977 Major League Baseball draft.

=== Roster ===
1977 Minnesota Twins
Roster
Pitchers: 19 Tom Burgmeier; 37 Bill Butler; 18 Don Carrithers; 30 Dave Goltz; 21,36 Jeff Holly; 31 Jim Hughes; 27 Dave Johnson; 21 Tom Johnson; 33 Mike Pazik; 17 Pete Redfern; 34 Ron Schueler; 20 Gary Serum; 28 Jim Shellenback; 23 Paul Thormodsgard; 38 Geoff Zahn	Catchers: 14 Glenn Borgmann; 11 Bud Bulling; 16 Butch Wynegar; Infielders: 29 Rod Carew; 26 Mike Cubbage; 25 Luis Gómez; 22 Craig Kusick; 40 Sam Perlozzo; 32 Bob Randall; 5 Roy Smalley; 1 Jerry Terrell; 7 Rob Wilfong; 39 Larry Wolfe	Outfielders: 8 Glenn Adams; 10 Lyman Bostock; 12 Rich Chiles; 15 Dan Ford; 35 Bob Gorinski; 9 Larry Hisle; 24 Willie Norwood; Other batters: 2 Randy Bass	Manager: 4 Gene Mauch; Coaches: 41 Karl Kuehl; 42 Don McMahon; 6 Tony Oliva; 43 Jerry Zimmerman

== Player stats ==
= Indicates team leader

= Indicates league leader

=== Batting ===
==== Starters by position ====
Note: Pos = Position; G = Games played; AB = At bats; H = Hits; Avg. = Batting average; HR = Home runs; RBI = Runs batted in

Pos	Player	G	AB	H	Avg.	HR	RBI
C	Butch Wynegar	144	532	139	.261	10	79
1B	Rod Carew	156	616	239	.388	14	100
2B	Bob Randall	103	306	73	.239	0	22
3B	Mike Cubbage	129	417	110	.264	9	55
SS	Roy Smalley	150	584	135	.231	6	56
LF	Larry Hisle	141	546	165	.302	28	119
CF	Lyman Bostock	153	593	199	.336	14	90
RF	Dan Ford	144	453	121	.267	11	60
DH	Craig Kusick	115	268	68	.256	12	45

==== Other batters ====
Note: G = Games played; AB = At bats; H = Hits; Avg. = Batting average; HR = Home runs; RBI = Runs batted in

Player	G	AB	H	Avg.	HR	RBI
Glenn Adams	95	269	91	.338	6	49
Rich Chiles	108	261	69	.264	3	36
Jerry Terrell	93	214	48	.224	1	20
Rob Wilfong	73	171	42	.246	1	13
Bob Gorinski	54	118	23	.195	3	22
Willie Norwood	39	83	19	.229	3	9
Luis Gómez	32	65	16	.246	0	11
Glenn Borgmann	17	43	11	.256	2	7
Bud Bulling	15	32	5	.156	0	5
Larry Wolfe	8	25	6	.240	0	6
Sam Perlozzo	10	24	7	.292	0	0
Randy Bass	9	19	2	.105	0	0

=== Pitching ===
==== Starting pitchers ====
Note: G = Games pitched; IP = Innings pitched; W = Wins; L = Losses; ERA = Earned run average; SO = Strikeouts

Player	G	IP	W	L	ERA	SO
Dave Goltz	39	303.0	20	11	3.36	186
Paul Thormodsgard	37	218.0	11	15	4.62	100
Geoff Zahn	34	198.0	12	14	4.68	88
Pete Redfern	30	137.1	6	9	5.18	73
Mike Pazik	3	18.0	1	0	2.50	6

==== Other pitchers ====
Note: G = Games pitched; IP = Innings pitched; W = Wins; L = Losses; ERA = Earned run average; SO = Strikeouts

Player	G	IP	W	L	ERA	SO
Ron Schueler	52	134.2	8	7	4.41	77
Dave Johnson	30	72.2	2	5	4.58	33
Jeff Holly	18	48.1	2	3	6.89	32
Bill Butler	6	21.0	0	1	6.86	5

==== Relief pitchers ====
Note: G = Games pitched; W = Wins; L = Losses; SV = Saves; ERA = Earned run average; SO = Strikeouts

Player	G	W	L	SV	ERA	SO
Tom Johnson	71	16	7	15	3.13	87
Tom Burgmeier	61	6	4	7	5.09	35
Gary Serum	8	0	0	0	4.37	4
Don Carrithers	7	0	1	0	6.91	3
Jim Shellenback	5	0	0	0	7.94	3
Jim Hughes	2	0	0	0	2.08	1

== Awards and honors ==
- Rod Carew, American League batting champion (.388)
- Rod Carew, Roberto Clemente Award
- Rod Carew, American League MVP

== Farm system ==
Level	Team	League	Manager
AAA	Tacoma Twins	Pacific Coast League	Del Wilber and Tom Kelly
AA	Orlando Twins	Southern League	Johnny Goryl
A	Visalia Oaks	California League	Roy McMillan
A	Wisconsin Rapids Twins	Midwest League	Jim Rantz, Carlos Pascual and Spencer "Red" Robbins
Rookie	Elizabethton Twins	Appalachian League	Fred Waters
