= 1976 Minnesota Twins season =

1976 Minnesota Twins
- League: American League
- Division: West
- Ballpark: Metropolitan Stadium
- City: Bloomington, Minnesota
- Owners: Calvin Griffith (majority owner, with Thelma Griffith Haynes)
- General managers: Calvin Griffith
- Managers: Gene Mauch
- Television: WTCN (Harmon Killebrew, Joe Boyle)
- Radio: 830 WCCO AM (Herb Carneal, Frank Quilici)

The 1976 Minnesota Twins season was the 16th season for the Minnesota Twins franchise in the Twin Cities of Minnesota, their 16th season at Metropolitan Stadium and the 76th overall in the American League. The Twins finished 85–77, third in the American League West. Only 715,394 fans attended Twins games, the lowest total in the American League. It was the third year in a row that the Twins attracted the fewest fans in the AL.

== Offseason ==
- October 24, 1975: Sergio Ferrer was traded by the Twins to the Philadelphia Phillies for Larry Cox.
- December 23, 1975: Danny Walton was traded by the Twins to the Los Angeles Dodgers for Bob Randall.
- January 7, 1976: Pete Redfern was drafted by the Twins in the 1st round (1st pick) of the 1976 Major League Baseball draft (secondary phase).
- February 11, 1976: Johnny Briggs was released by the Twins.

== Regular season ==
In June and July, Larry Hisle and Lyman Bostock became the third and fourth Twins to hit for the cycle. Hisle cycled on June 4 in an 8–6 win over Baltimore, going double, triple, single, home run. He is the only Twin that took an extra inning (homering in the tenth) to accomplish the feat, as he'd grounded out in his first at-bat. Six weeks later Bostock became the second Twin to cycle during a season, a first for the club.

Two Twins made the All-Star Game: first baseman Rod Carew and catcher Butch Wynegar.

On July 24, Lyman Bostock, batting fourth, went four-for-four (3B-HR-2B-1B) to become the fourth Twin to hit for the cycle. He had four RBI and scored four runs in the 17–2 win over Chicago.

Steve Luebber is the Minnesota pitcher to come closest to a no-hitter without achieving it. On August 7, he was one out away before losing his bid when Texas Ranger Roy Howell singled. Luebber then lost the shutout when Mike Hargrove singled Howell home. The Twins won the game, 3–1.

For the first time in four years, Carew did not win the AL batting title, finishing third with a .331 batting average. Carew did have 200 hits and 90 RBI. Larry Hisle hit 14 home runs and collected 96 RBI. Dan Ford added 20 HR and 86 RBI. The Twins set a season-record low with just 81 homers.

Reliever Bill Campbell led the Twins pitchers with 17 wins, all in relief. He also led the team in saves (20) and appearances (78). His earned run average of 3.01 was second only to reliever Tom Burgmeier's 2.50; Burgmeier added 8 relief wins and a save. The Twins needed the relief help because the starting pitching was terrible, with only Dave Goltz (14–14) managing double digit wins.

=== Season standings ===
AL West
| Team | W | L | Pct. | GB | Home | Road |
|---|---|---|---|---|---|---|
| Kansas City Royals | 90 | 72 | .556 | — | 49‍–‍32 | 41‍–‍40 |
| Oakland Athletics | 87 | 74 | .540 | 2½ | 51‍–‍30 | 36‍–‍44 |
| Minnesota Twins | 85 | 77 | .525 | 5 | 44‍–‍37 | 41‍–‍40 |
| Texas Rangers | 76 | 86 | .469 | 14 | 39‍–‍42 | 37‍–‍44 |
| California Angels | 76 | 86 | .469 | 14 | 38‍–‍43 | 38‍–‍43 |
| Chicago White Sox | 64 | 97 | .398 | 25½ | 35‍–‍45 | 29‍–‍52 |

=== Record vs. opponents ===
1976 American League record Sources:
| Team | BAL | BOS | CAL | CWS | CLE | DET | KC | MIL | MIN | NYY | OAK | TEX |
|---|---|---|---|---|---|---|---|---|---|---|---|---|
| Baltimore | — | 7–11 | 8–4 | 8–4 | 7–11 | 12–6 | 6–6 | 11–7 | 4–8 | 13–5 | 4–8 | 8–4 |
| Boston | 11–7 | — | 7–5 | 6–6 | 9–9 | 14–4 | 3–9 | 12–6 | 7–5 | 7–11 | 4–8 | 3–9 |
| California | 4–8 | 5–7 | — | 11–7 | 7–5 | 6–6 | 8–10 | 4–8 | 8–10 | 5–7 | 6–12 | 12–6 |
| Chicago | 4–8 | 6–6 | 7–11 | — | 3–9 | 6–6 | 8–10 | 7–5 | 7–11 | 1–11 | 8–9 | 7–11 |
| Cleveland | 11–7 | 9–9 | 5–7 | 9–3 | — | 6–12 | 6–6 | 11–6 | 9–3 | 4–12 | 4–8 | 7–5 |
| Detroit | 6–12 | 4–14 | 6–6 | 6–6 | 12–6 | — | 4–8 | 12–6 | 4–8 | 9–8 | 6–6 | 5–7 |
| Kansas City | 6–6 | 9–3 | 10–8 | 10–8 | 6–6 | 8–4 | — | 8–4 | 10–8 | 7–5 | 9–9 | 7–11 |
| Milwaukee | 7–11 | 6–12 | 8–4 | 5–7 | 6–11 | 6–12 | 4–8 | — | 4–8 | 5–13 | 5–7 | 10–2 |
| Minnesota | 8–4 | 5–7 | 10–8 | 11–7 | 3–9 | 8–4 | 8–10 | 8–4 | — | 2–10 | 11–7 | 11–7 |
| New York | 5–13 | 11–7 | 7–5 | 11–1 | 12–4 | 8–9 | 5–7 | 13–5 | 10–2 | — | 6–6 | 9–3 |
| Oakland | 8–4 | 8–4 | 12–6 | 9–8 | 8–4 | 6–6 | 9–9 | 7–5 | 7–11 | 6–6 | — | 7–11 |
| Texas | 4–8 | 9–3 | 6–12 | 11–7 | 5–7 | 7–5 | 11–7 | 2–10 | 7–11 | 3–9 | 11–7 | — |

=== Notable transactions ===
- May 30, 1976: Jeff Holly was signed as a free agent by the Twins.
- June 1, 1976: Bert Blyleven and Danny Thompson were traded by the Twins to the Texas Rangers for Bill Singer, Roy Smalley, Mike Cubbage, Jim Gideon, and $250,000. On December 10, Thompson died of complications related to his granulocytic leukemia in Rochester, Minnesota.

=== Roster ===
1976 Minnesota Twins
Roster
| Pitchers: 20 Vic Albury; 18 Eddie Bane; 28 Bert Blyleven; 19 Tom Burgmeier; 24 Bill Campbell; 21 Joe Decker; 30 Dave Goltz; 31 Jim Hughes; 21 Tom Johnson; 23 Steve Luebber; 26 Mike Pazik; 17 Pete Redfern; 48 Bill Singer | Catchers: 14 Glenn Borgmann; 8 Phil Roof; 16 Butch Wynegar; Infielders: 29 Rod Carew; 26 Mike Cubbage; 25 Luis Gómez; 22 Craig Kusick; 7 Dave McKay; 32 Bob Randall; 5 Roy Smalley; 1 Jerry Terrell; 5 Danny Thompson | Outfielders: 10 Lyman Bostock; 2 Steve Braun; 11 Steve Brye; 15 Dan Ford; 9 Larry Hisle; 6 Tony Oliva | Manager: 4 Gene Mauch; Coaches: 41 Ed Lyons; 42 Don McMahon; 40 Joe Nossek; 6 Tony Oliva; 43 Jerry Zimmerman |

== Player stats ==
| = Indicates team leader |

=== Batting ===
==== Starters by position ====
Note: Pos = Position; G = Games played; AB = At bats; H = Hits; Avg. = Batting average; HR = Home runs; RBI = Runs batted in

| Pos | Player | G | AB | H | Avg. | HR | RBI |
|---|---|---|---|---|---|---|---|
| C | Butch Wynegar | 149 | 534 | 139 | .260 | 10 | 69 |
| 1B | Rod Carew | 156 | 605 | 200 | .331 | 9 | 90 |
| 2B | Bob Randall | 153 | 475 | 127 | .267 | 1 | 34 |
| 3B | Mike Cubbage | 104 | 342 | 89 | .260 | 3 | 49 |
| SS | Roy Smalley | 103 | 384 | 104 | .271 | 2 | 36 |
| LF | Larry Hisle | 155 | 581 | 158 | .272 | 14 | 96 |
| CF | Lyman Bostock | 128 | 474 | 153 | .323 | 4 | 60 |
| RF | Dan Ford | 145 | 514 | 137 | .267 | 20 | 86 |
| DH | Craig Kusick | 109 | 266 | 69 | .259 | 11 | 36 |

==== Other batters ====
Note: G = Games played; AB = At bats; H = Hits; Avg. = Batting average; HR = Home runs; RBI = Runs batted in

| Player | G | AB | H | Avg. | HR | RBI |
|---|---|---|---|---|---|---|
| Steve Braun | 122 | 417 | 120 | .288 | 3 | 61 |
| Steve Brye | 87 | 258 | 68 | .264 | 2 | 23 |
| Jerry Terrell | 89 | 171 | 42 | .246 | 0 | 8 |
| Dave McKay | 45 | 138 | 28 | .203 | 0 | 8 |
| Danny Thompson | 34 | 124 | 29 | .234 | 0 | 6 |
| Tony Oliva | 67 | 123 | 26 | .211 | 1 | 16 |
| Glenn Borgmann | 24 | 65 | 16 | .246 | 1 | 6 |
| Luis Gómez | 38 | 57 | 11 | .193 | 0 | 3 |
| Phil Roof | 18 | 46 | 10 | .217 | 0 | 4 |

=== Pitching ===
==== Starting pitchers ====
Note: G = Games pitched; IP = Innings pitched; W = Wins; L = Losses; ERA = Earned run average; SO = Strikeouts

| Player | G | IP | W | L | ERA | SO |
|---|---|---|---|---|---|---|
| Dave Goltz | 36 | 249.1 | 14 | 14 | 3.36 | 133 |
| Jim Hughes | 37 | 177.0 | 9 | 14 | 4.98 | 87 |
| Bill Singer | 26 | 172.0 | 9 | 9 | 3.77 | 63 |
| Pete Redfern | 23 | 118.0 | 8 | 8 | 3.51 | 74 |
| Bert Blyleven | 12 | 95.1 | 4 | 5 | 3.12 | 75 |
| Eddie Bane | 17 | 79.1 | 4 | 7 | 5.11 | 24 |
| Joe Decker | 13 | 58.0 | 2 | 7 | 5.28 | 35 |

==== Other pitchers ====
Note: G = Games pitched; IP = Innings pitched; W = Wins; L = Losses; ERA = Earned run average; SO = Strikeouts

| Player | G | IP | W | L | ERA | SO |
|---|---|---|---|---|---|---|
| Steve Luebber | 38 | 119.1 | 4 | 5 | 4.00 | 45 |

==== Relief pitchers ====
Note: G = Games pitched; W = Wins; L = Losses; SV = Saves; ERA = Earned run average; SO = Strikeouts

| Player | G | W | L | SV | ERA | SO |
|---|---|---|---|---|---|---|
| Bill Campbell | 78 | 17 | 5 | 20 | 3.01 | 115 |
| Tom Burgmeier | 57 | 8 | 1 | 1 | 2.50 | 45 |
| Vic Albury | 23 | 3 | 1 | 0 | 3.58 | 23 |
| Tom Johnson | 18 | 3 | 1 | 0 | 2.61 | 37 |
| Mike Pazik | 5 | 0 | 0 | 0 | 7.00 | 6 |

== Farm system ==
| Level | Team | League | Manager |
|---|---|---|---|
| AAA | Tacoma Twins | Pacific Coast League | Cal Ermer |
| AA | Orlando Twins | Southern League | Dick Phillips |
| A | Reno Silver Sox | California League | Johnny Goryl |
| A | Wisconsin Rapids Twins | Midwest League | Harry Warner |
| Rookie | Elizabethton Twins | Appalachian League | Fred Waters |

LEAGUE CHAMPIONS: Reno

Reno affiliation shared with San Diego Padres
