= 1976 Texas Rangers season =

1976 Texas Rangers
- League: American League
- Division: West
- Ballpark: Arlington Stadium
- City: Arlington, Texas
- Record: 76–86 (.469)
- Divisional place: 4th
- Owners: Bradford G. Corbett
- General managers: Dan O'Brien Sr.
- Managers: Frank Lucchesi
- Television: KXAS-TV (Dick Risenhoover, Tom Vandergriff)
- Radio: WBAP (Dick Risenhoover, Bill Merrill)

The 1976 Texas Rangers season was the 16th of the Texas Rangers franchise overall, their 5th in Arlington as the Rangers, and the 5th season at Arlington Stadium. The Rangers finished fourth in the American League West with a record of 76 wins and 86 losses.

== Offseason ==
- November 12, 1975: Dave Nelson was traded by the Rangers to the Kansas City Royals for Nelson Briles.
- December 9, 1975: Stan Thomas and Ron Pruitt were traded by the Rangers to the Cleveland Indians for John Ellis.
- March 12, 1976: Mike Kekich was released by the Rangers.

== Regular season ==
=== Season standings ===
AL West
Team	W	L	Pct.	GB	Home	Road
Kansas City Royals	90	72	.556	—	49‍–‍32	41‍–‍40
Oakland Athletics	87	74	.540	2½	51‍–‍30	36‍–‍44
Minnesota Twins	85	77	.525	5	44‍–‍37	41‍–‍40
Texas Rangers	76	86	.469	14	39‍–‍42	37‍–‍44
California Angels	76	86	.469	14	38‍–‍43	38‍–‍43
Chicago White Sox	64	97	.398	25½	35‍–‍45	29‍–‍52

=== Record vs. opponents ===
1976 American League record Sources:
Team	BAL	BOS	CAL	CWS	CLE	DET	KC	MIL	MIN	NYY	OAK	TEX
Baltimore	—	7–11	8–4	8–4	7–11	12–6	6–6	11–7	4–8	13–5	4–8	8–4
Boston	11–7	—	7–5	6–6	9–9	14–4	3–9	12–6	7–5	7–11	4–8	3–9
California	4–8	5–7	—	11–7	7–5	6–6	8–10	4–8	8–10	5–7	6–12	12–6
Chicago	4–8	6–6	7–11	—	3–9	6–6	8–10	7–5	7–11	1–11	8–9	7–11
Cleveland	11–7	9–9	5–7	9–3	—	6–12	6–6	11–6	9–3	4–12	4–8	7–5
Detroit	6–12	4–14	6–6	6–6	12–6	—	4–8	12–6	4–8	9–8	6–6	5–7
Kansas City	6–6	9–3	10–8	10–8	6–6	8–4	—	8–4	10–8	7–5	9–9	7–11
Milwaukee	7–11	6–12	8–4	5–7	6–11	6–12	4–8	—	4–8	5–13	5–7	10–2
Minnesota	8–4	5–7	10–8	11–7	3–9	8–4	8–10	8–4	—	2–10	11–7	11–7
New York	5–13	11–7	7–5	11–1	12–4	8–9	5–7	13–5	10–2	—	6–6	9–3
Oakland	8–4	8–4	12–6	9–8	8–4	6–6	9–9	7–5	7–11	6–6	—	7–11
Texas	4–8	9–3	6–12	11–7	5–7	7–5	11–7	2–10	7–11	3–9	11–7	—

=== Notable transactions ===
- May 10, 1976: Danny Darwin was signed as an amateur free agent by the Rangers.
- May 17, 1976: Bobby Jones was selected off waivers from the Rangers by the California Angels.
- May 28, 1976: Stan Perzanowski and cash were traded by the Rangers to the Cleveland Indians for Fritz Peterson.
- June 1, 1976: Bill Singer, Roy Smalley, Mike Cubbage, Jim Gideon, and $250,000 were traded by the Rangers to the Minnesota Twins for Bert Blyleven and Danny Thompson.
- June 8, 1976: 1976 Major League Baseball draft
  - Billy Sample was drafted by the Rangers in the 10th round.
  - Andre Robertson was drafted by the Rangers in the 12th round, but did not sign.

=== Roster ===
1976 Texas Rangers
Roster
Pitchers: 25 Mike Bacsik; 39 Len Barker; 35 Steve Barr; 28 Bert Blyleven; 38 Tommy Boggs; 34 Nelson Briles; 29 Steve Foucault; 26 Steve Hargan; 43 Joe Hoerner; 36 Gaylord Perry; 18 Stan Perzanowski; 19 Fritz Peterson; 48 Bill Singer; 33 Craig Skok; 46 Jeff Terpko; 40 Jim Umbarger	Catchers: 9 John Ellis; 14 Bill Fahey; 10 Jim Sundberg; Infielders: 22 Doug Ault; 4 Mike Cubbage; 17 Jim Fregosi; 21 Mike Hargrove; 11 Toby Harrah; 13 Roy Howell; 5 Ken Pape; 15 Greg Pryor; 7 Lenny Randle; 15 Roy Smalley; 4 Danny Thompson	Outfielders: 12 Juan Beníquez; 20 Jeff Burroughs; 16 Gene Clines; 6 Tom Grieve; 3 Joe Lahoud; 30 Dave Moates	Manager: 44 Frank Lucchesi; Coaches: 45 Pat Corrales; 47 Dick Gernert; 54 Sid Hudson; 42 Jackie Moore

== Player stats ==
=== Batting ===
==== Starters by position ====
Note: Pos = Position; G = Games played; AB = At bats; H = Hits; Avg. = Batting average; HR = Home runs; RBI = Runs batted in

Pos	Player	G	AB	H	Avg.	HR	RBI
C	Jim Sundberg	140	448	102	.228	3	34
1B	Mike Hargrove	151	541	155	.287	7	58
2B	Lenny Randle	142	539	121	.224	1	51
3B	Roy Howell	140	491	124	.253	8	53
SS	Toby Harrah	155	584	152	.260	15	67
LF	Gene Clines	116	446	123	.276	0	38
CF	Juan Beníquez	145	478	122	.255	0	33
RF	Jeff Burroughs	158	604	143	.237	18	86
DH	Tom Grieve	149	546	139	.255	20	81

==== Other batters ====
Note: G = Games played; AB = At bats; H = Hits; Avg. = Batting average; HR = Home runs; RBI = Runs batted in

Player	G	AB	H	Avg.	HR	RBI
Danny Thompson	64	196	42	.214	1	13
Dave Moates	85	137	33	.241	0	13
Jim Fregosi	58	133	31	.233	2	12
Roy Smalley	41	129	29	.225	1	8
Joe Lahoud	38	89	20	.225	1	5
Bill Fahey	38	80	20	.250	1	9
Mike Cubbage	14	32	7	.219	0	0
John Ellis	11	31	13	.419	1	8
Ken Pape	21	23	5	.217	1	4
Doug Ault	9	20	6	.300	0	0
Greg Pryor	5	8	3	.375	0	1

=== Pitching ===
==== Starting pitchers ====
Note: G = Games pitched; IP = Innings pitched; W = Wins; L = Losses; ERA = Earned run average; SO = Strikeouts

Player	G	IP	W	L	ERA	SO
Gaylord Perry	32	250.1	15	14	3.24	143
Nelson Briles	32	210.0	11	9	3.26	98
Bert Blyleven	24	202.1	9	11	2.76	144
Jim Umbarger	30	197.1	10	12	3.15	105
Tommy Boggs	13	90.1	1	7	3.49	36
Bill Singer	10	64.2	4	1	3.48	34
Len Barker	2	15.0	1	0	2.40	7

==== Other pitchers ====
Note: G = Games pitched; IP = Innings pitched; W = Wins; L = Losses; ERA = Earned run average; SO = Strikeouts

Player	G	IP	W	L	ERA	SO
Steve Hargan	35	124.1	8	8	3.62	63
Steve Barr	20	67.2	2	6	5.59	27
Fritz Peterson	4	15.0	1	0	3.60	4

==== Relief pitchers ====
Note: G = Games pitched; W = Wins; L = Losses; SV = Saves; ERA = Earned run average; SO = Strikeouts

Player	G	W	L	SV	ERA	SO
Joe Hoerner	41	0	4	8	5.14	15
Steve Foucault	46	8	8	5	3.33	41
Jeff Terpko	32	3	3	0	2.39	24
Mike Bacsik	23	3	2	0	4.25	21
Craig Skok	9	0	1	0	12.60	5
Stan Perzanowski	5	0	0	0	10.03	6

== Awards and honors ==
- Jim Sundberg, C, Gold Glove, 1976

All-Star Game

== Farm system ==
Level	Team	League	Manager
AAA	Sacramento Solons	Pacific Coast League	Rich Donnelly
AA	San Antonio Brewers	Texas League	Marty Martínez
A	Asheville Tourists	Western Carolinas League	Wayne Terwilliger
Rookie	GCL Rangers	Gulf Coast League	Joe Klein

LEAGUE CHAMPIONS: GCL Rangers
