= 1976 California Angels season =

Major League Baseball season

1976 California Angels
- League: American League
- Division: West
- Ballpark: Anaheim Stadium
- City: Anaheim, California
- Record: 76–86 (.469)
- Divisional place: 5th
- Owner: Gene Autry
- General manager: Harry Dalton
- Managers: Dick Williams, Norm Sherry
- Television: KTLA
- Radio: KMPC (Dick Enberg, Dave Niehaus, Don Drysdale)
- Stats: ESPN.com; Baseball Reference

The 1976 California Angels season was the 16th season of the Angels franchise in the American League, the 11th in Anaheim, and their 11th season playing their home games at Anaheim Stadium. The Angels finished the season fourth in the American League West with a record of 76 wins and 86 losses.

After a concert by The Who in March, groundskeepers reported that more than 100 marijuana plants sprouted on the playing field of Anaheim Stadium.

== Offseason ==
- January 7, 1976: Ernie Camacho was drafted by the Angels in the 4th round of the secondary phase of the January 1976 Major League Baseball draft, but did not sign.
- March 3, 1976: John Balaz, Dick Sharon, and Dave Machemer were traded by the Angels to the Boston Red Sox for Dick Drago.

== Regular season ==
- July 20, 1976: Hank Aaron of the Milwaukee Brewers hit the 755th and final home run of his career off Angels pitcher Dick Drago.
- August 31, 1976: Angels pitcher Nolan Ryan struck out Ron LeFlore of the Detroit Tigers for the 2000th strikeout of his career.
- September 10, 1976: Nolan Ryan had 18 strikeouts in one game.

=== Season standings ===
AL West
| Team | W | L | Pct. | GB | Home | Road |
|---|---|---|---|---|---|---|
| Kansas City Royals | 90 | 72 | .556 | — | 49‍–‍32 | 41‍–‍40 |
| Oakland Athletics | 87 | 74 | .540 | 2½ | 51‍–‍30 | 36‍–‍44 |
| Minnesota Twins | 85 | 77 | .525 | 5 | 44‍–‍37 | 41‍–‍40 |
| Texas Rangers | 76 | 86 | .469 | 14 | 39‍–‍42 | 37‍–‍44 |
| California Angels | 76 | 86 | .469 | 14 | 38‍–‍43 | 38‍–‍43 |
| Chicago White Sox | 64 | 97 | .398 | 25½ | 35‍–‍45 | 29‍–‍52 |

=== Record vs. opponents ===
1976 American League record Sources:
| Team | BAL | BOS | CAL | CWS | CLE | DET | KC | MIL | MIN | NYY | OAK | TEX |
|---|---|---|---|---|---|---|---|---|---|---|---|---|
| Baltimore | — | 7–11 | 8–4 | 8–4 | 7–11 | 12–6 | 6–6 | 11–7 | 4–8 | 13–5 | 4–8 | 8–4 |
| Boston | 11–7 | — | 7–5 | 6–6 | 9–9 | 14–4 | 3–9 | 12–6 | 7–5 | 7–11 | 4–8 | 3–9 |
| California | 4–8 | 5–7 | — | 11–7 | 7–5 | 6–6 | 8–10 | 4–8 | 8–10 | 5–7 | 6–12 | 12–6 |
| Chicago | 4–8 | 6–6 | 7–11 | — | 3–9 | 6–6 | 8–10 | 7–5 | 7–11 | 1–11 | 8–9 | 7–11 |
| Cleveland | 11–7 | 9–9 | 5–7 | 9–3 | — | 6–12 | 6–6 | 11–6 | 9–3 | 4–12 | 4–8 | 7–5 |
| Detroit | 6–12 | 4–14 | 6–6 | 6–6 | 12–6 | — | 4–8 | 12–6 | 4–8 | 9–8 | 6–6 | 5–7 |
| Kansas City | 6–6 | 9–3 | 10–8 | 10–8 | 6–6 | 8–4 | — | 8–4 | 10–8 | 7–5 | 9–9 | 7–11 |
| Milwaukee | 7–11 | 6–12 | 8–4 | 5–7 | 6–11 | 6–12 | 4–8 | — | 4–8 | 5–13 | 5–7 | 10–2 |
| Minnesota | 8–4 | 5–7 | 10–8 | 11–7 | 3–9 | 8–4 | 8–10 | 8–4 | — | 2–10 | 11–7 | 11–7 |
| New York | 5–13 | 11–7 | 7–5 | 11–1 | 12–4 | 8–9 | 5–7 | 13–5 | 10–2 | — | 6–6 | 9–3 |
| Oakland | 8–4 | 8–4 | 12–6 | 9–8 | 8–4 | 6–6 | 9–9 | 7–5 | 7–11 | 6–6 | — | 7–11 |
| Texas | 4–8 | 9–3 | 6–12 | 11–7 | 5–7 | 7–5 | 11–7 | 2–10 | 7–11 | 3–9 | 11–7 | — |

=== Notable transactions ===
- May 17, 1976: Bobby Jones was selected off waivers by the Angels from the Texas Rangers.
- June 6, 1976: Ed Herrmann was traded by the Angels to the Houston Astros for Terry Humphrey and Mike Barlow.

==== Draft picks ====
- June 8, 1976: 1976 Major League Baseball draft
  - Ken Landreaux was drafted by the Angels in the 1st round (6th pick).
  - Danny Boone was drafted by the Angels in the 2nd round of the secondary phase, but did not sign.

=== Roster ===
1976 California Angels
Roster
| Pitchers: 21 Jim Brewer; 41 Dick Drago; 39 Steve Dunning; 45 Paul Hartzell; 42 Andy Hassler; 33 Don Kirkwood; 43 Sid Monge; 44 Mike Overy; 47 Gary Ross; 30 Nolan Ryan; 19 Mickey Scott; 40 Frank Tanana; 48 John Verhoeven; 52 Gary Wheelock | Catchers: 8 Andy Etchebarren; 10 Adrian Garrett; 15 Ike Hampton; 12 Ed Herrmann; 9 Terry Humphrey; Infielders: 4 Dan Briggs; 7 Dave Chalk; 12 Tommy Davis; 11 Mario Guerrero; 16 Ron Jackson; 14 Bill Melton; 5 Mike Miley; 38 Tim Nordbrook; 1 Orlando Ramírez; 2 Jerry Remy; 11 Billy Smith; 27 Tony Solaita | Outfielders: 17 Orlando Alvarez; 22 Bruce Bochte; 25 Bobby Bonds; 28 Dave Collins; 29 Paul Dade; 9,14 Bobby Jones; 4 Joe Lahoud; 15,32 Carlos López; 36 Leroy Stanton; 3 Rusty Torres; Other batters: 10 Mike Easler | Manager: 37 Norm Sherry; 23 Dick Williams; Coaches: 49 Bob Clear; 24 Vern Hoscheit; 26 Billy Muffett; 50 Jimmie Reese; 27 Grover Resinger; 37 Norm Sherry |

== Player stats ==
=== Batting ===
==== Starters by position ====
Note: Pos = Position; G = Games played; AB = At bats; H = Hits; Avg. = Batting average; HR = Home runs; RBI = Runs batted in

| Pos | Player | G | AB | H | Avg. | HR | RBI |
|---|---|---|---|---|---|---|---|
| C | Andy Etchebarren | 103 | 247 | 56 | .227 | 0 | 21 |
| 1B | Tony Solaita | 63 | 215 | 58 | .270 | 9 | 33 |
| 2B | Jerry Remy | 143 | 502 | 132 | .263 | 0 | 28 |
| 3B | Ron Jackson | 127 | 410 | 93 | .227 | 8 | 40 |
| SS | Dave Chalk | 142 | 438 | 95 | .217 | 0 | 33 |
| LF | Bruce Bochte | 146 | 466 | 120 | .248 | 2 | 49 |
| CF | Rusty Torres | 120 | 264 | 54 | .205 | 6 | 27 |
| RF | Bobby Bonds | 99 | 378 | 100 | .265 | 10 | 54 |
| DH | Tommy Davis | 72 | 219 | 58 | .265 | 3 | 26 |

==== Other batters ====
Note: G = Games played; AB = At bats; H = Hits; Avg. = Batting average; HR = Home runs; RBI = Runs batted in

| Player | G | AB | H | Avg. | HR | RBI |
|---|---|---|---|---|---|---|
| Dave Collins | 99 | 365 | 96 | .263 | 4 | 28 |
| Bill Melton | 118 | 341 | 71 | .208 | 6 | 42 |
| Mario Guerrero | 83 | 268 | 76 | .284 | 1 | 18 |
| Dan Briggs | 77 | 248 | 53 | .214 | 1 | 14 |
| Leroy Stanton | 93 | 231 | 44 | .190 | 2 | 25 |
| Terry Humphrey | 71 | 196 | 48 | .245 | 1 | 19 |
| Bobby Jones | 78 | 166 | 35 | .211 | 6 | 17 |
| Joe Lahoud | 42 | 96 | 17 | .177 | 0 | 4 |
| Orlando Ramírez | 30 | 70 | 14 | .200 | 0 | 5 |
| Mike Easler | 21 | 54 | 13 | .241 | 0 | 4 |
| Adrian Garrett | 29 | 48 | 6 | .125 | 0 | 3 |
| Ed Herrmann | 29 | 46 | 8 | .174 | 2 | 8 |
| Orlando Álvarez | 15 | 42 | 7 | .167 | 2 | 8 |
| Mike Miley | 14 | 38 | 7 | .184 | 0 | 4 |
| Carlos López | 9 | 10 | 0 | .000 | 0 | 0 |
| Paul Dade | 13 | 9 | 1 | .111 | 0 | 1 |
| Tim Nordbrook | 5 | 8 | 0 | .000 | 0 | 0 |
| Billy Smith | 13 | 8 | 3 | .375 | 0 | 0 |
| Ike Hampton | 3 | 2 | 0 | .000 | 0 | 0 |

=== Pitching ===
==== Starting pitchers ====
Note: G = Games pitched; IP = Innings pitched; W = Wins; L = Losses; ERA = Earned run average; SO = Strikeouts

| Player | G | IP | W | L | ERA | SO |
|---|---|---|---|---|---|---|
| Frank Tanana | 34 | 288.1 | 19 | 10 | 2.43 | 261 |
| Nolan Ryan | 39 | 284.1 | 17 | 18 | 3.36 | 327 |
| Gary Ross | 34 | 225.0 | 8 | 16 | 3.00 | 100 |
| Don Kirkwood | 28 | 157.2 | 6 | 12 | 4.62 | 78 |

==== Other pitchers ====
Note: G = Games pitched; IP = Innings pitched; W = Wins; L = Losses; ERA = Earned run average; SO = Strikeouts

| Player | G | IP | W | L | ERA | SO |
|---|---|---|---|---|---|---|
| Paul Hartzell | 37 | 166.0 | 7 | 4 | 2.77 | 51 |
| Sid Monge | 32 | 117.2 | 6 | 7 | 3.37 | 53 |
| Andy Hassler | 14 | 47.1 | 0 | 6 | 5.13 | 16 |

==== Relief pitchers ====
Note: G = Games pitched; W = Wins; L = Losses; SV = Saves; ERA = Earned run average; SO = Strikeouts

| Player | G | W | L | SV | ERA | SO |
|---|---|---|---|---|---|---|
| Dick Drago | 43 | 7 | 8 | 6 | 4.42 | 43 |
| Mickey Scott | 33 | 3 | 0 | 3 | 3.23 | 10 |
| John Verhoeven | 21 | 0 | 2 | 4 | 3.38 | 23 |
| Jim Brewer | 13 | 3 | 1 | 2 | 3.70 | 16 |
| Mike Overy | 5 | 0 | 2 | 0 | 6.14 | 8 |
| Steve Dunning | 4 | 0 | 0 | 0 | 7.50 | 4 |
| Gary Wheelock | 2 | 0 | 0 | 0 | 27.00 | 2 |

== Farm system ==
| Level | Team | League | Manager |
|---|---|---|---|
| AAA | Salt Lake City Gulls | Pacific Coast League | Jimy Williams |
| AA | El Paso Diablos | Texas League | Bobby Knoop |
| A | Salinas Packers | California League | Del Crandall |
| A | Quad Cities Angels | Midwest League | Moose Stubing |
| Rookie | Idaho Falls Angels | Pioneer League | Larry Himes |

Records
| Preceded by 1975 | California Angels seasons 1976 | Succeeded by 1977 |
