= 1976 Baltimore Orioles season =

Major League Baseball season

1976 Baltimore Orioles
- League: American League
- Division: East
- Ballpark: Memorial Stadium
- City: Baltimore, Maryland
- Record: 88–74 (.543)
- Divisional place: 2nd
- Owners: Jerold Hoffberger
- General managers: Hank Peters
- Managers: Earl Weaver
- Television: WJZ-TV
- Radio: WBAL (AM) (Chuck Thompson, Bill O'Donnell)

The 1976 Baltimore Orioles season was the 78th season in Baltimore Orioles franchise history, the 23rd in Baltimore, and the 23rd at Memorial Stadium. The Orioles finished second in the American League East with a record of 88 wins and 74 losses. The Orioles stayed in contention for the division title until a 1–0 loss to the Boston Red Sox at Memorial Stadium on September 25.

The Orioles sustained a net operating loss of $102,531. Reggie Jackson, Bobby Grich and Wayne Garland left the team following the campaign in what was the advent of Major League Baseball (MLB) free agency.

== Offseason ==
- January 7, 1976: Wayne Krenchicki was selected by the Orioles in the first round (7th pick) of the 1976 Major League Baseball draft Secondary Phase.
- April 2, 1976: Don Baylor, Mike Torrez, and Paul Mitchell were traded to the Oakland Athletics for Reggie Jackson, Ken Holtzman, and Bill VanBommell (minors).

== Regular season ==
This was the first season since 1957 that an Oriole other than Brooks Robinson got the most starts at third base, with Doug DeCinces taking over the position for the 39-year-old future Hall of Famer.

Following the early April trade, Reggie Jackson did not immediately report; his first plate appearance was on May 2.

=== Season standings ===
AL East
Team	W	L	Pct.	GB	Home	Road
New York Yankees	97	62	.610	—	45‍–‍35	52‍–‍27
Baltimore Orioles	88	74	.543	10½	42‍–‍39	46‍–‍35
Boston Red Sox	83	79	.512	15½	46‍–‍35	37‍–‍44
Cleveland Indians	81	78	.509	16	44‍–‍35	37‍–‍43
Detroit Tigers	74	87	.460	24	36‍–‍44	38‍–‍43
Milwaukee Brewers	66	95	.410	32	36‍–‍45	30‍–‍50

=== Record vs. opponents ===
1976 American League record Sources:
Team	BAL	BOS	CAL	CWS	CLE	DET	KC	MIL	MIN	NYY	OAK	TEX
Baltimore	—	7–11	8–4	8–4	7–11	12–6	6–6	11–7	4–8	13–5	4–8	8–4
Boston	11–7	—	7–5	6–6	9–9	14–4	3–9	12–6	7–5	7–11	4–8	3–9
California	4–8	5–7	—	11–7	7–5	6–6	8–10	4–8	8–10	5–7	6–12	12–6
Chicago	4–8	6–6	7–11	—	3–9	6–6	8–10	7–5	7–11	1–11	8–9	7–11
Cleveland	11–7	9–9	5–7	9–3	—	6–12	6–6	11–6	9–3	4–12	4–8	7–5
Detroit	6–12	4–14	6–6	6–6	12–6	—	4–8	12–6	4–8	9–8	6–6	5–7
Kansas City	6–6	9–3	10–8	10–8	6–6	8–4	—	8–4	10–8	7–5	9–9	7–11
Milwaukee	7–11	6–12	8–4	5–7	6–11	6–12	4–8	—	4–8	5–13	5–7	10–2
Minnesota	8–4	5–7	10–8	11–7	3–9	8–4	8–10	8–4	—	2–10	11–7	11–7
New York	5–13	11–7	7–5	11–1	12–4	8–9	5–7	13–5	10–2	—	6–6	9–3
Oakland	8–4	8–4	12–6	9–8	8–4	6–6	9–9	7–5	7–11	6–6	—	7–11
Texas	4–8	9–3	6–12	11–7	5–7	7–5	11–7	2–10	7–11	3–9	11–7	—

=== Notable transactions ===
- April 8, 1976: Bobby Brown was released by the Orioles.
- June 8, 1976: Dallas Williams was selected in the first round (20th pick) of the 1976 Major League Baseball draft.
- June 15, 1976: Doyle Alexander, Jimmy Freeman, Elrod Hendricks, Ken Holtzman, and Grant Jackson were traded to the New York Yankees for Rudy May, Tippy Martinez, Dave Pagan, Scott McGregor, and Rick Dempsey.
- October 1, 1976: Dave Johnson was purchased by the expansion Seattle Mariners.

=== Roster ===
1976 Baltimore Orioles
Roster
Pitchers: 13 Doyle Alexander; 35 Mike Cuellar; 46 Mike Flanagan; 17 Wayne Garland; 39,48 Ross Grimsley; 38 Fred Holdsworth; 30 Ken Holtzman; 23 Grant Jackson; 61 Dennis Martínez; 23,36 Tippy Martinez; 43 Rudy May; 39 Scott McGregor; 37 Dyar Miller; 30 Dave Pagan; 22 Jim Palmer	Catchers: 24 Rick Dempsey; 25 Dave Duncan; 10 Elrod Hendricks; Infielders: 21 Bob Bailor; 7 Mark Belanger; 10,38 Terry Crowley; 44 Rich Dauer; 11 Doug DeCinces; 40 Kiko Garcia; 3 Bobby Grich; 12 Tommy Harper; 14 Lee May; 16 Tony Muser; 8 Tim Nordbrook; 5 Brooks Robinson; 15 Royle Stillman	Outfielders: 6 Paul Blair; 1 Al Bumbry; 9 Reggie Jackson; 27,52 Andrés Mora; 28 Tom Shopay; 29 Ken Singleton	Manager: 4 Earl Weaver; Coaches: 31 George Bamberger; 41 Jim Frey; 55 Billy Hunter; 47 Cal Ripken

== Player stats ==
=== Batting ===
==== Starters by position ====
Note: Pos = Position; G = Games played; AB = At bats; H = Hits; Avg. = Batting average; HR = Home runs; RBI = Runs batted in

Pos	Player	G	AB	H	Avg.	HR	RBI
C	Dave Duncan	93	284	58	.204	4	17
1B	Lee May	148	530	137	.258	25	109
2B	Bobby Grich	144	518	138	.266	13	54
3B	Doug DeCinces	129	440	103	.234	11	42
SS	Mark Belanger	153	522	141	.270	1	40
LF	Ken Singleton	154	544	151	.278	13	70
CF	Paul Blair	145	375	74	.197	3	16
RF	Reggie Jackson	134	498	138	.277	27	91
DH	Andrés Mora	73	220	48	.218	6	25

==== Other batters ====
Note: G = Games played; AB = At bats; H = Hits; Avg. = Batting average; HR = Home runs; RBI = Runs batted in

Player	G	AB	H	Avg.	HR	RBI
Al Bumbry	133	450	113	.251	9	36
Tony Muser	136	326	74	.227	1	30
Brooks Robinson	71	218	46	.211	3	11
Rick Dempsey	59	174	37	.213	0	10
Elrod Hendricks	28	79	11	.139	1	4
Tommy Harper	46	77	18	.234	1	7
Terry Crowley	33	61	15	.246	0	5
Rich Dauer	11	39	4	.103	0	3
Kiko Garcia	11	32	7	.219	1	4
Tim Nordbrook	27	22	5	.227	0	0
Royle Stillman	20	22	2	.091	0	1
Tom Shopay	14	20	4	.200	0	1
Bob Bailor	9	6	2	.333	0	0

=== Pitching ===
==== Starting pitchers ====
Note: G = Games pitched; IP = Innings pitched; W = Wins; L = Losses; ERA = Earned run average; SO = Strikeouts

Player	G	IP	W	L	ERA	SO
Jim Palmer	40	315.0	22	13	2.51	159
Rudy May	24	152.1	11	7	3.78	71
Ross Grimsley	28	136.2	8	7	3.95	41
Mike Cuellar	26	107.0	4	13	4.96	32
Ken Holtzman	13	97.2	5	4	2.86	35

==== Other pitchers ====
Note: G = Games pitched; IP = Innings pitched; W = Wins; L = Losses; ERA = Earned run average; SO = Strikeouts

Player	G	IP	W	L	ERA	SO
Wayne Garland	38	232.1	20	7	2.67	113
Mike Flanagan	20	85.0	3	5	4.13	56
Doyle Alexander	11	64.1	3	4	3.50	17
Dave Pagan	20	46.2	1	4	5.98	34
Dennis Martínez	4	27.2	1	2	2.60	18
Scott McGregor	3	14.2	0	1	3.68	6

==== Relief pitchers ====
Note: G = Games pitched; W = Wins; L = Losses; SV = Saves; ERA = Earned run average; SO = Strikeouts

Player	G	W	L	SV	ERA	SO
Tippy Martinez	28	3	1	8	2.59	31
Dyar Miller	49	2	4	7	2.94	37
Fred Holdsworth	16	4	1	2	2.04	24
Grant Jackson	13	1	1	3	5.12	14

== Farm system ==
Level	Team	League	Manager
AAA	Rochester Red Wings	International League	Joe Altobelli
AA	Charlotte O's	Southern League	Jimmie Schaffer
A	Miami Orioles	Florida State League	Len Johnston
Rookie	Bluefield Orioles	Appalachian League	Ben Hines
