= 1976 Boston Red Sox season =

Major League Baseball season

1976 Boston Red Sox
- League: American League
- Division: East
- Ballpark: Fenway Park
- City: Boston, Massachusetts
- Record: 83–79 (.512)
- Divisional place: 3rd
- Owners: Tom Yawkey, Jean Yawkey (Note: Tom Yawkey died in July; ownership and oversight of the club passed to his wife, Jean.)
- President: Tom Yawkey, Jean Yawkey
- General manager: Dick O'Connell
- Managers: Darrell Johnson (41–45); Don Zimmer (42–34)
- Television: WSBK-TV, Ch. 38 (Dick Stockton, Ken Harrelson)
- Radio: WMEX-AM 1510 (Ned Martin, Jim Woods)
- Stats: ESPN.com; Baseball Reference

The 1976 Boston Red Sox season was the 76th season in the franchise's Major League Baseball history. The Red Sox finished third in the American League East with a record of 83 wins and 79 losses, 15 1/2 games behind the New York Yankees, who went on to win the AL championship.

== Offseason ==
- November 17, 1975: Juan Beniquez and Steve Barr were traded by the Red Sox to the Texas Rangers for pitcher Ferguson Jenkins.
- December 12, 1975: Roger Moret was traded by the Red Sox to the Atlanta Braves for Tom House.
- February 15, 1976: Gene Michael was signed as a free agent by the Red Sox.
- March 3, 1976: Dick Drago was traded by the Red Sox to the California Angels for John Balaz, Dick Sharon, and Dave Machemer.

== Regular season ==
Record by month
Month	Record		Cumulative		AL East		Ref.
Month	Won	Lost	Won	Lost	Position	GB	Ref.
April	6	7	6	7	5th	4	
May	13	15	19	22	4th	7	
June	15	13	34	35	3rd (tie)	9	
July	12	19	46	54	5th	15 1/2	
August	16	14	62	68	4th	18	
September	18	11	80	79	4th	16	
October	3	0	83	79	3rd	15 1/2	

=== Highlights ===
The Red Sox did not come close to repeating the previous year's success. An off-season contract dispute with Fred Lynn was a distraction. In early May, a brawl with the New York Yankees led to a shoulder injury for Bill Lee, one of their best pitchers and a 17-game winner in 1975; Lee would be out until mid-1977, and his loss was keenly felt.

On June 15, Oakland Athletics owner Charlie Finley attempted to sell left fielder Joe Rudi and relief pitcher Rollie Fingers to the Red Sox for $1 million each, and starting pitcher Vida Blue to the New York Yankees for $1.5 million. Three days later, Commissioner of Baseball Bowie Kuhn voided the transactions, citing "the best interests of baseball."

The Red Sox owner, Tom Yawkey, died of leukemia in July. Manager Darrell Johnson was fired shortly thereafter and replaced by coach Don Zimmer. The team finished the season with an 83–79 record.

=== Season standings ===
AL East
Team	W	L	Pct.	GB	Home	Road
New York Yankees	97	62	.610	—	45‍–‍35	52‍–‍27
Baltimore Orioles	88	74	.543	10½	42‍–‍39	46‍–‍35
Boston Red Sox	83	79	.512	15½	46‍–‍35	37‍–‍44
Cleveland Indians	81	78	.509	16	44‍–‍35	37‍–‍43
Detroit Tigers	74	87	.460	24	36‍–‍44	38‍–‍43
Milwaukee Brewers	66	95	.410	32	36‍–‍45	30‍–‍50

=== Record vs. opponents ===
1976 American League record Sources:
Team	BAL	BOS	CAL	CWS	CLE	DET	KC	MIL	MIN	NYY	OAK	TEX
Baltimore	—	7–11	8–4	8–4	7–11	12–6	6–6	11–7	4–8	13–5	4–8	8–4
Boston	11–7	—	7–5	6–6	9–9	14–4	3–9	12–6	7–5	7–11	4–8	3–9
California	4–8	5–7	—	11–7	7–5	6–6	8–10	4–8	8–10	5–7	6–12	12–6
Chicago	4–8	6–6	7–11	—	3–9	6–6	8–10	7–5	7–11	1–11	8–9	7–11
Cleveland	11–7	9–9	5–7	9–3	—	6–12	6–6	11–6	9–3	4–12	4–8	7–5
Detroit	6–12	4–14	6–6	6–6	12–6	—	4–8	12–6	4–8	9–8	6–6	5–7
Kansas City	6–6	9–3	10–8	10–8	6–6	8–4	—	8–4	10–8	7–5	9–9	7–11
Milwaukee	7–11	6–12	8–4	5–7	6–11	6–12	4–8	—	4–8	5–13	5–7	10–2
Minnesota	8–4	5–7	10–8	11–7	3–9	8–4	8–10	8–4	—	2–10	11–7	11–7
New York	5–13	11–7	7–5	11–1	12–4	8–9	5–7	13–5	10–2	—	6–6	9–3
Oakland	8–4	8–4	12–6	9–8	8–4	6–6	9–9	7–5	7–11	6–6	—	7–11
Texas	4–8	9–3	6–12	11–7	5–7	7–5	11–7	2–10	7–11	3–9	11–7	—

=== Notable transactions ===
- April 7, 1976: Diego Seguí was released by the Red Sox.
- May 4, 1976: Gene Michael was released by the Red Sox.
- June 3, 1976: Bernie Carbo was traded by the Red Sox to the Milwaukee Brewers for Bobby Darwin and Tom Murphy.
- June 8, 1976: Wade Boggs was drafted by the Red Sox in the 7th round of the 1976 Major League Baseball draft. Player signed June 10, 1976.

=== Opening Day lineup ===
17	Cecil Cooper	DH
5	Denny Doyle	2B
19	Fred Lynn	CF
14	Jim Rice	LF
8	Carl Yastrzemski	1B
27	Carlton Fisk	C
24	Dwight Evans	RF
6	Rico Petrocelli	3B
7	Rick Burleson	SS
31	Ferguson Jenkins	P

=== Roster ===
1976 Boston Red Sox
Roster
Pitchers: 26 Reggie Cleveland; 29 Tom House; 31 Ferguson Jenkins; 46 Rick Jones; 21 Rick Kreuger; 37 Bill Lee; 47 Tom Murphy; 45 Dick Pole; 23 Luis Tiant; 38 Jim Willoughby; 40 Rick Wise	Catchers: 27 Carlton Fisk; 50 Andy Merchant; 10 Bob Montgomery; 22 Ernie Whitt; Infielders: 41 Jack Baker; 7 Rick Burleson; 15,17 Cecil Cooper; 3 Steve Dillard; 5 Denny Doyle; 2 Doug Griffin; 12 Bob Heise; 4 Butch Hobson; 30 Deron Johnson; 6 Rico Petrocelli; 8 Carl Yastrzemski	Outfielders: 1 Bernie Carbo; 42 Bobby Darwin; 24 Dwight Evans; 19 Fred Lynn; 16 Rick Miller; 14 Jim Rice	Managers: 22 Darrell Johnson; 34 Don Zimmer; Coaches: 33 Don Bryant (Bullpen); 35 Johnny Pesky (First base); 36 Eddie Popowski (Bench/third base); 32 Stan Williams (Pitching); 34 Don Zimmer (Third base)

== Player stats ==
=== Batting ===
Note: G = Games played; AB = At bats; R = Runs; H = Hits; 2B = Doubles; 3B = Triples; HR = Home runs; RBI = Runs batted in; SB = Stolen bases; BB = Walks; AVG = Batting average; SLG = Slugging average

Player	G	AB	R	H	2B	3B	HR	RBI	SB	BB	AVG	SLG
Jim Rice	153	581	75	164	25	8	25	85	8	28	.282	.482
Carl Yastrzemski	155	546	71	146	23	2	21	102	5	80	.267	.432
Rick Burleson	152	540	75	157	27	1	7	42	14	60	.291	.383
Fred Lynn	132	507	76	159	32	8	10	65	14	48	.314	.467
Dwight Evans	146	501	61	121	34	5	17	62	6	57	.242	.431
Carlton Fisk	134	487	76	124	17	5	17	58	12	56	.255	.415
Cecil Cooper	123	451	66	127	22	6	15	78	7	16	.282	.457
Denny Doyle	117	432	51	108	15	5	0	26	8	22	.250	.308
Rick Miller	105	269	40	76	15	3	0	27	11	34	.283	.361
Butch Hobson	76	269	34	63	7	5	8	34	0	15	.234	.387
Rico Petrocelli	85	240	17	51	7	1	3	24	0	34	.213	.288
Steve Dillard	57	167	22	46	14	0	1	15	6	17	.275	.377
Doug Griffin	49	127	14	24	2	0	0	4	2	9	.189	.205
Bobby Darwin	43	106	9	19	5	2	3	13	1	2	.179	.349
Bob Montgomery	31	93	10	23	3	1	3	13	0	5	.247	.398
Bob Heise	32	56	5	15	2	0	0	5	0	1	.268	.304
Bernie Carbo	17	55	5	13	4	0	2	6	1	8	.236	.418
Deron Johnson	15	38	3	5	1	1	0	0	0	5	.132	.211
Jack Baker	12	23	1	3	0	0	1	2	0	1	.130	.261
Ernie Whitt	8	18	4	4	2	0	1	3	0	2	.222	.500
Andy Merchant	2	2	0	0	0	0	0	0	0	0	.000	.000
Pitcher totals	162	3	1	0	0	0	0	0	0	0	.000	.000
Team totals	162	5511	716	1448	257	53	134	664	95	500	.263	.402

=== Pitching ===
Note: W = Wins; L = Losses; ERA = Earned run average; G = Games pitched; GS = Games started; SV = Saves; IP = Innings pitched; H = Hits allowed; R = Runs allowed; ER = Earned runs allowed; BB = Walks allowed; SO = Strikeouts

Player	W	L	ERA	G	GS	SV	IP	H	R	ER	BB	SO
Luis Tiant	21	12	3.06	38	38	0	279.0	274	107	95	64	131
Rick Wise	14	11	3.53	34	34	0	224.1	218	100	88	48	93
Fergie Jenkins	12	11	3.27	30	29	0	209.0	201	85	76	43	142
Reggie Cleveland	10	9	3.07	41	14	2	170.0	159	73	58	61	76
Dick Pole	6	5	4.33	31	15	0	120.2	131	62	58	48	49
Rick Jones	5	3	3.36	24	14	0	104.1	133	48	39	26	45
Jim Willoughby	3	12	2.82	54	0	10	99.0	94	38	31	31	37
Bill Lee	5	7	5.63	24	14	3	96.0	124	68	60	28	29
Tom Murphy	4	5	3.44	37	0	8	81.0	91	43	31	25	32
Tom House	1	3	4.33	36	0	4	43.2	39	22	21	19	27
Rick Kreuger	2	1	4.06	8	4	0	31.0	31	14	14	16	12
Team totals	83	79	3.52	162	162	27	1458.0	1495	660	571	409	673

== Statistical leaders ==
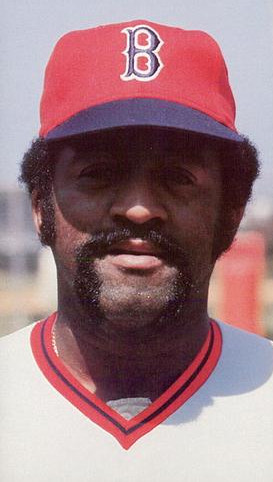
Luis Tiant

Category	Player	Statistic
Youngest player	Rick Jones	21
Oldest player	Deron Johnson	37
Wins Above Replacement	Luis Tiant	6.2

=== Batting ===
Abbr.	Category	Player	Statistic
G	Games played	Carl Yastrzemski	155
PA	Plate appearances	Carl Yastrzemski	636
AB	At bats	Jim Rice	581
R	Runs scored	Carlton Fisk	76
R	Runs scored	Fred Lynn	76
H	Hits	Jim Rice	164
2B	Doubles	Dwight Evans	34
3B	Triples	Fred Lynn	8
3B	Triples	Jim Rice	8
HR	Home runs	Jim Rice	25
RBI	Runs batted in	Carl Yastrzemski	102
SB	Stolen bases	Rick Burleson	14
SB	Stolen bases	Fred Lynn	14
CS	Caught stealing	Rick Miller	10
BB	Base on balls	Carl Yastrzemski	80
SO	Strikeouts	Jim Rice	123
BA	Batting average	Fred Lynn	.314
OBP	On-base percentage	Fred Lynn	.367
SLG	Slugging percentage	Jim Rice	.482
OPS	On-base plus slugging	Fred Lynn	.835
OPS+	Adjusted OPS	Fred Lynn	132
TB	Total bases	Jim Rice	280
GIDP	Grounded into double play	Jim Rice	18
HBP	Hit by pitch	Dwight Evans	6
HBP	Hit by pitch	Carlton Fisk	6
SH	Sacrifice hits	Cecil Cooper	9
SF	Sacrifice flies	Fred Lynn	10
IBB	Intentional base on balls	Cecil Cooper	6
IBB	Intentional base on balls	Carl Yastrzemski	6

=== Pitching ===
Abbr.	Category	Player	Statistic
W	Wins	Luis Tiant	21
L	Losses	Luis Tiant	12
L	Losses	Jim Willoughby	12
W-L %	Winning percentage	Luis Tiant	.636 (21–12)
ERA	Earned run average	Luis Tiant	3.06
G	Games pitched	Jim Willoughby	54
GS	Games started	Luis Tiant	38
GF	Games finished	Jim Willoughby	40
CG	Complete games	Luis Tiant	19
SHO	Shutouts	Rick Wise	4
SV	Saves	Jim Willoughby	10
IP	Innings pitched	Luis Tiant	279
SO	Strikeouts	Ferguson Jenkins	142
WHIP	Walks plus hits per inning pitched	Ferguson Jenkins	1.167

== Awards and honors ==
- Dwight Evans – Gold Glove Award (OF)
- Luis Tiant – AL Player of the Month (August)

All-Star Game

- Carlton Fisk, reserve C
- Fred Lynn, starting CF
- Luis Tiant, reserve P
- Carl Yastrzemski, reserve OF

== Farm system ==
Level	Team	League	Manager
AAA	Pawtucket Red Sox†	International League	Joe Morgan
AA	Bristol Red Sox	Eastern League	John Kennedy
A	Winston-Salem Red Sox	Carolina League	Tony Torchia
A	Winter Haven Red Sox	Florida State League	Rac Slider
A-Short Season	Elmira Red Sox	New York–Penn League	Dick Berardino

† The Pawtucket Red Sox were known as the Rhode Island Red Sox during the 1976 season.
LEAGUE CHAMPIONS: Winston-Salem, Elmira
