= Stan Perzanowski =

American baseball player (born 1950)

- Pitcher
- Born: August 25, 1950 (age 75); East Chicago, Indiana, U.S.
- Batted: Both Threw: Right

MLB debut
- June 20, 1971, for the Chicago White Sox

Last MLB appearance
- September 27, 1978, for the Minnesota Twins

MLB statistics
- Win–loss record: 5–11
- Earned run average: 5.11
- Strikeouts: 70
- Stats at Baseball Reference

Teams
- Chicago White Sox (1971, 1974); Texas Rangers (1975–1976); Minnesota Twins (1978)

Stanley Perzanowski (born August 25, 1950) is an American former Major League Baseball pitcher. He was drafted by the Chicago White Sox in the 16th round of the 1968 amateur draft. He threw right-handed during his baseball career.

== Major League Baseball career ==
Perzanowski made his major league debut for the White Sox at age 20. That year, he went on to record an era of 12.00 in 6.0 innings. After spending 1972 and 1973 in the minors, he re-emerged with the White Sox, recording a 19.29 ERA in 2.1 innings. Perzanowski was traded from the White Sox to the Texas Rangers for Steve Dunning on February 25, 1975. In 1975, he had his breakout year, recording a team-best 3.00 ERA in 66.0 innings. In 1976, Perzanowski recorded a 10.03 ERA in 11.2 innings. He was dealt along with cash from the Rangers to the Cleveland Indians for Fritz Peterson on May 29, 1976. On March 28, 1977, Perzanowski was traded to the California Angels to complete an earlier trade. On August 16, 1977, he was released for the first time in his career. He was later picked up by the Minnesota Twins. In 1978 he finally got back to the Majors, recording an ERA of 5.24 in 56.2 innings. On February 13, 1979, Perzanowski was released by the Twins organization. Perzanowski decided it was time to retire, ending his Major League career.

At the time of his retirement Perzanowski had a 5–11 record, a 5.11 ERA, 60 walks, and 70 strikeouts. He was 0 for 2 batting, with a lifetime batting average of .000. His lifetime fielding percentage was .935.
