= Craig Skok =

American baseball player (born 1947)

- Pitcher
- Born: September 1, 1947 (age 78); Dobbs Ferry, New York, U.S.
- Batted: Right Threw: Left

MLB debut
- May 4, 1973, for the Boston Red Sox

Last MLB appearance
- July 29, 1979, for the Atlanta Braves

MLB statistics
- Win–loss record: 4–7
- Earned run average: 4.86
- Strikeouts: 85
- Stats at Baseball Reference

Teams
- Boston Red Sox (1973); Texas Rangers (1976); Atlanta Braves (1978–1979)

Craig Richard Skok (born September 1, 1947) is an American former middle relief pitcher in Major League Baseball who played for the Boston Red Sox, Texas Rangers and Atlanta Braves in all or parts of four seasons spanning 1976–1979. Listed at 6' 0" ft [1.83 m], 190 lb [86 kg], Skok batted right-handed and threw left-handed. He was born in Dobbs Ferry, New York.

Skok attended Mohonasen High School then graduated from Fort Lauderdale High School in 1965. He then attended Broward College and earned a scholarship to Florida State University and joined the Red Sox' organization as an undrafted free agent in 1969. He was previously drafted by both Boston (January 1967) and the Minnesota Twins (June 1967), but did not sign.

Skok was selected to the All-Star team in both the Eastern League (1971) and the International League (1972) before his 1973 trial with the Red Sox. Afterwards, he spent the full seasons of 1974–1975 in the Minor Leagues.

Before the 1976 season, Skok was sent by Boston along with Juan Beníquez and Steve Barr to Texas in the same transaction that brought Ferguson Jenkins to the Red Sox. He then split the season between the Rangers and their Triple-A Sacramento Solons affiliate, and was released and out of baseball for 1977.

Skok signed with the Braves as a free agent in 1978 and appeared in 87 games over the 1978–1979 campaigns.

In a four-season career, Skok posted a 4–7 record with a 4.86 earned run average and five saves in 107 pitching appearances — all in relief — giving up 93 runs (12 of them unearned) on 170 hits and 58 walks, while striking out 85 in 150 innings of work. He recorded all of his MLB victories and four of his five saves in a Braves' uniform.
