= Darrell Jackson (baseball) =

American baseball player (1956–2026)

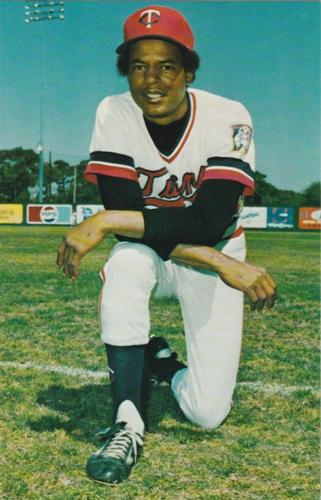
- Pitcher
- Born: April 3, 1956; Los Angeles, California, U.S.
- Died: July 5, 2026 (aged 70); La Habra, California, U.S.
- Batted: Both Threw: Left

MLB debut
- June 16, 1978, for the Minnesota Twins

Last MLB appearance
- June 1, 1982, for the Minnesota Twins

MLB statistics
- Win–loss record: 20–27
- Earned run average: 4.38
- Strikeouts: 229
- Stats at Baseball Reference

Teams
- Minnesota Twins (1978–1982)

Darrell Preston Jackson (April 3, 1956 – July 5, 2026) was an American professional baseball pitcher. He pitched all or parts of five seasons in Major League Baseball (MLB) from 1978 until 1982, all with the Minnesota Twins.

== College career ==
Jackson attended Locke High School, where he was teammates with future Baseball Hall of Famers Eddie Murray and Ozzie Smith. He was drafted in the 6th round of the 1973 draft, but opted to play college baseball at Arizona State University, appearing in the College World Series in each of his last three seasons there. In 1977, he helped lead the Sun Devils to the national championship by throwing a three-hit shutout in the semifinals.

== Major League career ==
In 1977, he was again drafted by the Twins in the 9th round of the amateur draft. He made his professional debut in 1978 for the Orlando Twins of the Southern League, and in his very first start he threw nine innings of no-hit ball against the Jacksonville Suns. Unfortunately, the game was tied after nine innings, and Jackson was relieved by fellow future Twin Jeff Holly. Orlando won the game, 1–0, in 12 innings.

After just 10 starts in the minors, Jackson was called up by the Twins and got a win in his Major League debut on June 3 against the Detroit Tigers. In 19 games with Minnesota, Jackson went 4–6 with a 4.48 ERA. He recorded shutout in 1978, on July 7 against the Oakland Athletics.

He split 1979 between the Twins and their Triple-A farm club, the Toledo Mud Hens. In the Majors, he pitched in 24 games (including 8 starts), going 4–4 with a 4.28 ERA. The next season, 1980, was Jackson's first (and, as it turned out, only) full season in the Majors. He set career bests in wins (9), ERA (3.87), and strikeouts (90). On May 10 he pitched 10 shutout innings against the New York Yankees in Yankee Stadium, allowing just five hits and issuing just one walk in a 1-0 win. On June 21, Jackson recorded his one and only save at the MLB level. He retired the last batter of the game to preserve a 3-2 victory over the Indians.

Jackson spent most of 1981 on the sidelines with a shoulder injury, appearing in just 14 games in the majors and 2 at Triple-A. In 1982, the bottom fell out of Jackson's performance, as he went 0–5 and his ERA jumped to a career-worst 6.25. Things were no better in the minors, as he went 1–3 with an even worse ERA of 7.00 in 4 starts. On July 26, the Twins released Jackson, and he never again pitched in organized baseball.

== Personal ==
Following his playing career, Jackson batted mental health and substance abuse issues. He started receiving treatment in 1986 and then in 1992, Jackson started the 10-20 Club in Downey, California, working with at-risk youth battling depression and drug and alcohol issues.

Jackson died on July 5, 2026, at the age of 70, from lung cancer.
