= Mike Overy =

American baseball player (1951–2021)

- Relief pitcher
- Born: January 27, 1951; Clinton, Illinois, U.S.
- Died: September 22, 2021 (aged 70); Sun City West, Arizona, U.S.
- Batted: Right Threw: Right

MLB debut
- August 14, 1976, for the California Angels

Last MLB appearance
- September 9, 1976, for the California Angels

MLB statistics
- Win–loss record: 0–2
- Strikeouts: 8
- Earned run average: 6.14
- Stats at Baseball Reference

Teams
- California Angels (1976)

Harry Michael Overy (January 27, 1951 – September 22, 2021) was an American professional baseball pitcher. He played in five games during the 1976 season for the California Angels of Major League Baseball. Overy graduated from Olivet Nazarene University.
