= Ken Kravec =

American baseball player (born 1951)

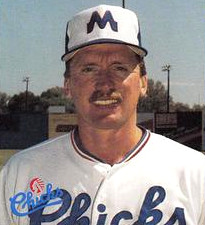
- Kravec in 1988
- Pitcher
- Born: July 29, 1951 (age 75); Cleveland, Ohio, U.S.
- Batted: Left Threw: Left

MLB debut
- September 4, 1975, for the Chicago White Sox

Last MLB appearance
- October 3, 1982, for the Chicago Cubs

MLB statistics
- Win–loss record: 43–56
- Earned run average: 4.47
- Strikeouts: 557
- Stats at Baseball Reference

Teams
- Chicago White Sox (1975–1980); Chicago Cubs (1981–1982)

Kenneth Peter Kravec (born July 29, 1951) is an American professional baseball scout and a former Major League pitcher and front office official. The 6 ft 2 in (1.88 m), 185 lb (84 kg) left-hander appeared in 160 games pitched, 128 as a starter, exclusively for the White Sox (1975–80) and Cubs (1981–82).

Kravec graduated from Midpark High School, Middleburg Heights, Ohio, played college baseball at Ashland University, and was selected by the White Sox in the third round (69th overall) of the 1973 Major League Baseball draft. He was promoted to the White Sox in September 1975 after posting a record of 14–7 and an earned run average of 2.41 and was named to the Double-A Southern League's all-star team. In his Major League debut on September 4, he started against the Kansas City Royals but lasted only 2 1/3 innings, giving up only one hit but allowing seven bases on balls and three earned runs, taking the loss in a 7–1 Kansas City win.

Kravec led all White Sox pitchers in strikeouts from 1977–79, and topped the ChiSox in wins in 1979 with 15. He led the American League in hit batsmen in 1978 (with ten) and tied for the lead in 1979 (14), and finished second in the National League in that category (4) in strike-shortened 1981.

Kravec was the last pitcher to face Thurman Munson, the night before the legendary catcher's tragic death. Kravec walked Munson in the first inning, then struck him out in the third, before Munson was removed early in a Yankees' blowout win at Comiskey Park.

After the White Sox signed free agent catcher Carlton Fisk during the 1980–81 offseason, Fisk found that Kravec was sporting the No. 27 uniform the future Hall of Famer had previously worn with the Boston Red Sox. As a result, Fisk reversed the digits and would wear No. 72 during his 13-year career with Chicago. Both numbers have been retired by their respective teams. Ironically, Kravec was traded to the Cubs (the crosstown rivals of the White Sox) for right-hander Dennis Lamp on March 28, 1981, just a few weeks into Fisk's tenure with the club.

All told, Kravec allowed 814 hits and 404 bases on balls in 8582/3 Major League innings pitched, with 557 strikeouts, six shutouts, 24 complete games, and one save. His one save came on May 9, 1979, when he recorded the final out of the game to nail down a 5-4 victory over the Tigers.

After his active career ended, he remained involved in baseball as a scout for the Royals, Florida Marlins, Cubs and Tampa Bay Rays.
