= Greg Thayer =

American baseball player (1949–2025)

- Pitcher
- Born: October 23, 1949; Cedar Rapids, Iowa, U.S.
- Died: December 12, 2025 (aged 76); St. Cloud, Minnesota, U.S.
- Batted: Right Threw: Right

MLB debut
- April 7, 1978, for the Minnesota Twins

Last MLB appearance
- June 26, 1978, for the Minnesota Twins

MLB statistics
- Win–loss record: 1–1
- Earned run average: 3.80
- Strikeouts: 30
- Stats at Baseball Reference

Teams
- Minnesota Twins (1978)

Gregory Allen Thayer (October 23, 1949 – December 12, 2025) was an American pitcher in Major League Baseball. He played for the Minnesota Twins in 1978. Thayer died on December 12, 2025, at the age of 76.
