= Tippy Martinez =

American baseball player (born 1950)

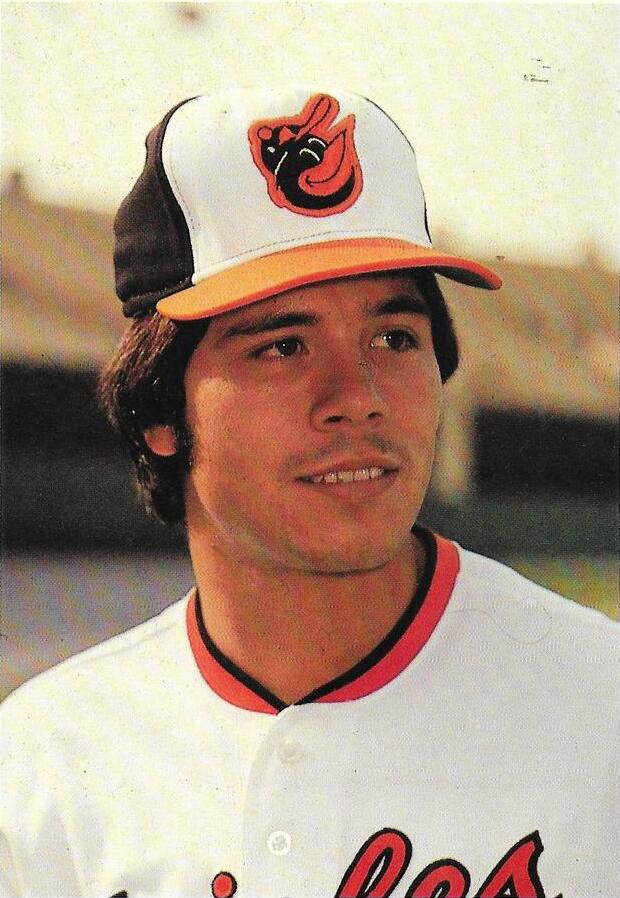
- Martinez in 1976
- Pitcher
- Born: May 31, 1950 (age 75); La Junta, Colorado, U.S.
- Batted: Left Threw: Left

MLB debut
- August 9, 1974, for the New York Yankees

Last MLB appearance
- April 18, 1988, for the Minnesota Twins

MLB statistics
- Win–loss record: 55–42
- Earned run average: 3.45
- Strikeouts: 632
- Saves: 115
- Stats at Baseball Reference

Teams
- New York Yankees (1974–1976); Baltimore Orioles (1976–1986); Minnesota Twins (1988)

Career highlights and awards
- All-Star (1983); World Series champion (1983); Baltimore Orioles Hall of Fame

Felix Anthony "Tippy" Martinez (born May 31, 1950) is an American former professional baseball left-handed pitcher. He pitched 14 seasons in Major League Baseball (MLB) between 1974 and 1988, primarily as a relief pitcher. The majority of his career (1976–1986) was spent as a member of the Baltimore Orioles, where he was a member of 1983 World Series championship team.

== Career ==
Martinez was drafted by the Washington Senators in the 35th round of the 1969 amateur draft, but did not sign with the team. He began his MLB career with the New York Yankees in 1974 after signing as a free agent.

He was acquired along with Rick Dempsey, Scott McGregor, Rudy May and Dave Pagan by the Orioles for Ken Holtzman, Doyle Alexander, Elrod Hendricks, Grant Jackson and Jimmy Freeman at the trade deadline on 15 June 1976. He, Dempsey and McGregor became part of a nucleus that enabled the Orioles to continue as perennial contenders for the next decade, culminating with the 1983 World Series championship.

=== Three pickoffs against Toronto ===
A notable Martinez achievement during the 1983 season was picking off Barry Bonnell, Dave Collins and Willie Upshaw at first base in a single frame of a ten-inning 7–4 win over the Toronto Blue Jays at Memorial Stadium on August 24. The Orioles, having replaced both their starting catcher and his backup while rallying to tie the game in the ninth inning, entered the tenth with reserve infielder Lenn Sakata in the game at catcher. Three consecutive Blue Jays hitters reached first base and each one, thinking it would be easy to steal a base on Sakata, took a big lead. Martinez picked off all three baserunners, then became the winning pitcher when the Orioles won the game on Sakata's home run in the bottom of the tenth.

=== 1983 playoffs ===
He was on the mound when the Orioles clinched the division title in a 5–1 victory over the Brewers at Milwaukee County Stadium on September 25 and the pennant in Game 4 of the American League Championship Series, earning a save and a win respectively.

A grassroots fan club was created for Tippy Martinez near the bullpen in left field of Memorial Stadium in 1980, called "Tippy's Tweeters". Fans blew on an official Oriole Tweeter every time Martinez entered a game as a reliever, and when he struck out the side.

Martinez finished his MLB career with the Minnesota Twins in 1988. He posted a lifetime win–loss record of 55–42 with an ERA of 3.45. He also recorded 115 saves.

In December 2006, Martinez became the pitching coach of the York Revolution of the Atlantic League of Professional Baseball.

== See also ==
- List of Major League Baseball leaders in games finished
