= Geoff Zahn =

American baseball player (born 1945)

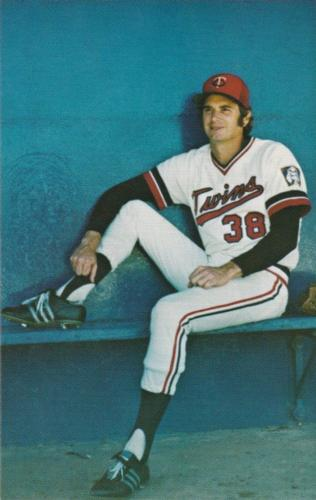
- Pitcher
- Born: December 19, 1945 (age 80); Baltimore, Maryland, U.S.
- Batted: Left Threw: Left

MLB debut
- September 2, 1973, for the Los Angeles Dodgers

Last MLB appearance
- August 14, 1985, for the California Angels

MLB statistics
- Win–loss record: 111–109
- Earned run average: 3.74
- Strikeouts: 705
- Stats at Baseball Reference

Teams
- Los Angeles Dodgers (1973–1975); Chicago Cubs (1975–1976); Minnesota Twins (1977–1980); California Angels (1981–1985)

Geoffrey Clayton Zahn (born December 19, 1945) is an American former professional baseball pitcher. He pitched thirteen seasons in Major League Baseball from 1973 to 1985. In his career, he had a Win–loss record of 111–109, an earned run average of 3.74, and 705 strikeouts.

== Playing career ==
=== Amateur and minors ===
Zahn played for Toledo DeVilbiss High School and the University of Michigan. He was selected by the Los Angeles Dodgers in the fifth round of the January 1968 Major League Baseball draft. After signing with the Dodgers, he played in the minor leagues for six years, as the team sought for him to pitch harder along with finding a "trick pitch". They brought in Roger Craig, then a minor league pitching instructor to help Zahn, who ended up learning the forkball. He finally made his major league debut on September 2, 1973.

Zahn served in the Washington Air National Guard as a member of the 141st Air Refueling Wing; he subsequently reached the rank of staff sergeant. When he made the major leagues, he transferred to the Michigan National Guard; in total, he served six years in the National Guard.

=== Major leagues ===
During his major league career, Zahn pitched with the Los Angeles Dodgers, who traded him for Burt Hooton in 1975.

Landing with the Chicago Cubs of the National League, he played in only 19 games in two years while spending most of his time in the minor leagues. He asked for his release in 1977. Gene Mauch, manager of the Minnesota Twins of the American League, soon asked if Zahn would do some throwing for their pitching coach Don McMahon, and the throwing session was favorable enough to get an invite to training camp and later be signed. Zahn wound up winning ten or more games for six consecutive seasons (1977–1982), totaling 81 wins over that span.

He became a free agent in 1981 and landed with the California Angels, now managed by Mauch. Zahn went through an array of injuries with the Angels, ranging from his knees to an inflamed shoulder but wound up playing his best baseball with California. At one point, he went 292 consecutive innings pitched without allowing a stolen base. Zahn's best season came in 1982 when he compiled an 18–8 record, helping the Angels win the American League Western Division crown. Zahn was selected as the left-handed pitcher on the Sporting News AL All-Star Team after the 1982 season. He announced his retirement in 1986 prior to spring training due to requiring surgery to what turned out to be a torn rotator cuff. It was the eighth and final surgery of his professional career.

== Coaching career ==
After retiring in 1986, he took a job at The Master's College in Newhall to oversee the athletic program along with being a baseball recruiter and pitching coach. In 1994, he became an assistant coach at Pepperdine; Pat Harrison, who hired him for the job, had been coach at The Master's College from 1987 to 1990. Randy Wolf credited Zahn with helping with his mechanics when he played at Pepperdine and later became a major league pitcher.

In 1996, he was hired to serve as head coach of the Michigan baseball. He compiled a record 163–169–2 over six seasons, leading the Wolverines to a championship in the 1999 Big Ten Tournament before announcing his resignation in 2002.
