= Dan Ford =

American baseball player (born 1952)

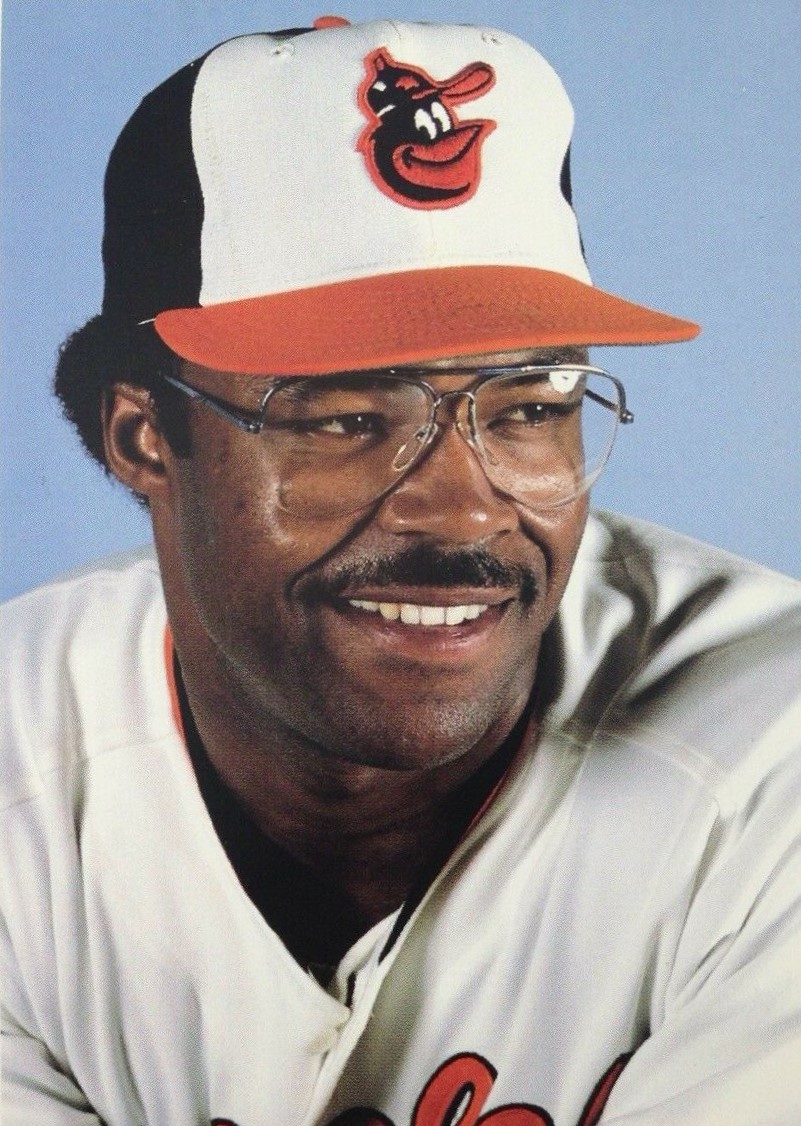
- Outfielder
- Born: May 19, 1952 (age 74); Los Angeles, California, U.S.
- Batted: Right Threw: Right

MLB debut
- April 12, 1975, for the Minnesota Twins

Last MLB appearance
- May 31, 1985, for the Baltimore Orioles

MLB statistics
- Batting average: .270
- Home runs: 121
- Runs batted in: 566
- Stats at Baseball Reference

Teams
- Minnesota Twins (1975–1978); California Angels (1979–1981); Baltimore Orioles (1982–1985)

Career highlights and awards
- World Series champion (1983)

Darnell Glenn Ford (born May 19, 1952) is an American former professional baseball player. Nicknamed "Disco Dan", he played in the Major Leagues primarily as an outfielder from 1975 to 1985 for the Minnesota Twins, California Angels, and Baltimore Orioles. He was the starting right fielder with the 1983 World Series Champion Orioles. In 1,153 career games, Ford had a batting average of .270, 121 home runs and 566 runs batted in (RBI).

== Early life ==
Ford went to John C. Fremont High School in Los Angeles, California. He served in the United States Army.

== Career ==
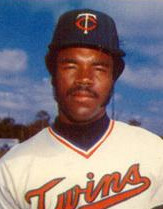
Ford with the Minnesota Twins

Ford was picked 18th overall in the 1970 Major League Baseball draft by the Oakland Athletics. He spent four years in the minor league system for the Athletics before he was traded on October 23, 1974, to the Twins with Dennis Myers for Pat Bourque. For the next four seasons, Ford was a regular in the Twins' lineup. He hit the first home run at the renovated Yankee Stadium off Rudy May on the fifth pitch of the game after Jerry Terrell led off with a four-pitch walk in an 11–4 loss on April 15, 1976. On August 10, 1979, Ford hit for the cycle for the Angels against the Seattle Mariners. He succeeded Lyman Bostock as the Twins' starting center fielder in 1978, batting .274 with 82 RBI.

Ford was traded from the Twins to the Angels for Ron Jackson and Danny Goodwin on December 4, 1978. He was tagged out by Doug DeCinces while attempting to advance to third base on a force play that ended Game 2 of the 1979 American League Championship Series. Both Ford and DeCinces were exchanged for each other 2 1/3 years later in a trade that also sent Jeff Schneider from the Orioles to the Angels and was announced on January 28, 1982. The deal was delayed when Ford requested additional compensation because the Orioles were not one of six teams listed in his contract to which he could be traded without approval. The transaction became official upon his approval two days later on January 30. The Orioles had tried to trade for Ford previously, but were unable to after the Angels originally picked him up.

Early in the Orioles' 1983 championship season at Memorial Stadium on May 18, Ford ended Richard Dotson's bid for a no-hitter with a one-out opposite-field solo home run over the right-field fence in the eighth inning as the team's lone hit and the only run of the game in a 1–0 victory over the Chicago White Sox. Ford later hit a home run off Philadelphia Phillies' Steve Carlton for the Orioles in Game 3 of the 1983 World Series.

Ford spent much of his four years with the Orioles on the disabled list and was on the active roster for 302 out of a possible 647 games. He batted .187 with one home run and one RBI in 28 games during a 1985 campaign that was abbreviated when he underwent an arthroscopy on his left knee on July 17. The knee surgery was his fourth since November 1979. He was released by the Orioles six months later on January 23, 1986.

== See also ==
- List of Major League Baseball players to hit for the cycle

Achievements
Preceded by George Brett	Hitting for the cycle August 10, 1979	Succeeded by Bob Watson
