= Roy Smalley III =

American baseball player (born 1952)

Roy Smalley
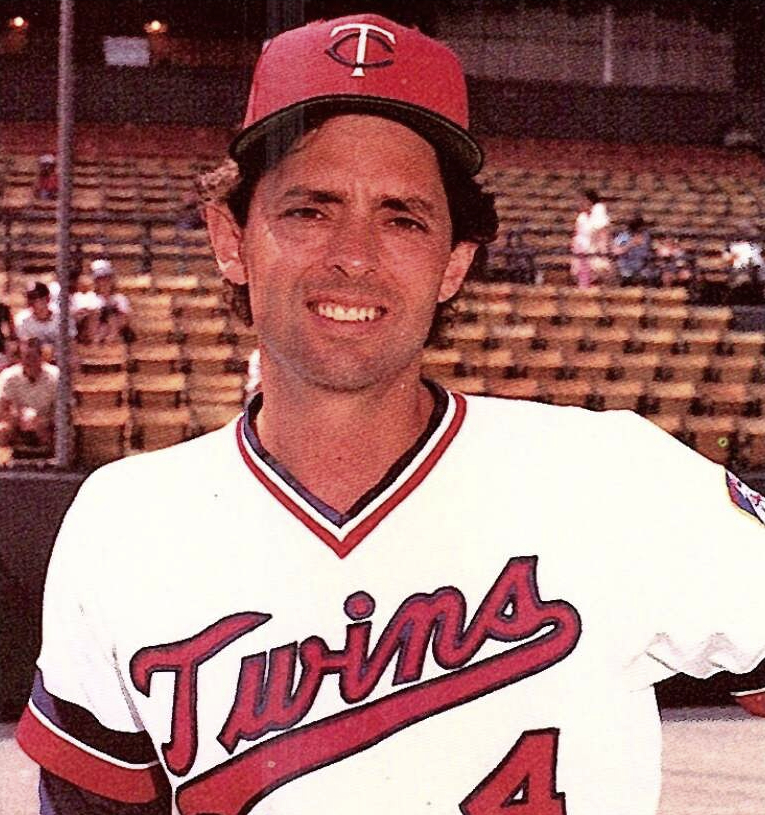
- Smalley with the Minnesota Twins c. 1985
- Shortstop
- Born: October 25, 1952 (age 73); Los Angeles, California, U.S.
- Batted: Switch Threw: Right

MLB debut
- April 30, 1975, for the Texas Rangers

Last MLB appearance
- October 4, 1987, for the Minnesota Twins

MLB statistics
- Batting average: .257
- Home runs: 163
- Runs batted in: 694
- Stats at Baseball Reference

Teams
- Texas Rangers (1975–1976); Minnesota Twins (1976–1982); New York Yankees (1982–1984); Chicago White Sox (1984); Minnesota Twins (1985–1987)

Career highlights and awards
- All-Star (1979); World Series champion (1987)

Roy Frederick Smalley III (born October 25, 1952) is an American former professional baseball shortstop who played in Major League Baseball (MLB) from 1975 through 1987 for the Texas Rangers (1975–76), Minnesota Twins (1976–82; 1985–87), New York Yankees (1982–84), and Chicago White Sox (1984). Smalley was a switch-hitter and threw right-handed. His father, Roy Jr., was also an MLB league shortstop, and his uncle, Gene Mauch, was a long-time MLB manager and infielder.

== Amateur career ==
Drafted out of Westchester High School in Los Angeles in 1970 by the Montreal Expos, Smalley played college baseball for one year at Los Angeles City College, then transferred to the University of Southern California. He was part of the 1972 and 1973 College World Series championship teams under longtime head coach Rod Dedeaux. Smalley was named an All-American and received All-College World Series honors in 1973.

He was drafted four times by major league teams between 1970 and 1973 without signing. Smalley was selected by the Montreal Expos in the 35th round of the June 1970 draft, by the Boston Red Sox in the 4th round of the January 1971 draft, by the St. Louis Cardinals in the 2nd round of the June 1971 draft, and again by the Red Sox in the 5th round of the January 1972 draft. Smalley was the number one overall pick in the January 1974 amateur draft by the Rangers. Following his junior year, he stayed out of school in the fall of 1973 to be eligible for the January free agent draft.

== Professional career ==
=== Rangers ===
After signing in January, Smalley had wrist surgery in February, injured while playing semi-pro ball in December. He was sent to the Pittsfield Rangers in the Double-A Eastern League, hitting .251 with 14 home runs and 42 RBI. Following a stint with the Triple-A Spokane Indians in the Pacific Coast League, Smalley was promoted to the big leagues permanently, seeing time in 78 games for the Rangers in 1975, hitting .228 with 3 home runs. Smalley started the 1976 season back in Texas, but did not improve on his 1975 average.

=== Twins ===
On June 1, 1976, Smalley was traded to the Twins, along with Texas infielder Mike Cubbage, pitchers Jim Gideon and Bill Singer and cash, for Bert Blyleven and shortstop Danny Thompson, who was battling leukemia. Smalley was inserted into the Twins' starting lineup and manned shortstop until 1982.

Smalley's best season came in 1979, when he was voted the starting shortstop for the American League in the All-Star game. After the first half of the season, Smalley had the second-highest batting average in the major leagues (.341). Smalley established career highs in runs, RBIs, and home runs, and was named the shortstop on The Sporting News AL All-Star team. He also led the league in games played, plate appearances, all fielders in assists, and all shortstops in putouts, while hitting .271 and leading the team with 24 home runs and 95 RBI. Due to injuries, he played only 133 games in 1980 and 56 in 1981.

=== Yankees, White Sox, and Twins Again ===
After showing that he had recovered from his injuries, Smalley was traded in 1982 on April 10 to the Yankees for pitchers Ron Davis and Paul Boris and shortstop Greg Gagne. With the Yankees, Smalley hit 20 home runs in 1982 and 18 in 1983. Yankee pitcher Tommy John thought he was best as a designated hitter: "He had no range at short. No range at all. He was bad news for a pitching staff". John did note that Smalley was a much better hitter than Bucky Dent. After starting the 1984 season hitting .239 with 7 home runs and 26 RBI over the first 67 games of the season, Smalley was traded again, this time to the White Sox for middle reliever Kevin Hickey and future Pittsburgh Pirates Cy Young and 155-game winner Doug Drabek.

Smalley was a member of Minnesota's 1987 World Championship team. He hit .275 with 8 home runs and 34 RBI in 110 games in his last major league season. In a 13-season career, Smalley posted a .257 batting average with 163 home runs and 694 RBI in 1653 games played.

== Post-playing career ==
Smalley was inducted into the USC Athletic Hall of Fame in 2007. Smalley worked for Bally Sports North as an analyst during Minnesota Twins games. In 2010, Smalley opened a restaurant near Target Field, called Smalley's '87 Club, which closed in February 2012. As of 2022, Smalley serves as the President on the Board of Directors for the nonprofit organization Pitch in for Baseball. He was inducted into the College Baseball Hall of Fame in 2013.

== See also ==
- List of second-generation Major League Baseball players
