= Paul Thormodsgard =

American baseball player (born 1953)

- Pitcher
- Born: November 10, 1953 (age 72); San Francisco, California, U.S.
- Batted: Right Threw: Right

MLB debut
- April 10, 1977, for the Minnesota Twins

Last MLB appearance
- September 8, 1979, for the Minnesota Twins

MLB statistics
- Win–loss record: 12–21
- Earned run average: 4.74
- Strikeouts: 118
- Stats at Baseball Reference

Teams
- Minnesota Twins (1977–1979)

Paul Gayton Thormodsgard (born November 10, 1953) is an American former Major League Baseball pitcher who played in the late 1970s. He threw and batted right-handed. Thormodsgard played three seasons in the majors, all of them as a member of the Minnesota Twins from 1977 to 1979. In 50 career games, Thormodsgard had a 12–21 record with an ERA of 4.74. He allowed 4 home runs, 33 runs, and had 118 strikeouts.

In 1977, Thormodsgard started 37 games while posting an 11–15 record and striking out 94 batters. In Thormodsgard's final season in 1979, he pitched one inning in one game in relief, allowing one run and getting a no decision.
