= Willie Norwood (baseball) =

American baseball player

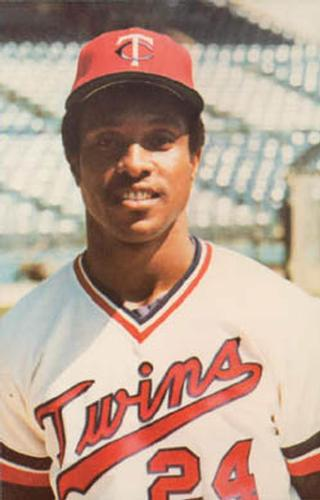
- Outfielder
- Born: November 7, 1950 (age 75); Greene County, Alabama, U.S.
- Batted: Right Threw: Right

MLB debut
- April 21, 1977, for the Minnesota Twins

Last MLB appearance
- October 4, 1980, for the Minnesota Twins

MLB statistics
- Batting average: .242
- Home runs: 18
- Runs batted in: 93
- Stats at Baseball Reference

Teams
- Minnesota Twins (1977–1980)

Willie Norwood (born November 7, 1950) is an American former Major League Baseball outfielder. He played for the Minnesota Twins from 1977 to 1980.

In 294 games over four seasons, Norwood posted a .242 batting average (207-for-854) with 109 runs, 18 home runs, 93 RBI and 41 stolen bases. He finished his career with a .959 fielding percentage playing at all three outfield positions.
