= Luis Gómez (baseball) =

Mexican baseball player (born 1951)

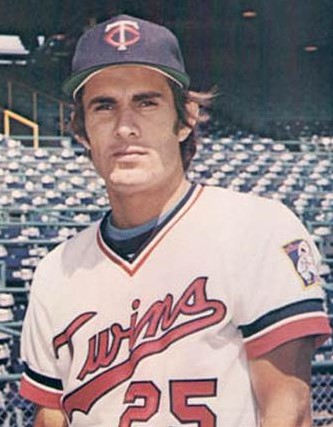
- Shortstop
- Born: August 19, 1951 (age 74); Guadalajara, Jalisco, Mexico
- Batted: Right Threw: Right

MLB debut
- April 28, 1974, for the Minnesota Twins

Last MLB appearance
- October 4, 1981, for the Atlanta Braves

MLB statistics
- Batting average: .210
- Home runs: 0
- Runs batted in: 90
- Stats at Baseball Reference

Teams
- Minnesota Twins (1974–1977); Toronto Blue Jays (1978–1979); Atlanta Braves (1980–1981)

Luis Gómez (born August 19, 1951) is a Mexican former professional baseball shortstop who played during the 1970s and 1980s. Born in Guadalajara, Jalisco, Mexico in 1951 and raised in the Echo Park neighborhood of Los Angeles, he attended and graduated from Nightingale Jr. High, then attended Belmont High School in Los Angeles, California and UCLA.

In 1969 Luis set two records in baseball and football at Belmont High with a .559 batting average and with 2,148 total yards as a quarterback. The 5'9" Gómez played on the UCLA baseball team for three years ('71-'73) at shortstop. There he compiled a batting average of .272, 2 HR, including a grand slam, and 34 RBI. During his senior year, his batting average was .301 in 52 games and 186 at bats.

Luis started his major league baseball career with the Minnesota Twins in 1974, playing with them until 1977. Then in 1978 he signed as a free agent with the Toronto Blue Jays where he set a single season team record of 19 sacrifice bunts (which still stands). In 1980 he was traded to the Atlanta Braves, playing his two remaining seasons there and retiring in 1982. Luis set an Atlanta record in 1980 with a .968 fielding percentage at shortstop and strung together 42 consecutive errorless games. He played shortstop, second base, and third base in 609 major league games.
