= Gary Serum =

American baseball player (born 1956)

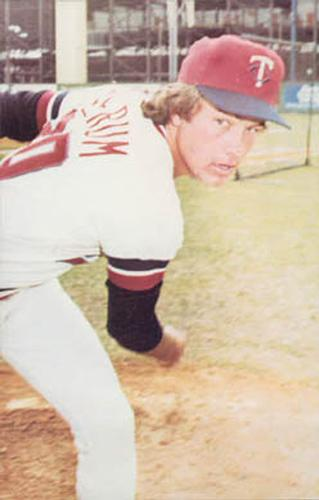
- Pitcher
- Born: October 24, 1956 (age 69); Fargo, North Dakota, U.S.
- Batted: Right Threw: Right

MLB debut
- July 22, 1977, for the Minnesota Twins

Last MLB appearance
- September 29, 1979, for the Minnesota Twins

MLB statistics
- Win–loss record: 10–12
- Earned run average: 4.72
- Strikeouts: 125
- Stats at Baseball Reference

Teams
- Minnesota Twins (1977–1979)

Gary Wayne Serum (born October 24, 1956) is an American former Major League Baseball pitcher. He played 2 1/2 seasons at the major league level for the Minnesota Twins. He was signed by the Twins as an amateur free agent in 1975. Serum played his last professional season with the New York Yankees' Double-A Nashville Sounds and Triple-A Columbus Clippers in 1982. Serum grew up in Alexandria, Minnesota and graduated from Alexandria Area High School.
