= Jim Hughes (1970s pitcher) =

American baseball player (born 1951)

- Pitcher
- Born: August 11, 1951 (age 73); Los Angeles, California, U.S.
- Batted: Right Threw: Right

MLB debut
- September 14, 1974, for the Minnesota Twins

Last MLB appearance
- April 19, 1977, for the Minnesota Twins

MLB statistics
- Win–loss record: 25–30
- Earned run average: 4.30
- Strikeouts: 226
- Stats at Baseball Reference

Teams
- Minnesota Twins (1974–1977)

James Michael Hughes (born August 11, 1951) is a former Major League Baseball pitcher. He pitched all or part of four seasons in the majors, from 1974 until 1977, all with the Minnesota Twins. His nickname was "Bluegill".

== Baseball career ==
Hughes was selected out of St. Bernard High School (Los Angeles) by the Minnesota Twins in the 33rd round (762 overall) of the 1969 June Amateur Baseball Draft.
