= Pete Redfern =

American baseball player (born 1954)

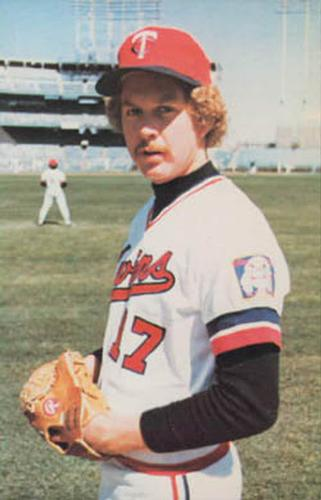
- Pitcher
- Born: August 25, 1954 (age 71); Glendale, California, U.S.
- Batted: Right Threw: Right

MLB debut
- May 15, 1976, for the Minnesota Twins

Last MLB appearance
- September 5, 1982, for the Minnesota Twins

MLB statistics
- Win–loss record: 42–48
- Earned run average: 4.54
- Strikeouts: 426
- Stats at Baseball Reference

Teams
- Minnesota Twins (1976–1982)
Medals
Men's baseball
Representing United States
Pan American Games
Silver medal – second place	1975 Mexico City	Team

Peter Irvine Redfern (born August 25, 1954) is an American former professional baseball pitcher. He had a seven-season career in Major League Baseball, from 1976 until 1982, all with the Minnesota Twins.

Redfern was the Twins' first-round pick, and the first pick overall in the secondary phase of the 1976 draft. After pitching in just four games in the minor leagues with the Tacoma Twins, he made his major league debut on May 15 against the California Angels. Although he gave up four runs in five innings, he was the winning pitcher (beating Sid Monge) in a 15–5 Twins victory.

On April 6, 1982, Redfern was the starting pitcher in the first Twins game at the Hubert H. Humphrey Metrodome on Opening Day, facing the Seattle Mariners. He lost the game to Floyd Bannister. That season would be his last with the Twins, as he was released at the end on March 25, 1983. Shortly afterwards, Redfern came into dispute with Minnesota Twins over how much money he was owed. A released player in 1983 would get $26,000 severance pay but Redfern and his lawyers said x-rays showed he had an elbow injury and therefore the Twins owed him $160,000. He signed with the Los Angeles Dodgers, but appeared in just six games for their top farm team, the Albuquerque Dukes that season.

In October 1983, Redfern was almost killed in a diving accident at Newport Beach, California, which left him paralyzed and ended his playing career. He uses a wheelchair but is able to walk short distances with a walker. His son, Chad, was a minor league pitcher.
