= Dave Goltz =

American baseball player (born 1949)

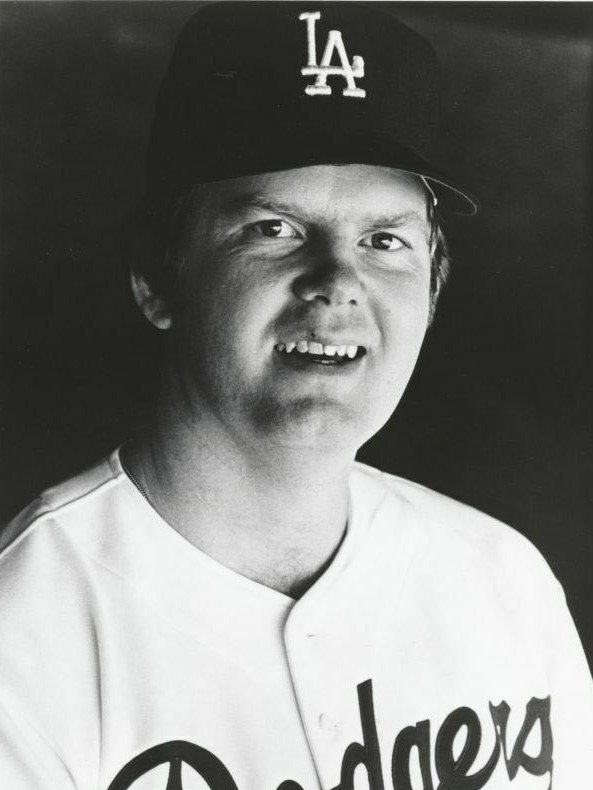
- Pitcher
- Born: June 23, 1949 (age 77); Pelican Rapids, Minnesota, U.S.
- Batted: Right Threw: Right

MLB debut
- July 18, 1972, for the Minnesota Twins

Last MLB appearance
- June 22, 1983, for the California Angels

MLB statistics
- Win–loss record: 113–109
- Earned run average: 3.69
- Strikeouts: 1,105
- Stats at Baseball Reference

Teams
- Minnesota Twins (1972–1979); Los Angeles Dodgers (1980–1982); California Angels (1982–1983)

Career highlights and awards
- World Series champion (1981); AL wins leader (1977)

David Allan Goltz (born June 23, 1949) is an American former professional baseball player who pitched in the Major Leagues from 1972 to 1983.

== Biography ==
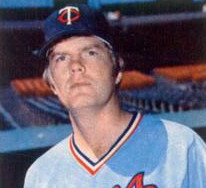
Goltz with the Minnesota Twins

Dave Goltz attended high school in Rothsay, Minnesota where he was a multi-sport star athlete. Goltz signed with the Twins organization out of high school for $20,000. He began his career with the Twins in the Gulf Coast Rookie League in 1967 and moved up to single-A St. Cloud in 1968. He served in the U.S. Army Reserves as a helicopter mechanic and his unit was called to active duty in 1969, postponing his baseball career. He returned to the minors after his Army obligation in 1970 and hurt his arm in AA. After rehab, he spent 1971 with two single-A teams, going a combined 14–3 with Orlando and Lynchburg. He moved to AAA Tacoma in 1972 and was called up to the majors in July 1972 when Jim Kaat went on the disabled list. He won his first Major League start against the Milwaukee Brewers.

After going 6-4 his rookie season, Goltz had three consecutive seasons of .500 records, 8–8 in 1974 and back-to-back 14–14 seasons in 1975 and 1976. In 1977, Goltz won a career-high 20 games for the Twins and tied with Dennis Leonard and Jim Palmer for most wins in the American League.

Goltz appeared in the 1981 World Series as a member of the Dodgers.

== See also ==
- List of Major League Baseball annual wins leaders
