= Tom Johnson (1970s pitcher) =

American baseball player

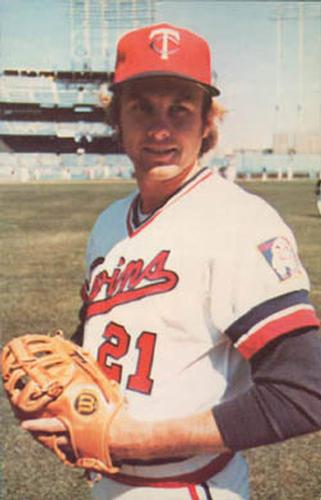
- Pitcher
- Born: April 2, 1951 (age 75); Saint Paul, Minnesota, U.S.
- Batted: Right Threw: Right

MLB debut
- September 10, 1974, for the Minnesota Twins

Last MLB appearance
- September 27, 1978, for the Minnesota Twins

MLB statistics
- Win–loss record: 23–14
- Earned run average: 3.39
- Strikeouts: 166
- Stats at Baseball Reference

Teams
- Minnesota Twins (1974–1978)

Thomas Raymond Johnson (born April 2, 1951) is an American former Major League Baseball pitcher. He played five seasons in the majors, from 1974 until 1978 for the Minnesota Twins. He pitched in 129 games during his career, all but one as a reliever.

Johnson was signed as an undrafted free agent in 1970. After five years in the Twins' minor league system, he made his major league debut on September 10, 1974. Johnson racked up twenty-three wins and twenty-two saves as a relief pitcher over five years with the Twins, including sixteen in 1977.

After the 1978 season, Johnson was released, and signed eight months later by the Chicago White Sox. He became a starter for the White Sox AA affiliate in Glens Falls, but was largely unsuccessful. In the Spring of 1981, Johnson retired at the age of twenty-nine.

From 2016-2025, Johnson served as a Mission Pastor at Church of the Open Door in Maple Grove, Minnesota. Prior to that he and his wife Deborah led the non-profit (NGO) GoodSports International, www.goodsports.sk in Slovakia. Currently he is back with GoodSports as Executive Director working to expand the program into additional communities.
