= Dave Johnson (1970s pitcher) =

American baseball player (born 1948)

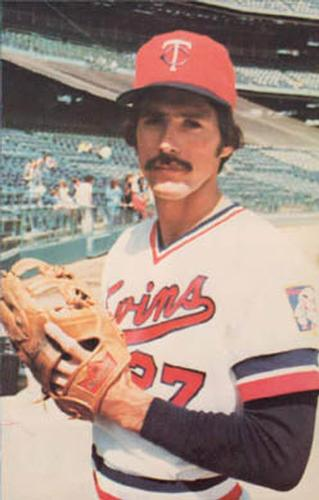
- Pitcher
- Born: October 4, 1948 (age 77); Abilene, Texas, U.S.
- Batted: Right Threw: Right

MLB debut
- July 2, 1974, for the Baltimore Orioles

Last MLB appearance
- May 10, 1978, for the Minnesota Twins

MLB statistics
- Win–loss record: 4–10
- Earned run average: 4.64
- Strikeouts: 50
- Stats at Baseball Reference

Teams
- Baltimore Orioles (1974–1975); Minnesota Twins (1977–1978)

David Charles Johnson (born October 4, 1948) is an American former professional baseball pitcher. He played all or part of four seasons in Major League Baseball between 1974 and 1978 for the Baltimore Orioles and Minnesota Twins. Though Johnson was the very first player acquired by the Seattle Mariners (purchased from the Orioles prior to the 1976 Major League Baseball expansion draft), and had a 1977 Topps baseball card that showed him as a Mariner, Johnson did not make the team out of spring training. He was sold to Minnesota in May, and spent the 1977 and 1978 seasons with the Twins.
