= Jeff Holly =

American baseball player (born 1953)

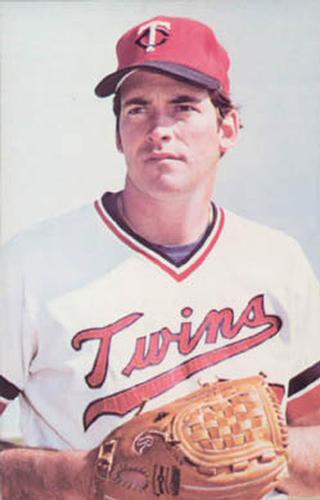
- Pitcher
- Born: March 1, 1953 (age 73); San Pedro, California, U.S.
- Batted: Left Threw: Left

MLB debut
- May 1, 1977, for the Minnesota Twins

Last MLB appearance
- April 28, 1979, for the Minnesota Twins

MLB statistics
- Win–loss record: 3–4
- Earned run average: 5.60
- Strikeouts: 49
- Stats at Baseball Reference

Teams
- Minnesota Twins (1977–1979)

Jeffrey Owen Holly (born March 1, 1953) is an American former professional baseball pitcher. He played parts of three seasons in the Major League Baseball from 1977 until 1979, all for the Minnesota Twins. After the 1979 season he was traded to the Detroit Tigers for Fernando Arroyo.
