= 1982 New York Yankees season =

Season for the Major League Baseball team the New York Yankees

1982 New York Yankees
- League: American League
- Division: East
- Ballpark: Yankee Stadium
- City: New York City
- Record: 79-83 (.488)
- Owners: George Steinbrenner
- General managers: Bill Bergesch
- Managers: Gene Michael, Bob Lemon, Clyde King
- Television: WPIX (Phil Rizzuto, Frank Messer, Bill White); SportsChannel NY (Mel Allen, Fran Healy, others from WPIX)
- Radio: WABC (AM) (Frank Messer, Phil Rizzuto, Bill White, John Gordon)

The 1982 New York Yankees season was the 80th season for the Yankees. The team finished in fifth place in the American League East with a record of 79–83, finishing 16 games behind the AL Champion Milwaukee Brewers. As a result, the Yankees endured their first losing season since going 80–82 in 1973, the team's final season at the original Yankee Stadium before the 1976 renovations. The Yankees were managed by Gene Michael, Bob Lemon, and Clyde King. The Yankees played their home games at Yankee Stadium.

Mel Allen, the longtime Yankees play-by-play commentator, returned for the Yankees broadcasts on SportsChannel New York with Fran Healy, with former partner Phil Rizzuto alternating with him. Allen had been a familiar face to many for several years since his return to television in 1975 as the voice-over narrator and presenter for the hit program This Week in Baseball.

== Offseason ==
- October 13, 1981: Eric Soderholm was released by the New York Yankees.
- October 21, 1981: Willie McGee was traded by the Yankees to the St. Louis Cardinals for Bob Sykes.
- November 4, 1981: Brian Ryder (minors) and a player to be named later were traded by the Yankees to the Cincinnati Reds for Ken Griffey, Sr. The Yankees completed the deal by sending Freddie Toliver to the Reds on December 9.
- November 17, 1981: Aurelio Rodríguez was traded by the New York Yankees to the Toronto Blue Jays for a player to be named later. The Toronto Blue Jays sent Mike Lebo (minors) (December 9, 1981) to the New York Yankees to complete the trade.
- February 22, 1982: Barry Evans was purchased by the Yankees from the San Diego Padres.
- March 30, 1982: Andy McGaffigan and Ted Wilborn were traded by the Yankees to the San Francisco Giants for Doyle Alexander.

== Regular season ==
- April 6, 1982, Opening Day vs. the Texas Rangers was snowed out, as a blizzard brought more than a foot of snow to New York; additional games were also postponed due to the stadium not being cleared. The team finally began their season on April 11, with a doubleheader against the Chicago White Sox.
- April 27, 1982, Reggie Jackson returned to Yankee Stadium with the Angels. He broke out of a terrible season-starting slump to hit a home run off former teammate Ron Guidry. The at-bat began with Yankee fans, angry at Steinbrenner for letting Jackson get away, starting the "Reg-GIE!" chant, and ended it with the fans chanting "Steinbrenner sucks!" By the time of Jackson's election to the Hall of Fame in 1993, Steinbrenner had begun to say that letting him go was the biggest mistake he made as Yankee owner.
- September 5, 1982: Roy Smalley hit home runs from both sides of plate for New York Yankees.
- Future NFL Hall of Famer John Elway played baseball for the New York Yankees' Oneonta single-A farm club in 1982. Elway posted a .318 average and knocked in a team-high 24 runs with no errors in 42 games.

=== Season standings ===
AL East
Team	W	L	Pct.	GB	Home	Road
Milwaukee Brewers	95	67	.586	—	48‍–‍34	47‍–‍33
Baltimore Orioles	94	68	.580	1	53‍–‍28	41‍–‍40
Boston Red Sox	89	73	.549	6	49‍–‍32	40‍–‍41
Detroit Tigers	83	79	.512	12	47‍–‍34	36‍–‍45
New York Yankees	79	83	.488	16	42‍–‍39	37‍–‍44
Cleveland Indians	78	84	.481	17	41‍–‍40	37‍–‍44
Toronto Blue Jays	78	84	.481	17	44‍–‍37	34‍–‍47

=== Record vs. opponents ===
1982 American League record Sources:
Team	BAL	BOS	CAL	CWS	CLE	DET	KC	MIL	MIN	NYY	OAK	SEA	TEX	TOR
Baltimore	—	4–9	7–5	5–7	6–7	7–6	4–8	9–4–1	8–4	11–2	7–5	7–5	9–3	10–3
Boston	9–4	—	7–5	4–8	6–7	8–5	6–6	4–9	6–6	7–6	8–4	7–5	10–2	7–6
California	5–7	5–7	—	8–5	8–4	5–7	7–6	6–6	7–6	7–5	9–4	10–3	8–5	8–4
Chicago	7–5	8–4	5–8	—	6–6	9–3	3–10	3–9	7–6	8–4	9–4	6–7	8–5	8–4
Cleveland	7–6	7–6	4–8	6–6	—	6–7	2–10	7–6	8–4	4–9	4–8	9–3	7–5	7–6
Detroit	6–7	5–8	7–5	3–9	7–6	—	6–6	3–10	9–3	8–5	9–3	6–6	8–4	6–7
Kansas City	8–4	6–6	6–7	10–3	10–2	6–6	—	7–5	7–6	5–7	7–6	7–6	7–6	4–8
Milwaukee	4–9–1	9–4	6–6	9–3	6–7	10–3	5–7	—	7–5	8–5	7–5	8–4	7–5	9–4
Minnesota	4–8	6–6	6–7	6–7	4–8	3–9	6–7	5–7	—	2–10	3–10	5–8	5–8	5–7
New York	2–11	6–7	5–7	4–8	9–4	5–8	7–5	5–8	10–2	—	7–5	6–6	7–5	6–7
Oakland	5–7	4–8	4–9	4–9	8–4	3–9	6–7	5–7	10–3	5–7	—	6–7	5–8	3–9
Seattle	5–7	5–7	3–10	7–6	3–9	6–6	6–7	4–8	8–5	6–6	7–6	—	9–4	7–5
Texas	3–9	2–10	5–8	5–8	5–7	4–8	6–7	5–7	8–5	5–7	8–5	4–9	—	4–8
Toronto	3–10	6–7	4–8	4–8	6–7	7–6	8–4	4–9	7–5	7–6	9–3	5–7	8–4	—

=== Notable transactions ===
- April 1, 1982: Bill Caudill was acquired by the Yankees from the Chicago Cubs to complete an earlier deal (the Cubs sent players to be named later to the Yankees for Pat Tabler) made on August 19, 1981.
- April 1, 1982: Bill Caudill, Gene Nelson and a player to be named later were traded by the Yankees to the Seattle Mariners for Shane Rawley. The Yankees completed the deal by sending Bobby Brown to the Mariners on April 6.
- April 5, 1982: Brad Gulden was traded by the Yankees to the Montreal Expos for Bobby Ramos.
- April 10, 1982: Ron Davis, Greg Gagne and Paul Boris were traded by the Yankees to the Minnesota Twins for Roy Smalley III.
- April 23, 1982: Bob Watson was traded by the Yankees to the Atlanta Braves for Scott Patterson (minors).
- May 5, 1982: Dave Revering, Tom Dodd, and Jeff Reynolds (minors) were traded by the Yankees to the Toronto Blue Jays for John Mayberry.
- May 12, 1982: Larry Milbourne, Pete Filsen, John Pacella and cash were traded by the Yankees to the Minnesota Twins for Butch Wynegar and Roger Erickson.
- August 8, 1982: Bucky Dent was traded by the Yankees to the Texas Rangers for Lee Mazzilli.
- August 31, 1982: Tommy John was traded by the Yankees to the California Angels for a player to be named later. The Angels completed the deal by sending Dennis Rasmussen to the Yankees on November 24.

==== Draft picks ====
- June 7, 1982: 1982 Major League Baseball draft
  - Bo Jackson was drafted by the Yankees in the 2nd round, but did not sign.
  - Dan Pasqua was drafted by the Yankees in the 3rd round.
  - B. J. Surhoff was drafted by the Yankees in the 5th round, but did not sign.
  - Jim Deshaies was drafted by the Yankees in the 21st round.
  - Mike York was drafted by the Yankees in the 40th round.

=== Roster ===
1982 New York Yankees
Roster
Pitchers: 52 Doyle Alexander; 35 Roger Erickson; 43 George Frazier; 54 Goose Gossage; 49 Ron Guidry; 53 Jay Howell; 25 Tommy John; 47 Curt Kaufman; 34 Dave LaRoche; 61 Jim Lewis; 45 Rudy May; 50 Lynn McGlothen; 39,63 Mike Morgan; 50 John Pacella; 26,46 Shane Rawley; 19 Dave Righetti; 25 Stefan Wever	Catchers: 10 Rick Cerone; 58 Juan Espino; 23 Barry Foote; 57 Bobby Ramos; 27 Butch Wynegar; Infielders: 36 Steve Balboni; 20 Bucky Dent; 38 Barry Evans; 28 John Mayberry; 24 Lee Mazzilli; 18 Larry Milbourne; 9 Graig Nettles; 30 Willie Randolph; 12 Dave Revering; 18 Andre Robertson; 20 Edwin Rodríguez; 18 Rodney Scott; 34.55 Roy Smalley; 28 Bob Watson	Outfielders: 29 Dave Collins; 6 Ken Griffey; 46 Don Mattingly; 22 Jerry Mumphrey; 18,56 Mike Patterson; 31 Dave Winfield; Other batters: 17 Oscar Gamble; 24,35 Butch Hobson; 2 Bobby Murcer; 14 Lou Piniella; 38 Dave Stegman	Manager: 42 Clyde King; 21 Bob Lemon; 11 Gene Michael; Coaches: 48 Joe Altobelli; 8 Yogi Berra; 33 Mike Ferraro; 42 Clyde King; 41 Jeff Torborg; Mickey Vernon

== Player stats ==
= Indicates team leader

=== Batting ===
==== Starters by position ====
Note: Pos = Position; G = Games played; AB = At bats; R = Runs scored; H = Hits; Avg. = Batting average; HR = Home runs; RBI = Runs batted in; SB = Stolen bases

Pos	Player	G	AB	R	H	Avg.	HR	RBI	SB
C	Rick Cerone	89	300	29	68	.227	5	28	0
1B	John Mayberry	69	215	20	45	.209	8	27	0
2B	Willie Randolph	144	553	85	155	.280	3	36	16
3B	Graig Nettles	122	405	47	94	.232	18	55	1
SS	Roy Smalley	142	486	55	125	.257	20	67	0
LF	Dave Winfield	140	539	84	151	.280	37	106	5
CF	Jerry Mumphrey	123	477	76	143	.300	9	68	11
RF	Ken Griffey	127	484	70	134	.277	12	54	10
DH	Oscar Gamble	108	316	49	86	.272	18	57	6

==== Other batters ====
Note: G = Games played; AB = At bats; R = Runs scored; H = Hits; Avg. = Batting average; HR = Home runs; RBI = Runs batted in; SB = Stolen bases

Player	G	AB	R	H	Avg.	HR	RBI	SB
Dave Collins	111	348	41	88	.253	3	25	13
Lou Piniella	102	261	33	80	.307	6	37	0
Butch Wynegar	63	191	27	56	.293	3	20	0
Bucky Dent	59	160	11	27	.169	0	9	0
Bobby Murcer	65	141	12	32	.227	7	30	2
Lee Mazzilli	37	128	20	34	.266	6	17	2
Andre Robertson	44	118	16	26	.220	2	9	0
Steve Balboni	33	107	8	20	.187	2	4	0
Butch Hobson	30	58	2	10	.172	0	3	0
Barry Foote	17	48	4	7	.146	0	2	0
Dave Revering	14	40	2	6	.150	0	2	0
Barry Evans	17	31	2	8	.258	0	2	0
Larry Milbourne	14	27	2	4	.148	0	0	0
Rodney Scott	10	26	5	5	.192	0	0	2
Bob Watson	7	17	3	4	.235	0	3	0
Mike Patterson	11	16	3	3	.188	1	1	1
Don Mattingly	7	12	0	2	.167	0	1	0
Bobby Ramos	4	11	1	1	.091	1	2	0
Edwin Rodriguez	3	9	2	3	.333	0	1	0
Juan Espino	3	2	0	0	.000	0	0	0
Dave Stegman	2	0	0	0	----	0	0	0

=== Pitching ===
==== Starting pitchers ====
Note: G = Games pitched; IP = Innings pitched; W = Wins; L = Losses; ERA = Earned run average; SO = Strikeouts

Player	G	IP	W	L	ERA	SO
Ron Guidry	34	222.0	14	8	3.81	162
Tommy John	30	186.2	10	10	3.66	54
Dave Righetti	33	183.0	11	10	3.79	163
Mike Morgan	30	150.1	7	11	4.37	71
Roger Erickson	16	70.2	4	5	4.46	37
Doyle Alexander	16	66.2	1	7	6.08	26
Jay Howell	6	28.0	2	3	7.71	21
Stefan Wever	1	2.2	0	1	27.00	2

==== Other pitchers ====
Note: G = Games pitched; IP = Innings pitched; W = Wins; L = Losses; ERA = Earned run average; SO = Strikeouts

Player	G	IP	W	L	ERA	SO
Shane Rawley	47	164.0	11	10	4.06	111
Rudy May	41	106.2	6	6	2.89	85
John Pacella	3	10.0	0	1	7.20	2

==== Relief pitchers ====
Note: G = Games pitched; W = Wins; L = Losses; SV = Saves; ERA = Earned run average; SO = Strikeouts

Player	G	W	L	SV	ERA	SO
Goose Gossage	56	4	5	30	2.23	102
George Frazier	63	4	4	1	3.47	69
Dave LaRoche	25	4	2	0	3.42	31
Curt Kaufman	7	1	0	0	5.19	1
Lynn McGlothen	4	0	0	0	10.80	2
Jim Lewis	1	0	0	0	54.00	0

== Awards and honors ==
- Ron Guidry, Goose Gossage and Dave Winfield represented the Yankees at the 1982 Major League Baseball All-Star Game.
- Gold Gloves were awarded to pitcher, Ron Guidry and outfielder, Dave Winfield.
- Dave Winfield, Silver Slugger Award.

== Farm system ==
Level	Team	League	Manager
AAA	Columbus Clippers	International League	Frank Verdi
AA	Nashville Sounds	Southern League	Johnny Oates
A	Fort Lauderdale Yankees	Florida State League	Stump Merrill
A	Greensboro Hornets	South Atlantic League	Doug Holmquist
A-Short Season	Oneonta Yankees	New York–Penn League	Ken Berry
Rookie	Paintsville Yankees	Appalachian League	Mike Notaro
Rookie	GCL Yankees	Gulf Coast League	Carlos Tosca

LEAGUE CHAMPIONS: Nashville, Fort Lauderdale, Greensboro, GCL Yankees
