= 1982 Minnesota Twins season =

1982 Minnesota Twins
- League: American League
- Division: West
- Ballpark: Hubert H. Humphrey Metrodome
- City: Minneapolis, Minnesota
- Record: 60–102 (.370)
- Divisional place: 7th
- Owners: Calvin Griffith (majority owner, with Thelma Griffith Haynes)
- General managers: Calvin Griffith
- Managers: Billy Gardner
- Television: KMSP-TV (Bob Kurtz, Larry Osterman)
- Radio: 830 WCCO AM (Herb Carneal, Frank Quilici)

The 1982 Minnesota Twins season was the 22nd season for the Minnesota Twins franchise in the Twin Cities of Minnesota, and the 82nd overall in the American League. It was also the Twins' first season at the Hubert H. Humphrey Metrodome, which they would continue to play in until 2009.

The team finished 60–102, seventh in the American League West. It was the first time the Twins lost more than 100 games since moving to Minnesota. This feat of more than 100 losses would be matched in 2016 and was surpassed by one game as that record was 59–103.

Despite the Twins' new stadium, only 921,186 fans attended Twins games, the lowest total in the American League.

== Offseason ==
- October 23, 1981: Mike Kinnunen was traded by the Twins to the St. Louis Cardinals for Jeff Little.
- January 12, 1982: Kirby Puckett was drafted by the Twins in the 1st round (3rd pick) of the 1982 Major League Baseball draft.

== Regular season ==
The Hubert H. Humphrey Metrodome debuted with an April 3 exhibition game against the Philadelphia Phillies. Philadelphia's Pete Rose had the first unofficial Metrodome hit, and Minnesota's Kent Hrbek homered twice.

In the regular-season home opener, outfielder Dave Engle had the Twins' first hit and home run in the Metrodome. Third baseman Gary Gaetti homered twice and was thrown out at home trying to stretch a triple for an inside-the-park home run. The Seattle Mariners beat the Twins 11–7.

On May 29, for the only time in Twins history, a catcher nabbed four base stealers in a single game: Sal Butera threw out Ken Griffey, Graig Nettles, Bobby Murcer and Willie Randolph of the New York Yankees. Otherwise, May was not a good month as the Twins went 3-26, the worst major league month in baseball since the Philadelphia Athletics posted a 2–28 record in June of 1916. The Twins record slide of fourteen consecutive losses ended with a June 4 shutout win over Baltimore.

Only one Twins player made the All-Star Game in Montreal, first baseman Kent Hrbek.

On July 19, outfielder Tom Brunansky hit what will be the Twins only inside-the-park grand slam home run, ever. Jerry Augustine of the Milwaukee Brewers threw the pitch.

Pitcher Terry Felton – who'd gone 0–3 in 1980 – finished this season 0–13, and would not pitch in the majors again.

=== Offense ===
Kent Hrbek hit .301 with 23 HR and 92 RBI. Gary Ward hit .289 with 28 HR and 91 RBI. Gary Gaetti hit 25 HR and 84 RBI. Tom Brunansky hit 20 HR and 46 RBI.

Team Leaders
Statistic	Player	Quantity
HR	Gary Ward	28
RBI	Kent Hrbek	92
BA	Kent Hrbek	.301
Runs	Gary Ward	85

=== Pitching ===
Reliever Ron Davis had 22 saves.

Team Leaders
Statistic	Player	Quantity
ERA	Bobby Castillo	3.66
Wins	Bobby Castillo	13
Saves	Ron Davis	22
Strikeouts	Brad Havens	129

=== Season standings ===
AL West
Team	W	L	Pct.	GB	Home	Road
California Angels	93	69	.574	—	52‍–‍29	41‍–‍40
Kansas City Royals	90	72	.556	3	56‍–‍25	34‍–‍47
Chicago White Sox	87	75	.537	6	49‍–‍31	38‍–‍44
Seattle Mariners	76	86	.469	17	42‍–‍39	34‍–‍47
Oakland Athletics	68	94	.420	25	36‍–‍45	32‍–‍49
Texas Rangers	64	98	.395	29	38‍–‍43	26‍–‍55
Minnesota Twins	60	102	.370	33	37‍–‍44	23‍–‍58

=== Record vs. opponents ===
1982 American League record Sources:
Team	BAL	BOS	CAL	CWS	CLE	DET	KC	MIL	MIN	NYY	OAK	SEA	TEX	TOR
Baltimore	—	4–9	7–5	5–7	6–7	7–6	4–8	9–4–1	8–4	11–2	7–5	7–5	9–3	10–3
Boston	9–4	—	7–5	4–8	6–7	8–5	6–6	4–9	6–6	7–6	8–4	7–5	10–2	7–6
California	5–7	5–7	—	8–5	8–4	5–7	7–6	6–6	7–6	7–5	9–4	10–3	8–5	8–4
Chicago	7–5	8–4	5–8	—	6–6	9–3	3–10	3–9	7–6	8–4	9–4	6–7	8–5	8–4
Cleveland	7–6	7–6	4–8	6–6	—	6–7	2–10	7–6	8–4	4–9	4–8	9–3	7–5	7–6
Detroit	6–7	5–8	7–5	3–9	7–6	—	6–6	3–10	9–3	8–5	9–3	6–6	8–4	6–7
Kansas City	8–4	6–6	6–7	10–3	10–2	6–6	—	7–5	7–6	5–7	7–6	7–6	7–6	4–8
Milwaukee	4–9–1	9–4	6–6	9–3	6–7	10–3	5–7	—	7–5	8–5	7–5	8–4	7–5	9–4
Minnesota	4–8	6–6	6–7	6–7	4–8	3–9	6–7	5–7	—	2–10	3–10	5–8	5–8	5–7
New York	2–11	6–7	5–7	4–8	9–4	5–8	7–5	5–8	10–2	—	7–5	6–6	7–5	6–7
Oakland	5–7	4–8	4–9	4–9	8–4	3–9	6–7	5–7	10–3	5–7	—	6–7	5–8	3–9
Seattle	5–7	5–7	3–10	7–6	3–9	6–6	6–7	4–8	8–5	6–6	7–6	—	9–4	7–5
Texas	3–9	2–10	5–8	5–8	5–7	4–8	6–7	5–7	8–5	5–7	8–5	4–9	—	4–8
Toronto	3–10	6–7	4–8	4–8	6–7	7–6	8–4	4–9	7–5	7–6	9–3	5–7	8–4	—

=== Notable transactions ===
- March 26, 1982: Tim Corcoran was released by the Minnesota Twins.
- April 10, 1982: Roy Smalley III was traded by the Twins to the New York Yankees for Ron Davis, Greg Gagne and Paul Boris.
- May 12, 1982: Doug Corbett and Rob Wilfong were traded by the Twins to the California Angels for Tom Brunansky, Mike Walters, and $400,000.
- May 12, 1982: Butch Wynegar and Roger Erickson were traded by the Twins to the New York Yankees for Larry Milbourne, Pete Filson, John Pacella and cash.
- July 21, 1982: Houston Jiménez was purchased by the Twins from the Broncos de Reynosa.

=== Roster ===
1982 Minnesota Twins
Roster
Pitchers: 30 Fernando Arroyo; 30 Paul Boris; 37 Bobby Castillo; 34 Don Cooper; 23 Doug Corbett; 39 Ron Davis; 19 Roger Erickson; 18 Terry Felton; 23 Pete Filson; 27 Brad Havens; 31 Darrell Jackson; 36 Jeff Little; 33 Jack O'Connor; 19 John Pacella; 17 Pete Redfern; 16 Frank Viola; 28 Albert Williams	Catchers: 11 Sal Butera; 15 Tim Laudner; 1 Ray Smith; 16 Butch Wynegar; Infielders: 2 John Castino; 12 Lenny Faedo; 8 Gary Gaetti; 14 Kent Hrbek; 7 Larry Milbourne; 5 Roy Smalley; 38 Ron Washington; 7 Greg Wells; 7 Rob Wilfong	Outfielders: 24 Tom Brunansky; 4 Jim Eisenreich; 20 Dave Engle; 9 Mickey Hatcher; 10 Bobby Mitchell; 32 Gary Ward; Other batters: 25 Randy Bush; 22 Randy Johnson; 21 Jesús Vega	Manager: 42 Billy Gardner; Coaches}: 41 Karl Kuehl; 44 Jim Lemon; 46 Johnny Podres; 43 Rick Stelmaszek

== Player stats ==
=== Batting ===
==== Starters by position ====
Note: Pos = Position; G = Games played; AB = At bats; H = Hits; Avg. = Batting average; HR = Home runs; RBI = Runs batted in

Pos	Player	G	AB	H	Avg.	HR	RBI
C	Tim Laudner	93	306	78	.255	7	33
1B	Kent Hrbek	140	532	160	.301	23	92
2B	John Castino	117	410	99	.241	6	37
3B	Gary Gaetti	145	508	117	.230	25	84
SS	Lenny Faedo	90	255	62	.243	3	22
LF	Gary Ward	152	570	165	.289	28	91
CF	Bobby Mitchell	124	454	113	.249	2	28
RF	Tom Brunansky	127	463	126	.272	20	46
DH	Randy Johnson	89	234	58	.248	10	33

==== Other batters ====
Player	G	AB	H	Avg.	HR	RBI
Ron Washington	119	451	122	.271	5	39
Mickey Hatcher	84	277	69	.249	3	26
Jesús Vega	71	199	53	.266	5	29
Dave Engle	58	186	42	.226	4	16
Sal Butera	54	126	32	.254	0	8
Randy Bush	55	119	29	.244	4	13
Jim Eisenreich	34	99	30	.303	2	9
Larry Milbourne	29	98	23	.235	0	1
Butch Wynegar	24	86	18	.209	1	8
Rob Wilfong	25	81	13	.160	0	5
Greg Wells	15	54	11	.204	0	3
Ray Smith	9	23	5	.217	0	1
Roy Smalley	4	13	2	.154	0	0

=== Pitching ===
==== Starting pitchers ====
Player	G	IP	W	L	ERA	SO
Brad Havens	33	208.2	10	14	4.31	129
Albert Williams	26	153.2	9	7	4.22	61
Frank Viola	22	126.0	4	10	5.21	84
Jack O'Connor	23	126.0	8	9	4.29	56
Roger Erickson	7	40.2	4	3	4.87	12

==== Other pitchers ====
Player	G	IP	W	L	ERA	SO
Bobby Castillo	40	218.2	13	11	3.66	125
Terry Felton	48	117.1	0	13	4.99	92
Pete Redfern	27	94.1	5	11	6.58	40
Darrell Jackson	13	44.2	0	5	6.25	16
Pete Filson	5	12.1	0	2	8.76	10
Don Cooper	6	11.1	0	1	9.53	5

==== Relief pitchers ====
Player	G	W	L	SV	ERA	SO
Ron Davis	63	3	9	22	4.42	89
Jeff Little	33	2	0	0	4.21	26
Paul Boris	23	1	2	0	3.99	30
John Pacella	21	1	2	2	7.32	20
Doug Corbett	10	0	2	3	5.32	15
Fernando Arroyo	6	0	1	0	5.27	4

== Farm system ==
Level	Team	League	Manager
AAA	Toledo Mud Hens	International League	Cal Ermer
AA	Orlando Twins	Southern League	Tom Kelly
A	Visalia Oaks	California League	Phil Roof
A	Wisconsin Rapids Twins	Midwest League	Ken Staples
Rookie	Elizabethton Twins	Appalachian League	Fred Waters
