= 1982 Chicago White Sox season =

1982 Chicago White Sox
- League: American League
- Division: West
- Ballpark: Comiskey Park
- City: Chicago
- Owners: Jerry Reinsdorf
- General managers: Roland Hemond
- Managers: Tony La Russa
- Television: WFLD (Don Drysdale, Ken Harrelson); Sportsvision (Don Drysdale, Early Wynn, Ken Harrelson, Joe McConnell)
- Radio: WMAQ (AM) (Early Wynn, Joe McConnell)

The 1982 Chicago White Sox season was their 82nd season in the major leagues, and 83rd season overall. The White Sox finished at 87–75 (.537), third in the American League West, six games behind the division champion California Angels.

== Offseason ==
- December 11, 1981: Todd Cruz, Rod Allen, and Jim Essian were traded to the Seattle Mariners for Tom Paciorek.
- March 21, 1982: Ross Baumgarten and Butch Edge were traded to the Pittsburgh Pirates for Vance Law and Ernie Camacho.
- March 29, 1982: George Riley was released.

== Regular season ==
=== Season standings ===
AL West
Team	W	L	Pct.	GB	Home	Road
California Angels	93	69	.574	—	52‍–‍29	41‍–‍40
Kansas City Royals	90	72	.556	3	56‍–‍25	34‍–‍47
Chicago White Sox	87	75	.537	6	49‍–‍31	38‍–‍44
Seattle Mariners	76	86	.469	17	42‍–‍39	34‍–‍47
Oakland Athletics	68	94	.420	25	36‍–‍45	32‍–‍49
Texas Rangers	64	98	.395	29	38‍–‍43	26‍–‍55
Minnesota Twins	60	102	.370	33	37‍–‍44	23‍–‍58

=== Record vs. opponents ===
1982 American League record Sources:
Team	BAL	BOS	CAL	CWS	CLE	DET	KC	MIL	MIN	NYY	OAK	SEA	TEX	TOR
Baltimore	—	4–9	7–5	5–7	6–7	7–6	4–8	9–4–1	8–4	11–2	7–5	7–5	9–3	10–3
Boston	9–4	—	7–5	4–8	6–7	8–5	6–6	4–9	6–6	7–6	8–4	7–5	10–2	7–6
California	5–7	5–7	—	8–5	8–4	5–7	7–6	6–6	7–6	7–5	9–4	10–3	8–5	8–4
Chicago	7–5	8–4	5–8	—	6–6	9–3	3–10	3–9	7–6	8–4	9–4	6–7	8–5	8–4
Cleveland	7–6	7–6	4–8	6–6	—	6–7	2–10	7–6	8–4	4–9	4–8	9–3	7–5	7–6
Detroit	6–7	5–8	7–5	3–9	7–6	—	6–6	3–10	9–3	8–5	9–3	6–6	8–4	6–7
Kansas City	8–4	6–6	6–7	10–3	10–2	6–6	—	7–5	7–6	5–7	7–6	7–6	7–6	4–8
Milwaukee	4–9–1	9–4	6–6	9–3	6–7	10–3	5–7	—	7–5	8–5	7–5	8–4	7–5	9–4
Minnesota	4–8	6–6	6–7	6–7	4–8	3–9	6–7	5–7	—	2–10	3–10	5–8	5–8	5–7
New York	2–11	6–7	5–7	4–8	9–4	5–8	7–5	5–8	10–2	—	7–5	6–6	7–5	6–7
Oakland	5–7	4–8	4–9	4–9	8–4	3–9	6–7	5–7	10–3	5–7	—	6–7	5–8	3–9
Seattle	5–7	5–7	3–10	7–6	3–9	6–6	6–7	4–8	8–5	6–6	7–6	—	9–4	7–5
Texas	3–9	2–10	5–8	5–8	5–7	4–8	6–7	5–7	8–5	5–7	8–5	4–9	—	4–8
Toronto	3–10	6–7	4–8	4–8	6–7	7–6	8–4	4–9	7–5	7–6	9–3	5–7	8–4	—

=== Opening Day lineup ===
- Ron LeFlore, CF
- Tony Bernazard, 2B
- Steve Kemp, LF
- Greg Luzinski, DH
- Tom Paciorek, 1B
- Carlton Fisk, C
- Harold Baines, RF
- Jim Morrison, 3B
- Bill Almon, SS
- Jerry Koosman, P

=== Notable transactions ===
- April 2: Wayne Nordhagen was traded to the Toronto Blue Jays for Aurelio Rodríguez.
- June 7: Kenny Williams was selected in the third round of the 1982 Major League Baseball draft.
- August 21: Sparky Lyle was purchased from the Philadelphia Phillies.

=== Roster ===
1982 Chicago White Sox
Roster
Pitchers: 50 Juan Agosto; 52 Rich Barnes; 30 Salome Barojas; 46 Warren Brusstar; 40 Britt Burns; 49 Richard Dotson; 23 Chico Escárrega; 45 Kevin Hickey; 31 LaMarr Hoyt; 67 Jim Kern; 36 Jerry Koosman; 53 Dennis Lamp; 28 Sparky Lyle; 54 Jim Siwy; 27 Eddie Solomon; 33 Steve Trout	Catchers: 72 Carlton Fisk; 16 Marv Foley; 7 Marc Hill; Infielders: 34 Bill Almon; 14 Tony Bernazard; 12 Steve Dillard; 27 Lorenzo Gray; 5 Vance Law; 1 Jay Loviglio; 12 Jim Morrison; 23 Chris Nyman; 44 Tom Paciorek; 20 Aurelio Rodríguez; 25 Mike Squires	Outfielders: 3 Harold Baines; 17 Jerry Hairston; 22 Steve Kemp; 42 Ron Kittle; 47 Rusty Kuntz; 11 Rudy Law; 8 Ron LeFlore; Other batters: 19 Greg Luzinski; 29 Greg Walker	Manager: 10 Tony La Russa; Coaches: 42 Loren Babe; 15 Art Kusnyer; 6 Charley Lau; 28 Jim Leyland (third base); 38 Dave Nelson; 37 Ron Schueler

== Player stats ==
=== Batting ===
Note: G = Games played; AB = At bats; R = Runs scored; H = Hits; 2B = Doubles; 3B = Triples; HR = Home runs; RBI = Runs batted in; BB = Base on balls; SO = Strikeouts; AVG = Batting average; SB = Stolen bases

Player	G	AB	R	H	2B	3B	HR	RBI	BB	SO	AVG	SB
Bill Almon, SS	111	308	40	79	10	4	4	26	25	49	.256	10
Harold Baines, RF	161	608	89	165	29	8	25	105	49	95	.271	10
Tony Bernazard, 2B	137	540	90	138	25	9	11	56	67	88	.256	11
Steve Dillard, 2B	16	41	1	7	3	1	0	5	1	5	.171	0
Carlton Fisk, C	135	476	66	127	17	3	14	65	46	60	.267	17
Marv Foley, C	27	36	1	4	0	0	0	1	6	4	.111	0
Lorenzo Gray, 3B	17	28	4	8	1	0	0	0	2	4	.286	1
Jerry Hairston, OF	85	90	11	21	5	0	5	18	9	15	.233	0
Marc Hill, C	53	88	9	23	2	0	3	13	6	13	.261	0
Steve Kemp, LF	160	580	91	166	23	1	19	98	89	83	.286	7
Ron Kittle, RF	20	29	3	7	2	0	1	7	3	12	.241	0
Rusty Kuntz, CF	21	26	4	5	1	0	0	3	2	8	.192	0
Rudy Law, CF	121	336	55	107	15	8	3	32	23	41	.318	36
Vance Law, SS, 3B, 2B	114	359	40	101	20	1	5	54	26	46	.281	4
Ron LeFlore, CF	91	334	58	96	15	4	4	25	22	91	.287	28
Jay Loviglio, 2B	15	31	5	6	0	0	0	2	1	4	.194	2
Greg Luzinski, DH	159	583	87	170	37	1	18	102	89	120	.292	1
Jim Morrison, 3B	51	166	17	37	7	3	7	19	13	15	.223	0
Chris Nyman, 1B	28	65	6	16	1	0	0	2	3	9	.246	3
Tom Paciorek, 1B, LF	104	382	49	119	27	4	11	55	24	53	.312	3
Aurelio Rodriguez, 3B	118	257	24	62	15	1	3	31	11	35	.241	0
Mike Squires, 1B	116	195	33	52	9	3	1	21	14	13	.267	3
Greg Walker, DH	11	17	3	7	2	1	2	7	2	3	.412	0
Team totals	162	5575	786	1523	266	52	136	747	533	866	.273	136

=== Pitching ===
= Indicates league leader

Note: W = Wins; L = Losses; ERA = Earned run average; G = Games pitched; GS = Games started; SV = Saves; IP = Innings pitched; H = Hits allowed; R = Runs allowed; ER = Earned runs allowed; HR = Home runs allowed; BB = Walks allowed; K = Strikeouts

Player	W	L	ERA	G	GS	SV	IP	H	R	ER	HR	BB	K
Juan Agosto	0	0	18.00	1	0	0	2.0	7	4	4	0	0	1
Rich Barnes	0	2	4.76	6	2	1	17.0	21	15	9	1	4	6
Salome Barojas	6	6	3.54	61	0	21	106.2	96	43	42	9	52	56
Warren Brusstar	2	0	3.44	10	0	0	18.1	19	7	7	2	3	8
Britt Burns	13	5	4.04	28	28	0	169.1	168	89	76	12	68	116
Richard Dotson	11	15	3.84	34	31	0	196.2	219	97	84	19	77	109
Chico Escárrega	1	3	3.67	38	2	1	73.2	73	33	30	3	18	33
Kevin Hickey	4	4	3.00	60	0	6	78.0	73	32	26	4	36	38
LaMarr Hoyt	19	15	3.53	39	32	0	239.2	248	104	94	17	51	124
Jim Kern	2	1	5.14	13	1	3	28.0	20	16	16	3	12	23
Jerry Koosman	11	7	3.84	42	19	3	173.1	194	81	74	9	41	88
Dennis Lamp	11	8	3.99	44	27	5	189.2	206	96	84	9	62	78
Sparky Lyle	0	0	3.00	11	0	1	12.0	11	4	4	0	7	6
Jim Siwy	0	0	10.29	2	1	0	7.0	10	8	8	1	5	3
Eddie Solomon	1	0	3.68	6	0	0	7.1	7	5	3	1	2	2
Steve Trout	6	9	4.26	25	19	0	120.1	130	76	57	9	52	62
Team totals	87	75	3.87	162	162	41	1439.0	1502	710	618	99	460	753

== Farm system ==
Level	Team	League	Manager
AAA	Edmonton Trappers	Pacific Coast League	Gordon Lund
AA	Glens Falls White Sox	Eastern League	Jim Mahoney
A	Appleton Foxes	Midwest League	Adrian Garrett
A-Short Season	Niagara Falls Sox	New York–Penn League	Fred Nelson
Rookie	GCL White Sox	Gulf Coast League	John Boles

LEAGUE CHAMPIONS: Appleton, Niagara Falls
