= 1981 World Series =

78th edition of Major League Baseball's championship series

Team (Wins)	Managers	Season
Los Angeles Dodgers (4)	Tommy Lasorda	36–21, .632, GA: 1/2 (1st half); 27–26, .509, GB: 6 (2nd half)
New York Yankees (2)	Bob Lemon	34–22, .607, GA: 2 (1st half); 25–26, .490, GB: 5 (2nd half)
- Dates: October 20–28
- Venue(s): Yankee Stadium (New York); Dodger Stadium (Los Angeles)
- MVP: Ron Cey, Pedro Guerrero, and Steve Yeager (Los Angeles)
- Umpires: Larry Barnett (AL), Nick Colosi (NL), Terry Cooney (AL), Doug Harvey (NL), Rich Garcia (AL), Dick Stello (NL)
- Hall of Famers: Umpire: Doug Harvey; Dodgers: Tommy Lasorda (manager). Yankees: Goose Gossage; Reggie Jackson; Bob Lemon (manager); Dave Winfield

Broadcast
- Television: ABC; KTTV (LAD); WPIX (NYY)
- TV announcers: ABC: Keith Jackson (in New York); Al Michaels (in Los Angeles); Howard Cosell and Jim Palmer; KTTV: Jerry Doggett and Ross Porter; WPIX: Phil Rizzuto, Frank Messer and Bill White
- Radio: CBS; KABC (LAD); WABC (NYY)
- Radio announcers: CBS: Vin Scully and Sparky Anderson; KABC: Jerry Doggett and Ross Porter; WABC: Phil Rizzuto, Frank Messer, Bill White and Fran Healy
- ALCS: New York Yankees over Oakland Athletics (3–0)
- NLCS: Los Angeles Dodgers over Montreal Expos (3–2)

The 1981 World Series was the championship series of Major League Baseball's (MLB) 1981 season. The 78th edition of the World Series, it was a best-of-seven playoff played between the American League (AL) champion New York Yankees and the National League (NL) champion Los Angeles Dodgers. It marked their third Series meeting in five years and was their 11th overall Series meeting. The Dodgers won the Series in six games, as the Yankees had done in the teams' prior two Series meetings, in 1977 and 1978. This was the Dodgers' first title since 1965, their first victory over the Yankees since 1963, and third overall Series win over the Yankees.

This is the most recent World Series that a team won after losing the first two games on the road, the next previous instance being the Yankees' victory over the Dodgers in the 1978 World Series. This was the last meeting between teams from New York City and Los Angeles for a major professional sports championship until the Los Angeles Kings and New York Rangers reached the NHL's 2014 Stanley Cup Final, as well as the last meeting between the Dodgers and the Yankees in the World Series until 2024. The Dodgers-Yankees matchup has been the most frequent pairing in World Series history.

== Background ==
Due to the players' strike, which ran from June 12 to August 8, the 1981 season was split into two halves, with the first-place teams from each half in each division (or a wild card team if the same club won both halves, although this did not occur in any division) meeting in the best-of-five League Division Series (this division series was a one-off occasion; it was not until 1994 that the Division Series would be implemented on a permanent basis). The four survivors would then move on to the two best-of-five League Championship Series. The expanded playoffs led to Game 1 of the World Series being pushed back to October 20, the latest starting date for a Fall Classic up to that time.

The split-season decision was not a popular one, both among teams and their fans. The arrangement resulted in teams with the best overall record in either their division or league that year being left out of the postseason, in particular the Cincinnati Reds, who had the best overall record in the majors, and the St. Louis Cardinals, who finished with the best overall record in the NL East. Though the teams with the best record in the American League East and West did win their divisions, the Yankees finished 3rd overall in the AL East while the Kansas City Royals finished 4th overall with a losing 50–53 record.

This was the seventh meeting between teams from Los Angeles and New York City for a major professional sports championship. This previously occurred in three World Series (1963, 1977, 1978) and three NBA Finals (1970, 1972, 1973), and would be the last until the 2014 Stanley Cup Final.

=== Los Angeles Dodgers ===
The Dodgers got to the Series with help from Mexican-born rookie phenom Fernando Valenzuela, who won his first eight games including five by shutout. Valenzuela would pitch eight shutouts in all and win both the National League's Rookie of the Year and Cy Young awards; his sudden rise out of seemingly nowhere was nicknamed "Fernandomania". Joining Valenzuela in the rotation were veterans Burt Hooton (11–6, 2.28) and Jerry Reuss (10–4, 2.30). The core of the position players remained intact with perennial all-star Steve Garvey at first, Davey Lopes at second, Bill Russell at shortstop, and team leader in home runs with 13, Ron Cey at third. Budding star, Pedro Guerrero, would move to the outfield becoming a regular starter for the first time in his career, in place of the aging and often injured Reggie Smith.

The Dodgers led the NL West prior to the strike, and clinched a postseason berth to the expanded postseason. In the NLDS, the Dodgers defeated the Houston Astros in five games. In the NLCS, the Dodgers narrowly defeated the Montreal Expos, also in five games to return to the World Series for the fourth time in seven seasons.

Manager Tommy Lasorda was looking for his first World Series win in his fifth full season with the Dodgers after losing to the Yankees in 1977 and 1978.

=== New York Yankees ===
The Yankees, managed by Bob Lemon (in his second stint, having replaced Gene Michael), had a losing second-half (25–26) but won the first-half (34–22) to qualify for the playoffs. Ace starter Ron Guidry won 11 games against while rookie Dave Righetti emerged as an important starter, winning eight games with a 2.05 ERA. Righetti would win the American League's Rookie of the Year award. Reliever Goose Gossage recorded 20 saves with an 0.77 ERA, striking out 48 in 47 innings.

Dave Winfield was signed as a free agent in the off-season, joined another all-star, Reggie Jackson, in the outfield. Winfield led the Yankees with 25 doubles and 68 RBIs. Winfield's huge contract (US$21 million over 10 years), was added to an already strong lineup.

The Yankees returned to the postseason as they led the American League East in the season's first half. In the ALDS, the Yankees took on the Milwaukee Brewers, who made their postseason debut, and defeated them in five games to return to the ALCS for the fifth time in the past six seasons. In the ALCS, the Yankees swept the Oakland Athletics to return to the World Series for the fourth time in six seasons.

== Summary ==
NL Los Angeles Dodgers (4) vs. AL New York Yankees (2)

Game	Date	Score	Location	Time	Attendance
1	October 20	Los Angeles Dodgers – 3, New York Yankees – 5	Yankee Stadium	2:32	56,470
2	October 21	Los Angeles Dodgers – 0, New York Yankees – 3	Yankee Stadium	2:29	56,505
3	October 23	New York Yankees – 4, Los Angeles Dodgers – 5	Dodger Stadium	3:04	56,236
4	October 24	New York Yankees – 7, Los Angeles Dodgers – 8	Dodger Stadium	3:32	56,242
5	October 25	New York Yankees – 1, Los Angeles Dodgers – 2	Dodger Stadium	2:19	56,115
6	October 28†	Los Angeles Dodgers – 9, New York Yankees – 2	Yankee Stadium	3:09	56,513

†: postponed from October 27 due to rain

== Matchups ==
=== Game 1 ===
October 20, 1981 8:30 pm (ET) at Yankee Stadium in Bronx, New York 55 °F (13 °C), clear
Team	1	2	3	4	5	6	7	8	9	R	H	E
Los Angeles	0	0	0	0	1	0	0	2	0	3	5	0
New York	3	0	1	1	0	0	0	0	X	5	6	0
WP: Ron Guidry (1–0) LP: Jerry Reuss (0–1) Sv: Goose Gossage (1); Home runs: LAD: Steve Yeager (1); NYY: Bob Watson (1)

The Series commenced on October 20, making it the latest start of the Series, breaking the previous record by three days (1910 World Series, October 17). Bob Watson smashed a three-run homer off Jerry Reuss in the first to get the Yankees started. Lou Piniella chased Reuss with an RBI single in the third, and Dodger reliever Bobby Castillo walked four batters in the fourth (the last being a walk to Dave Winfield that forced home a run) to give New York a 5–0 lead. Ron Guidry held the Dodgers to four hits and a run (on a Steve Yeager homer) through seven innings. Ron Davis gave up two in the eighth by walking Derrel Thomas and Davey Lopes to lead off. After the walks, Davis was relieved by closer Goose Gossage who gave up a pinch-hit RBI single to Jay Johnstone and a sacrifice fly by Dusty Baker to score Thomas and Lopes, but Gossage closed out the win in the ninth. Yankee third baseman Graig Nettles suffered a hairline fracture of his left thumb when he made a diving stop. The injury caused him to miss Games 3, 4, and 5, but he played in Games 2 and 6.

=== Game 2 ===
October 21, 1981 8:20 pm (ET) at Yankee Stadium in Bronx, New York 58 °F (14 °C), clear
Team	1	2	3	4	5	6	7	8	9	R	H	E
Los Angeles	0	0	0	0	0	0	0	0	0	0	4	2
New York	0	0	0	0	1	0	0	2	X	3	6	1
WP: Tommy John (1–0) LP: Burt Hooton (0–1) Sv: Goose Gossage (2)

Former teammates Burt Hooton and Tommy John were locked in a scoreless duel until the fifth, when Larry Milbourne doubled in Willie Randolph for the only run John would really need. The Yankees pushed across two more in the eighth off Steve Howe on a RBI single by Bob Watson and a sacrifice fly by Randolph. John pitched seven shutout innings, and Goose Gossage closed for his second save in two games. Shortly after this game concluded, a small fire broke out in the interview room of Yankee Stadium (that began in a storage locker area of the room); the blaze was contained an hour later, with no injuries occurring; damage to the room was light.

=== Game 3 ===
October 23, 1981 5:30 pm (PT) at Dodger Stadium in Los Angeles, California 61 °F (16 °C), Mostly cloudy
Team	1	2	3	4	5	6	7	8	9	R	H	E
New York	0	2	2	0	0	0	0	0	0	4	9	0
Los Angeles	3	0	0	0	2	0	0	0	X	5	11	1
WP: Fernando Valenzuela (1–0) LP: George Frazier (0–1); Home runs: NYY: Bob Watson (2), Rick Cerone (1); LAD: Ron Cey (1)

Prior to this game, Yankee manager Bob Lemon sat Reggie Jackson. Jackson injured himself running the bases in Game 2 of the ALCS and missed the first two games of the World Series, but was medically cleared to play Game 3. Jackson was not even allowed to pinch-hit. Lemon said he was resting Jackson as a precaution and because the Dodgers were starting a left hand pitcher. However, speculation was that Yankees' owner George Steinbrenner felt the Yankees would win the next two games of the series easily without Jackson, so he ordered Lemon to keep him out of this game. After the series was over, Steinbrenner would let Jackson walk as a free agent since his initial five-year contract was up and Steinbrenner had signed Dave Winfield as essentially Jackson's replacement.

The starters of game 3 were AL Rookie of the Year Dave Righetti for the Yankees and NL Rookie of the Year (and Cy Young Award winner) Fernando Valenzuela. Valenzuela lasted the entire game despite allowing nine hits, four runs, walking seven, and constantly pitching out of trouble. He walked two Yankee batters in the first, but pitched out of it. Righetti allowed a leadoff double to Davey Lopes and a single to Bill Russell. Ron Cey then hit a three-run homer off Righetti. Righetti would only last two innings before being relieved.

The Yankees cut it to 3–2 in the second on a Bob Watson homer and a Larry Milbourne RBI single. Valenzuela stranded two runners in this inning. Rick Cerone gave the Yanks a 4–3 lead in the third with a two-run homer, but the Yankees left two on once again. Watson led off the fifth with a double, but no one scored as Valenzuela pitched out of it again. In both the third and fifth innings, the Dodgers were helped by the Yankees' being unable to use a designated hitter (since it was used in last season's Series). In both innings, Valenzuela issued two-out intentional walks to number 8 hitter Larry Milbourne in order to pitch to Dave Righetti and George Frazier. Valenzuela struck out the pitchers both times.

The Dodgers gave Valenzuela the lead back in the bottom of the fifth off Frazier when Pedro Guerrero doubled in Steve Garvey to tie it, and Cey scored on a double play grounder by Mike Scioscia. With a lead and the Dodger Stadium crowd behind him, Valenzuela appeared to finally settle down. After pinch hitting, Valenzuela's regular catcher Mike Scioscia took over behind the plate. This seemed to have a calming effect on the rookie, as Scioscia knew Spanish and was better able to talk with Valenzuela than Steve Yeager.

The Yankees mounted their final threat in the eighth when Aurelio Rodríguez and Milbourne led off with back-to-back singles. Pinch-hitter Bobby Murcer attempted a sacrifice bunt, but popped it foul. Cey dove and caught it, then doubled Milbourne off first.

Valenzuela, despite giving up 9 hits (including 2 homers), walking 7, and throwing 149 pitches in facing 40 batters, went the distance to give the Dodgers their first win of the series.

=== Game 4 ===
October 24, 1981 1:25 pm (PT) at Dodger Stadium in Los Angeles, California 66 °F (19 °C), partly cloudy
Team	1	2	3	4	5	6	7	8	9	R	H	E
New York	2	1	1	0	0	2	0	1	0	7	13	1
Los Angeles	0	0	2	0	1	3	2	0	X	8	14	2
WP: Steve Howe (1–0) LP: George Frazier (0–2); Home runs: NYY: Willie Randolph (1), Reggie Jackson (1); LAD: Jay Johnstone (1)

After being held out of game 3, Reggie Jackson was back in the starting lineup for this game. The Yankees batters had early success against Dodgers pitcher Bob Welch, who faced four batters without recording an out before being relieved by Dave Goltz. Willie Randolph led the game off with a triple and scored on a Larry Milbourne double. Dave Winfield walked and Jackson singled before Goltz gave up a sacrifice fly to Bob Watson. Randolph smashed a two-out solo home run in the second and Rick Cerone batted in a run with a single in the third for a 4–0 Yankee lead.

Yankee starter Rick Reuschel then had problems of his own. He allowed an RBI single to Davey Lopes and an RBI groundout to Ron Cey in the third before leaving in favor of Rudy May. May gave up a double to Steve Garvey and an RBI single to Cey in the fifth, but the Yankees countered with two in the sixth on RBI singles by Oscar Gamble and Watson off Tom Niedenfuer. Watson's hit was a sinking liner that Dusty Baker attempted to catch, but it was ruled a trap.

With a 6–3 lead, the Yankees turned the pitching over to their relief combination of Ron Davis and Goose Gossage. Davis had troubles in the sixth. He issued a one-out walk to Mike Scioscia and gave up a pinch-hit homer to Jay Johnstone to make the score 6–5. Then, Lopes lifted a fly ball to right that Jackson lost in the sun and dropped for an error. Lopes reached second and stole third with no throw by catcher Cerone three pitches later. Davis then gave up a game-tying single to Bill Russell.

In the seventh, Dusty Baker led off with an infield hit off George Frazier and went to third on a Rick Monday liner that got past center fielder Bobby Brown when he tried to make a shoestring catch. Monday reached second on the double. Pedro Guerrero was then walked intentionally. Yankee manager Bob Lemon then brought starting pitcher Tommy John out of the bullpen instead of Gossage. Steve Yeager, hitting for Scioscia, promptly gave the Dodgers the lead when he drove home Baker with a sacrifice fly and moved Monday to third. Lopes followed with an infield single that drove Monday home for an 8–6 lead. John managed to strand Guerrero in scoring position to end the seventh and pitched the last two innings, but closer Gossage never got in the game.

Jackson brought the Yankees closer with a home run in the eighth off lefty Steve Howe, capping a 3-for-3 day. The home run was Jackson's 10th and final in World Series play, tying Lou Gehrig. But Howe was able to close out the win, despite Willie Randolph pinning Dodger centerfielder Derrell Thomas against the centerfield wall with a deep fly ball. The series was now tied 2–2.

According to Johnstone's book Temporary Insanity (1985), Steinbrenner confronted Davis in the Yankees' locker room after the game and demanded to know, "Why did you throw Johnstone a fastball?"

=== Game 5 ===
October 25, 1981 1:45 pm (PT) at Dodger Stadium in Los Angeles, California 68 °F (20 °C), sunny
Team	1	2	3	4	5	6	7	8	9	R	H	E
New York	0	1	0	0	0	0	0	0	0	1	5	0
Los Angeles	0	0	0	0	0	0	2	0	X	2	4	3
WP: Jerry Reuss (1–1) LP: Ron Guidry (1–1); Home runs: NYY: None; LAD: Pedro Guerrero (1), Steve Yeager (2)

Needing a win to stop the Dodgers' momentum in this series, the Yankees trotted out their ace, Ron Guidry. Guidry was sharp through six innings, holding the Dodgers to two singles. Reggie Jackson, continuing his torrid hitting, helped provide Guidry a lead by doubling to left in the second off Jerry Reuss, moving to third on a Davey Lopes error, and scoring on a Lou Piniella infield single.

The game then took a turn in the seventh inning. After fanning Dusty Baker, Guidry surrendered back-to-back solo home runs to Pedro Guerrero and Steve Yeager. After he had struck out, Baker suggested to Yeager and Guerrero that they move up in the batter's box to take away Guidry's late breaking slider. Both home runs were hit on sliders almost to the same place in left-center. Meanwhile, Reuss was as effective as Guidry, holding the Yanks to five hits and the lone run and going the distance.

A tense moment occurred in the eighth when Goose Gossage beaned Ron Cey. Cey had to be helped off the field with a concussion, but was cleared to play Game 6 after it was delayed one day by rain.

=== Game 6 ===
October 28, 1981 8:20 pm (ET) at Yankee Stadium in Bronx, New York 53 °F (12 °C), partly cloudy
Team	1	2	3	4	5	6	7	8	9	R	H	E
Los Angeles	0	0	0	1	3	4	0	1	0	9	13	1
New York	0	0	1	0	0	1	0	0	0	2	7	2
WP: Burt Hooton (1–1) LP: George Frazier (0–3) Sv: Steve Howe (1); Home runs: LAD: Pedro Guerrero (2); NYY: Willie Randolph (2)

This was the latest-ending World Series by calendar date up to that time (surpassing the 1911 World Series, which ended on October 26). Originally scheduled for Tuesday, October 27, Game 6 was postponed a day by rain. This allowed Bob Lemon to start Tommy John opposite Dodger starter Burt Hooton, and also allowed Ron Cey to be in the Dodger lineup. Willie Randolph provided John an early lead with a solo homer in the third. The Dodgers tied it in the fourth on an RBI single by Game 5 hero Steve Yeager.

In the bottom of the fourth, Yankee manager Bob Lemon made a controversial decision. Graig Nettles led off the inning with a double. After Hooton retired the next two batters, he intentionally walked Larry Milbourne to face John (there was no designated hitter in this series). Lemon pinch-hit for his starting pitcher in the fourth inning of a 1–1 game. Pinch-hitter Bobby Murcer flied out to end the inning. In his 1991 autobiography T.J.: My 26 Years in Baseball, John revealed that before the game, Lemon and team owner George Steinbrenner settled on the following strategy: get the lead early and then protect it with the bullpen (despite the bullpen's collapses earlier in the series). As ABC cameras showed during the broadcast, John paced the Yankee dugout in disbelief after being pulled.

In the fifth, George Frazier, who relieved John, gave up an RBI single to Ron Cey and a two-run triple to Pedro Guerrero. Frazier would take the loss and become the first pitcher to lose three games in a best-of-seven World Series and second pitcher to lose three times in any World Series (the first being Lefty Williams, a member of the Chicago White Sox in the best-of-nine 1919 World Series).

New York's bullpen further collapsed in the sixth. Ron Davis issued one-out walks to pitcher Hooton and Davey Lopes. Bill Russell singled to short left field, and Hooton unexpectedly rounded third and headed home. Dave Winfield stumbled on the wet grass, fell forward, and uncorked an errant throw. Hooton scored standing, after which Lemon pulled Davis in favor of Rick Reuschel. On Reuschel's second pitch, Lopes and Russell pulled a double steal. Reuschel walked Steve Garvey intentionally and gave up an RBI force-out to pinch-hitter Derrel Thomas. After Dusty Baker reached on an error by Nettles, loading the bases again, Guerrero singled in two more runs. The Yankees would score in the bottom of the sixth on a pinch-hit RBI single by Lou Piniella. Guerrero would cap a five-RBI night, and the Dodgers' World Series win, by blasting a solo home run in the eighth off Yankee reliever Rudy May. Burt Hooton would pitch 5 1/3 innings and get the win. Steve Howe replaced him and earned the save.

Winfield's throw typified his struggles in this, his first World Series. At the plate, he went 1-for-22 with one RBI. After the series, Steinbrenner issued a public apology to the City of New York for his team's performance, while at the same time assuring the fans that plans to put the team together for 1982 would begin immediately. The Yankee owner was criticized by players and press alike for doing so, as many people felt losing a World Series was not something for which a team needed to apologize.

For the first time, there were co-MVPs in a World Series: Cey (.350 avg., 7-for-20, HR, 6 RBIs), Yeager (.286 avg., 4-for-14, 2 HR's), and Guerrero (.333 avg, 7-for-21, 2 HR's, 7 RBIs) shared the award.

== Composite box ==
1981 World Series (4–2): Los Angeles Dodgers (N.L.) over New York Yankees (A.L.)

Team	1	2	3	4	5	6	7	8	9	R	H	E
Los Angeles Dodgers	3	0	2	1	7	7	4	3	0	27	51	9
New York Yankees	5	4	5	1	1	3	0	3	0	22	46	4
Total attendance: 338,081 Average attendance: 56,347; Winning player's share: $38,119 Losing player's share: $28,845

== Series batting stats ==
=== Los Angeles Dodgers ===
                                          SERIES STATS                   |      REGULAR SEASON       
 Player              G  AB  R  H 2B 3B HR RBI BB SO  BA    OBP   SLG  SB |  AB  H  HR  BA     OPS  SB
+-------------------+-+---+--+--+--+--+--+---+--+--+-----+-----+-----+---+----+---+--+-----+-----+---+
 Dusty Baker         6  24  3  4  0  0  0   1  1  6  .167  .192  .167  0 | 400 128  9  .320  .808  10
 Bobby Castillo      1   0  0  0  0  0  0   0  0  0                    0 |   9   4  0  .444 1.111   0
 Ron Cey             6  20  3  7  0  0  1   6  3  3  .350  .458  .500  0 | 312  90 13  .288  .846   0
*Terry Forster       2   0  0  0  0  0  0   0  0  0                    0 |   2   0  0  .000  .000   0
 Steve Garvey        6  24  3 10  1  0  0   0  2  5  .417  .462  .458  0 | 431 122 10  .283  .732   3
 Dave Goltz          2   0  0  0  0  0  0   0  0  0                    0 |  17   1  0  .059  .217   0
 Pedro Guerrero      6  21  2  7  1  1  2   7  2  6  .333  .417  .762  0 | 347 104 12  .300  .829   5
 Burt Hooton         2   4  1  0  0  0  0   0  1  3  .000  .200  .000  0 |  42   8  0  .190  .523   0
*Steve Howe          3   2  0  0  0  0  0   0  0  2  .000  .000  .000  0 |   1   0  0  .000  .500   0
*Jay Johnstone       3   3  1  2  0  0  1   3  0  0  .667  .667  1.66  0 |  83  17  3  .205  .616   0
*Ken Landreaux       5   6  1  1  1  0  0   0  0  2  .167  .167  .333  1 | 390  98  7  .251  .664  18
 Davey Lopes         6  22  6  5  1  0  0   2  4  3  .227  .346  .273  4 | 214  44  5  .206  .574  20
*Rick Monday         5  13  1  3  1  0  0   0  3  6  .231  .375  .308  0 | 130  41 11  .315 1.031   1
 Tom Niedenfuer      2   0  0  0  0  0  0   0  0  0                    0 |   0   0  0               0
*Jerry Reuss         2   3  0  0  0  0  0   0  1  2  .000  .250  .000  0 |  51  10  0  .196  .392   0
 Bill Russell        6  25  1  6  0  0  0   2  0  1  .240  .240  .240  1 | 262  61  0  .233  .567   2
 Steve Sax           2   1  0  0  0  0  0   0  0  0  .000  .000  .000  0 | 119  33  2  .277  .662   5
*Mike Scioscia       3   4  1  1  0  0  0   0  1  0  .250  .400  .250  0 | 290  80  2  .276  .685   0
#Reggie Smith        2   2  0  1  0  0  0   0  0  1  .500  .500  .500  0 |  35   7  1  .200  .632   0
 Dave Stewart        2   0  0  0  0  0  0   0  0  0                    0 |   5   2  0  .400 1.300   0
#Derrel Thomas       5   7  2  0  0  0  0   1  1  2  .000  .125  .000  0 | 218  54  4  .248  .644   7
*Fernando Valenzuela 1   3  0  0  0  0  0   0  1  0  .000  .250  .000  0 |  64  16  0  .250  .543   0
 Bob Welch           1   0  0  0  0  0  0   0  0  0                    0 |  45  10  0  .222  .506   0
 Steve Yeager        6  14  2  4  1  0  2   4  0  2  .286  .267  .786  0 |  86  18  3  .209  .598   0
+-------------------+-+---+--+--+--+--+--+---+--+--+-----+-----+-----+---+----+---+--+-----+-----+---+
 Total               6 198 27 51  6  1  6  26 20 44  .258  .329  .389  6 |         82  .262  .696  73
 
   * – bats left-handed, # – switch hits, ? – unknown, else – bats right-handed
   A + before season totals indicates the player was with multiple teams this year.

=== New York Yankees ===
                                          SERIES STATS                   |      REGULAR SEASON       
 Player              G  AB  R  H 2B 3B HR RBI BB SO  BA    OBP   SLG  SB |  AB  H  HR  BA     OPS  SB
+-------------------+-+---+--+--+--+--+--+---+--+--+-----+-----+-----+---+----+---+--+-----+-----+---+
#Bobby Brown         4   1  1  0  0  0  0   0  0  1  .000  .000  .000  0 |  62  14  0  .226  .521   4
 Rick Cerone         6  21  2  4  1  0  1   3  4  2  .190  .320  .381  0 | 234  57  2  .244  .618   0
 Ron Davis           4   0  0  0  0  0  0   0  0  0                    0 |   0   0  0               0
 Barry Foote         1   1  0  0  0  0  0   0  0  1  .000  .000  .000  0 |+147  26  6  .177  .559   0
 George Frazier      3   2  0  0  0  0  0   0  0  1  .000  .000  .000  0 |   0   0  0               0
*Oscar Gamble        3   6  1  2  0  0  0   1  1  0  .333  .429  .333  0 | 189  45 10  .238  .796   0
 Rich Gossage        3   1  0  0  0  0  0   0  0  1  .000  .000  .000  0 |   0   0  0               0
*Ron Guidry          2   5  0  0  0  0  0   0  0  3  .000  .000  .000  0 |   0   0  0               0
*Reggie Jackson      3  12  3  4  1  0  1   1  2  3  .333  .429  .667  0 | 334  79 15  .237  .758   0
 Tommy John          3   2  0  0  0  0  0   0  0  0  .000  .000  .000  0 |   0   0  0               0
*Dave LaRoche        1   0  0  0  0  0  0   0  0  0                    0 |   0   0  0               0
*Rudy May            3   1  0  0  0  0  0   0  0  0  .000  .000  .000  0 |   0   0  0               0
#Larry Milbourne     6  20  2  5  2  0  0   3  4  0  .250  .375  .350  0 | 163  51  1  .313  .749   2
#Jerry Mumphrey      5  15  2  3  0  0  0   0  3  2  .200  .333  .200  1 | 319  98  6  .307  .783  14
*Bobby Murcer        4   3  0  0  0  0  0   0  0  0  .000  .000  .000  0 | 117  31  6  .265  .801   0
*Graig Nettles       3  10  1  4  1  0  0   0  1  1  .400  .455  .500  0 | 349  85 15  .244  .731   0
 Lou Piniella        6  16  2  7  1  0  0   3  0  1  .438  .438  .500  1 | 159  44  5  .277  .759   0
 Willie Randolph     6  18  5  4  1  1  2   3  9  0  .222  .464  .722  1 | 357  83  2  .232  .641  14
 Rick Reuschel       2   2  0  0  0  0  0   0  0  1  .000  .000  .000  0 |+ 25   2  0  .080  .195   0
*Dave Righetti       1   1  0  0  0  0  0   0  0  1  .000  .000  .000  0 |   0   0  0               0
 Andre Robertson     1   0  0  0  0  0  0   0  0  0                    0 |  19   5  0  .263  .579   1
 Aurelio Rodriguez   4  12  1  5  0  0  0   0  1  2  .417  .462  .417  0 |  52  18  2  .346  .870   0
 Bob Watson          6  22  2  7  1  0  2   7  3  0  .318  .385  .636  0 | 156  33  6  .212  .701   0
 Dave Winfield       6  22  0  1  0  0  0   1  5  4  .045  .222  .045  1 | 388 114 13  .294  .824  11
+-------------------+-+---+--+--+--+--+--+---+--+--+-----+-----+-----+---+----+---+--+-----+-----+---+
 Total               6 193 22 46  8  1  6  22 33 24  .238  .346  .383  4 |        100  .252  .718  47
 
   * – bats left-handed, # – switch hits, ? – unknown, else – bats right-handed
   A + before season totals indicates the player was with multiple teams this year.

== Series pitching stats ==
=== Los Angeles Dodgers ===
                        SERIES STATS                     |     REGULAR SEASON           
 Player              G  ERA   W-L SV CG  IP   H ER BB SO |  W-L   IP  ERA   WHIP  SO SV 
+-------------------+-+------+---+--+--+----+--+--+--+---+------+---+-----+-----+---+--+
*Jerry Reuss         2   3.86 1-1  0  1 11.7 10  5  3  8 | 10-4  153  2.30  1.08  51   
 Burt Hooton         2   1.59 1-1  0  0 11.3  8  2  9  3 | 11-6  142  2.28  1.10  74   
*Fernando Valenzuela 1   4.00 1-0  0  1  9.0  9  4  7  6 | 13-7  192  2.48  1.05 180   
*Steve Howe          3   3.86 1-0  1  0  7.0  7  3  1  4 |  5-3   54  2.50  1.28  32  8
 Tom Niedenfuer      2   0.00 0-0  0  0  5.0  3  0  1  0 |  3-1   26  3.81  1.19  12  2
 Dave Goltz          2   5.40 0-0  0  0  3.3  4  2  1  2 |  2-7   77  4.09  1.40  48  1
*Terry Forster       2   0.00 0-0  0  0  2.0  1  0  3  0 |  0-1   31  4.11  1.70  17   
 Dave Stewart        2   0.00 0-0  0  0  1.7  1  0  2  1 |  4-3   43  2.49  1.25  29  6
 Bobby Castillo      1   9.00 0-0  0  0  1.0  0  1  5  0 |  2-4   51  5.33  1.46  35  5
 Bob Welch           1    inf 0-0  0  0  0.0  3  2  1  0 |  9-5  141  3.44  1.29  88   
+-------------------+-+------+---+--+--+----+--+--+--+---+------+---+-----+-----+---+--+
 Total                   3.29 4-2  1  2 52.0 46 19 33 24 |            3.01 1.210   
 
   * – throws left-handed, ? – unknown, else – throws right-handed
   A + before season totals indicates the player was with multiple teams this year.

=== New York Yankees ===
                        SERIES STATS                     |     REGULAR SEASON           
 Player              G  ERA   W-L SV CG  IP   H ER BB SO |  W-L   IP  ERA   WHIP  SO SV 
+-------------------+-+------+---+--+--+----+--+--+--+---+------+---+-----+-----+---+--+
*Ron Guidry          2   1.93 1-1  0  0 14.0  8  3  4 15 | 11-5  127  2.76  0.99 104   
*Tommy John          3   0.69 1-0  0  0 13.0 11  1  0  8 |  9-8  140  2.63  1.24  50   
*Rudy May            3   2.84 0-0  0  0  6.3  5  2  1  5 |  6-11 148  4.14  1.21  79  1
 Goose Gossage       3   0.00 0-0  2  0  5.0  2  0  2  5 |  3-2   47  0.77  0.77  48 20
 Rick Reuschel       2   4.91 0-0  0  0  3.7  7  2  3  2 |+ 8-11 156  3.11  1.25  75   
 George Frazier      3  17.18 0-3  0  0  3.7  9  7  3  2 |  0-1   28  1.63  1.34  17  3
 Ron Davis           4  23.14 0-0  0  0  2.3  4  6  5  4 |  4-5   73  2.71  0.99  83  6
*Dave Righetti       1  13.50 0-0  0  0  2.0  5  3  2  1 |  8-4  105  2.05  1.07  89   
*Dave LaRoche        1   0.00 0-0  0  0  1.0  0  0  0  2 |  4-1   47  2.49  1.15  24   
+-------------------+-+------+---+--+--+----+--+--+--+---+------+---+-----+-----+---+--+
 Total                   4.24 2-4  2  0 51.0 51 24 20 44 |            2.90 1.180   
 
   * – throws left-handed, ? – unknown, else – throws right-handed
   A + before season totals indicates the player was with multiple teams this year.

Yankees pitcher George Frazier tied a World Series record for losing three of the six games in 1981. The only other pitcher to lose that many was the Chicago White Sox's Lefty Williams, who intentionally lost his three starts in the infamous 1919 World Series.

== Broadcasting ==
ABC covered this World Series on television in the United States, its third under the then-present contract of alternating World Series coverage with NBC. Keith Jackson and Al Michaels shared play-by-play duties, with Michaels replacing Jackson when the latter deferred to his primary role as ABC's lead college football announcer. Color commentary was handled by Howard Cosell and Baltimore Orioles pitcher Jim Palmer; Palmer would later join ABC's baseball broadcast team after retiring as a player in 1984. ABC's coverage was simulcast over the Yankees' and Dodgers' local television outlets, respectively WPIX in New York City and KTTV in Los Angeles.

This World Series was the last to be called by Jackson in the broadcast booth. Michaels became ABC's lead baseball play-by-play announcer (and their exclusive World Series announcer) by the time ABC next aired the World Series in 1983.

On radio, CBS Radio carried the games with Vin Scully handling play-by-play and Detroit Tigers manager Sparky Anderson providing analysis, both working together for the third consecutive year. Scully was the Dodgers' primary radio and television announcer during the regular season. When the Dodgers next appeared in the World Series in 1988, Scully called the series nationally on television for NBC.

== In popular culture ==
After the series, Johnstone, Yeager, Reuss, and Rick Monday of the Dodgers recorded a cover version of Queen's "We Are the Champions" under the name "Big Blue Wrecking Crew". The quartet performed the song on an episode of the syndicated musical TV show Solid Gold.

== Epilogue ==
After combining for ten division titles and eight World Series appearances between 1974 and 1981, the 1981 World Series marked the end of an era for both teams as they soon were without key contributors.

The Yankees lost Reggie Jackson (who left in free agency), Graig Nettles (traded to the San Diego Padres in 1984), Goose Gossage (left in free agency in 1984, also to the Padres, only to play once more with them in 1989), and Tommy John (traded away to the California Angels in 1982 before returning in 1986), among others. Bob Lemon lasted fourteen games in the next season before being dismissed by Steinbrenner despite promises to finish the whole season (although Lemon was quoted as being relieved over the decision). The franchise would not reach the postseason again until 1995, which included nine different managers at the helm for Yankees (such as Billy Martin, who was re-hired and re-fired three times from 1983 to 1988 after having led the Yankees to victory against the Dodgers in the 1977 World Series) despite worthy play from Winfield and Don Mattingly, who debuted in 1982 (incidentally, Steinbrenner's growing irritation with Winfield would soon lead to a three-year ban from baseball and Winfield's subsequent trade to the Angels). The lone World Series appearance in the 1980s meant it was the first decade in which the Yankees did not win a title since the 1910s, and the first since the live-ball era, which would not happen again until the 2010s.

Key Dodger losses included Reggie Smith (who signed with the San Francisco Giants after the season), Davey Lopes (traded in the off season), Ron Cey (traded in 1982), Steve Garvey (who departed for the San Diego Padres in 1983). This marked the end of the 8 1/2-year Dodger infield of Garvey, Lopes, Russell and Cey. With a stronger farm system and adding valuable players via trade or free agency, they did win division titles in 1983 and 1985, while narrowly missing in 1982. However, they lost in the NLCS both years. Their success culminated with a world championship in 1988, becoming the only team to win two World Series between 1978 and 1990, and the only team to win more than one World Series title during the 1980s. However, since their 1988 World Series win, the Dodgers would not appear in another World Series until 2017 (which they lost to the Houston Astros), despite reaching the NLCS in 2008, 2009, 2013, and 2016. They would also appear in the World Series in 2018 against the Boston Red Sox, which they also lost. They finally broke their World Series Championship drought by winning in 2020 against the Tampa Bay Rays. They returned to the World Series in 2024, in which they defeated the Yankees. They would defend their title in 2025 against the Toronto Blue Jays. The Yankees, on the other hand, appeared in eight World Series (1996, 1998, 1999, 2000, 2001, 2003, 2009, and 2024) in that span, winning all but 2001, 2003 and 2024.

Former Dodgers pitcher and later Spanish radio color analyst Fernando Valenzuela, who notably threw 147 pitches in the Dodgers Game 3 victory and was one of the Dodgers' most prominent players during the 1981 season, died shortly before the 2024 Dodgers-Yankees World Series rematch. The Dodgers afterwards announced plans to pay tribute to Valenzuela at the 2024 World Series. The Dodgers celebrated their World Series victory on what would have been Fernando's 64th birthday. The following season, the Dodgers defended their title and won the World Series against the Blue Jays in seven games. Game 7 was played on what would have been Fernando's 65th birthday.

== See also ==
- 1981 Japan Series
- Dodgers-Yankees rivalry
