= Terry Felton =

American baseball player

- Pitcher
- Born: October 29, 1957 (age 68); Texarkana, Arkansas, U.S.
- Batted: Right Threw: Right

MLB debut
- September 28, 1979, for the Minnesota Twins

Last MLB appearance
- September 28, 1982, for the Minnesota Twins

MLB statistics
- Win–loss record: 0–16
- Earned run average: 5.53
- Strikeouts: 108
- Stats at Baseball Reference

Teams
- Minnesota Twins (1979–1982)

Terry Lane Felton (born October 29, 1957) is a former pitcher for the Minnesota Twins. Felton holds some of the most dubious career pitching records in Major League Baseball (MLB) history, including the most consecutive losses to start a career, most career losses without a win (16) and most innings pitched without a win (138 1/3).

He was released by the Twins after the 1982 season in which he went 0–13, the last time an MLB pitcher had zero wins and at least twelve losses. It's also the single-season record for most losses without a win by an MLB pitcher. When added to his 0–3 record coming into the season, this gave him a combined lifetime record of 0–16. Felton was also the Minor League Baseball record holder for the most career wins (33) with the Toledo Mud Hens, until broken by Shane Loux in 2004.

Felton married his wife, Jana, a former classmate at Baker High School, in 1981. Felton became a detective and later a captain in the East Baton Rouge Parish Sheriff's Office. He made minor headlines in July 2004, when his two-year-old daughter was attacked by the family Rottweiler. Felton shot and killed the dog. His daughter is said to have only suffered minor injuries.
