= Butch Wynegar =

American baseball player (born 1956)

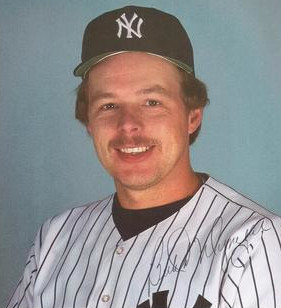
- Wynegar in 1984
- Catcher
- Born: March 14, 1956 (age 70); York, Pennsylvania, U.S.
- Batted: Switch Threw: Right

MLB debut
- April 9, 1976, for the Minnesota Twins

Last MLB appearance
- May 24, 1988, for the California Angels

MLB statistics
- Batting average: .255
- Home runs: 65
- Runs batted in: 506
- Stats at Baseball Reference

Teams
- Minnesota Twins (1976–1982); New York Yankees (1982–1986); California Angels (1987–1988)

Career highlights and awards
- 2× All-Star (1976, 1977)

Harold Delano "Butch" Wynegar Jr. (/ˈwaɪnɛɡər/ WY-neh-gər; born March 14, 1956) is an American former professional baseball catcher who played 13 seasons in Major League Baseball (MLB). He played for the Minnesota Twins, New York Yankees and California Angels, and was a two-time All Star.

== Playing career ==
=== Minor leagues ===
Wynegar was drafted by the Minnesota Twins in the second round of the 1974 Major League Baseball draft. In his first season in professional baseball, he batted a league-leading .346 batting average and .464 on base percentage with a .524 slugging percentage and eight home runs and 51 RBIs (5th in the league) for the Rookie League Elizabethton Twins, and was named an Appalachian League All Star.

In 1975, Wynegar played for the unaffiliated Reno Silver Sox of the California League, and batted .314 (4th in the league)/.473 (2nd in the league/.500 (4th in the league). He led the league with 142 walks and 112 RBIs, and was 2nd in the league with 106 runs and 19 home runs. (Reno was officially unaffiliated, but had agreements with the Twins and the San Diego Padres to take players on optional assignment from those teams.)

=== Minnesota Twins ===
The Twins invited him to their spring training camp in 1976, where he successfully made the team, never having played Double or Triple-A baseball. To date, Wynegar is the only catcher to have ever jumped directly from A-ball to the majors.

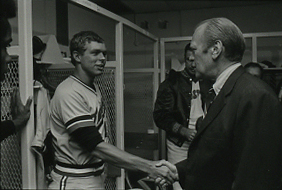
Wynegar (left) with Gerald Ford in 1976

Wynegar proved to be adept both behind the plate and batting. In 1976 he was the fourth-youngest baseball player in the AL. His first major league home run was a game-winner off Catfish Hunter on April 18, 1976. Wynegar was batting .294 with six home runs and 37 runs batted in at the 1976 All-Star break and was named to the American League All-Star team his rookie season. He drew a walk in his only plate appearance, and became the youngest player at the time to appear in an All-Star Game (20 years, 212 days). For the season, Wynegar had 650 putouts, second in the league behind Jim Sundberg, and batted .260 with ten home runs and 69 RBIs and was 9th in the league in walks, with 79. He finished second in the 1976 American League Rookie of the Year balloting to Mark Fidrych, and was named The Sporting News Rookie of the Year.

Wynegar had six home runs and 47 RBIs at the midpoint of the 1977 season to make his second consecutive All-Star team. He drove in a career high 79 runs for the season, and had established himself as one of the better fielding catchers by leading the American League in baserunners caught stealing with 60, and logging a .993 fielding percentage along with 84 assists, second only to Sundberg.

He led the league again in 1979, throwing out 64 baserunners, led the league in caught-stealing percentage at 52.9%, and once again finished second to Sundberg in fielding percentage with a .992 average. In 1980, he led all AL catchers in double plays, with 13.

Wynegar signed a $2 million, five-year contract with the Twins in 1981. He was traded along with Roger Erickson from the Twins to the Yankees for Larry Milbourne, John Pacella and Pete Filson on May 12, 1982. Wynegar claimed that Twins owner Calvin Griffith wanted to get rid of high-priced players however, Griffith responded that Wynegar was being traded because his batting average was only .209.

=== New York Yankees ===
Wynegar hit well with the Yankees in 1982, producing a .293 average in 63 games. He had more walks than strikeouts, leading to a .413 on base percentage.

He platooned with Rick Cerone behind the plate in 1983, batting .296./.399/.429 in 94 games. He was the Yankees catcher on July 4, 1983, when Dave Righetti pitched a no hitter in Yankee Stadium against the Boston Red Sox.

Wynegar became the Yankees starting catcher in 1984, playing in 129 games. His average dipped to .267 in 1984, and fell further to .223 in 1985, in part due to an injury that occurred when he was hit in the head by a foul ball while standing in the on deck circle. In 1985, Wynegar caught both Phil Niekro's 3000th strike out and his 300th win.

After three and a half seasons with New York, Wynegar became a free agent and re-signed with the Yankees for the 1986 season. However, the stress of playing for a high-profile team in New York City led by owner George Steinbrenner, manager Billy Martin, and then manager Lou Piniella began to wear on him and led to him suffering from a deep depression. A contract dispute in 1985, the firing of Yankee manager Yogi Berra, and a personality conflict with new Yankee manager Billy Martin took their toll on Wynegar's morale. In July 1986, Wynegar informed the Yankees that he had lost his enthusiasm for the game and did not want to play in New York anymore. He called Clyde King, the general manager, and asked him for permission for some time off, explaining that he could no longer cope. After talking to owner Steinbrenner, King told Wynegar he could have one day off. But the game was no longer fun for Wynegar and he told King "this was no one-day thing," departed for home, and did not play for the rest of the season. He left the team forfeiting $1.4 million ($4,100,000 in current dollar terms) still owed on his contract.

Months later, Wynegar requested to be traded. The Yankees traded Wynegar to the California Angels on December 19, 1986, for pitcher Ron Romanick and player to be named later relief pitcher Alan Mills.

=== California Angels ===
With the Angels, Wynegar became a back-up for the first time in his career, working behind Bob Boone during the 1987 season. In May 1987 the Angels' team physician removed bone spurs from his arthritic right big toe, and operated again after the season removing calcium deposits from Wynegar's foot.

He retired as a player early in the 1988 season at the age of 32, as he was batting .255/.338/.418, due to his arthritic big toe.

== Managing and coaching career ==
In 1991 and 1992, Wynegar coached at Rollins College. In 1994, he became the manager of the Baltimore Orioles' South Atlantic League affiliate, the Albany Polecats. A year later, in 1995, Wynegar was named manager of the Charlotte Rangers of the Florida State League, where he remained through the 1997 season. He spent the next five seasons, through 2002, as the Texas Rangers' roving hitting instructor, and part of 1999 as the Rangers major league bullpen coach.

From 2003 to 2006 Wynegar was the hitting coach for the Milwaukee Brewers. In 2007, he went back in the New York Yankees' organization, serving as hitting coach through 2014 for the AAA Scranton/Wilkes-Barre RailRiders.

In 2015, Wynegar moved to the Pirates organization as AAA Indianapolis Indians hitting coach. In 2018, he was made hitting coach of the Pirates' Class A-Advanced affiliate Bradenton Marauders.

== Career statistics ==
In a 13-year major league career, Wynegar played in 1,301 games, accumulating 1,102 hits in 4,330 at bats for a .255 career batting average along with 65 home runs and 506 runs batted in. He ended his career with a .989 fielding percentage. Wynegar logged 10,521 innings behind the plate in his career.

== Personal life ==
Wynegar grew up in York, Pennsylvania, the son of Harold D. Wynegar Sr. and Dorrea L. "Dee" (Storm) Wynegar. He attended Red Lion High School. Wynegar had a son, Mark, with his wife, Deborah.
