= Lenny Faedo =

American baseball player (born 1960)

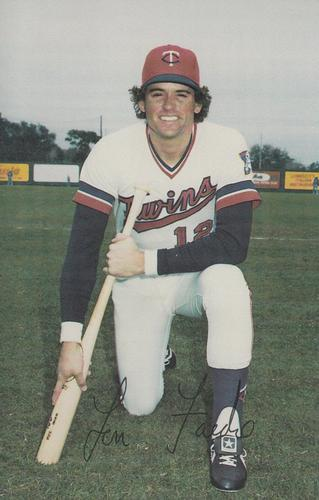
- Shortstop
- Born: May 13, 1960 (age 65); Tampa, Florida, U.S.
- Batted: Right Threw: Right

MLB debut
- September 6, 1980, for the Minnesota Twins

Last MLB appearance
- April 22, 1984, for the Minnesota Twins

MLB statistics
- Batting average: .251
- Home runs: 5
- Runs batted in: 52
- Stats at Baseball Reference

Teams
- Minnesota Twins (1980–1984)

Leonardo Lago Faedo (born May 13, 1960) is a former professional baseball shortstop. He played in Major League Baseball (MLB) from 1980 until 1984 for the Minnesota Twins. In 1978, he won the Tony Saladino Award, which went yearly to the top baseball player in Hillsborough County.

== Pro career ==
Faedo was drafted by the Minnesota Twins in the first round, with the 16th overall selection, in the 1978 MLB draft, two spots behind a future teammate, Tom Brunansky. Faedo was assigned to the Elizabethton Twins of the Appalachian League, where he was teammates with another player the Twins had acquired in an earlier draft, pitcher Jesse Orosco. After batting .280 in his first professional season, the Twins saw enough in Faedo that they promoted him the following season to their Double-A affiliate, the Orlando Twins of the Southern League. While Faedo wasn't imposing at the plate, the Twins saw enough in his fielding that in 1980, they promoted him to the club midway through the 1980 season from Orlando which meant Faedo skipped an entire level of development and was promoted to the majors.

At just 20 years old, Faedo was in the majors. While his first stay was brief, the Twins returned Faedo to the minor leagues for the 1981 season, where he played for their top affiliate, the Toledo Mud Hens. He had another cup of coffee in 1981, however, in 1982, he appeared to be on the verge of locking down the role of the Twins regular shortstop. On July 20, 1982, the Twins were playing the Milwaukee Brewers, in a game which featured a bench clearing brawl. In the fifth inning, Twins first baseman Kent Hrbek made a hard slide into Brewers second baseman Jim Gantner. In the sixth, Brewers shortstop Robin Yount ran over Faedo, which touched off a brawl. At the end of the brawl, Hrbek and Brewers pitcher Bob McClure were ejected from the game.

In 1983, Faedo backed-up Ron Washington, appearing in 51 games. In 1984, the Twins had a platoon at short, which included Washington, Faedo, Houston Jimenez, and Chris Speier. By the time 1985 rolled around, Faedo was out of the picture as the Twins had settled on Greg Gagne to be the team's regular shortstop. Faedo spent the 1985 season in the farm system of the Kansas City Royals. After Kansas City released him, Faedo signed with the Los Angeles Dodgers and spent his final season in their farm system before retiring from baseball at the conclusion of the 1986 season.

After his playing career was over, Faedo was briefly the hitting instructor for the Detroit Tigers.

== Personal life ==
Faedo is the cousin of former Detroit Tigers pitcher Alex Faedo.
