= Ahuvah Gray =

American writer (born 1944)

- Born: Delores Gray; Chicago, Illinois, U.S.
- Website: ahuvahgray.com

Ahuva Gray (born 1944 or 1945) is an American writer on religion and memoirist. She is a former Baptist minister who converted to Judaism and chronicled her changing beliefs in the book My Sister, the Jew, published in 2001.

== Biography ==
Gray is African-American and was born to a Baptist working-class family in the Lawndale neighborhood of Chicago. She is a relative of baseball player Lorenzo Gray. Each summer, she and her siblings visited her sharecropper grandparents in Mound Bayou, Mississippi. Her first experience with Judaism was in seventh grade, when she began working in a dress shop owned by a Jewish family.

After college, Gray worked for 23 years for Continental Airlines, working first as a flight attendant and later becoming an executive. After Continental Airlines transferred Gray to Los Angeles, she became involved in a Baptist church, and was later ordained at the International Assemblies of God in San Diego. Gray's church emphasized Christianity's Jewish roots, leading her to interact with local Jewish leaders and academics and to begin leading tour groups in the Middle East. She also began to pray using the Jewish siddur. She found herself disagreeing with some Christian dogma, such as original sin and the trinity.

After a 1994 earthquake in California, Gray moved to Israel. Wanting to study Judaism further, she entered the Nishmat College for Women in Jerusalem and supported herself by cleaning homes. In 1996, at age 51, she completed conversion through the Jerusalem beth din to become an Orthodox Jew. She took the name of Ahuva.

In Israel, Gray has worked as a tour guide, and as a lecturer abroad. Gray has lived in Bayit VeGan, Jerusalem since the mid-1990s. She identified as Haredi.

== Personal life ==
While working for Continental Airlines, she married; she and her husband divorced amicably after 16 years, and had no children.

Gray remains close with her non-Jewish family, who were supportive of her conversion.

== Bibliography ==
- My Sister the Jew. Philipp Feldheim Inc. 2001. ISBN 1-56871-276-6.
- Gifts of a Stranger: A Convert's Round-the-world Travels and Spiritual Journeys. Targum Press. 2004. ISBN 978-1-56871-331-1.
