= Chico Escárrega =

Mexican baseball player (born 1949)

- Relief pitcher
- Born: 27 December 1949 (age 76); Los Mochis, Sinaloa, Mexico
- Batted: Right Threw: Right

MLB debut
- April 26, 1982, for the Chicago White Sox

Last MLB appearance
- September 27, 1982, for the Chicago White Sox

MLB statistics
- Win–loss record: 1–3
- Earned run average: 3.67
- Strikeouts: 33
- Stats at Baseball Reference

Teams
- Chicago White Sox (1982)

Member of the Mexican Professional

Baseball Hall of Fame
- Induction: 2002

Ernesto "Chico" Escárrega (born 27 December 1949) is a Mexican former Major League Baseball pitcher who played for the Chicago White Sox in their 1982 season.

== Baseball career ==
Escárrega debuted in 1970 in the Mexican League playing for the Diablos Rojos del México and won the Rookie of the Year award that same season, with a 5–1 record. In 1973, Escárrega was traded to the Pericos de Puebla, where he played for the next eight seasons.

Escárrega was signed as an undrafted free agent by the Chicago White Sox after having pitched ten years in the Mexican League.

Escárrega entered major league baseball in 1982, as a 32-year-old rookie, the year that future Hall-of-Famer Cal Ripken Jr. ended up winning the AL rookie of the year title. Pitching primarily in relief, he went 1-3 in 73.2 innings with a 3.67 ERA, 33 strikeouts and a WHIP of 1.21.

The White Sox sold Escárrega back to the Mexican League's Diablos Rojos del México after the 1982 season. He pitched in Mexico in 1983–84 and again in 1988.

In 2002, Escárrega was elected to the Mexican Professional Baseball Hall of Fame.
