= Pete Filson =

American baseball player (born 1958)

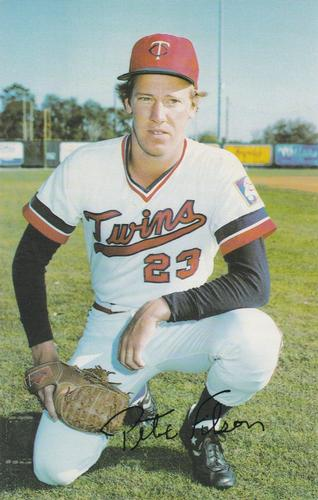
- Pitcher
- Born: September 28, 1958 (age 68); Darby, Pennsylvania, U.S.
- Batted: Switch Threw: Left

MLB debut
- May 15, 1982, for the Minnesota Twins

Last MLB appearance
- August 11, 1990, for the Kansas City Royals

MLB statistics
- Win–loss record: 15–18
- Earned run average: 4.18
- Strikeouts: 187
- Stats at Baseball Reference

Teams
- Minnesota Twins (1982–1986); Chicago White Sox (1986); New York Yankees (1987); Kansas City Royals (1990)

William Peter Filson (born September 28, 1958) is an American former professional baseball pitcher. He played during seven seasons in Major League Baseball (MLB) for the Minnesota Twins, Chicago White Sox, New York Yankees, and Kansas City Royals.

== Playing career ==
Filson attended Temple University, and in 1977 and 1978 he played collegiate summer baseball with the Hyannis Mets of the Cape Cod Baseball League. He was selected by the Yankees in the 9th round of the 1979 MLB draft.

Filson played his first professional season with their Rookie league Paintsville Yankees and Class-A (Short Season) Oneonta Yankees in 1979, and split his last between Kansas City and their Triple-A Omaha Royals in 1990. Filson can be seen delivering a single pitch as a Royal in the Ken Burns documentary Baseball, at the beginning of the section entitled "Extra Innings."

He was dealt along with Larry Milbourne and John Pacella from the Yankees to the Twins for Butch Wynegar and Roger Erickson on May 12, 1982.

With the Twins, Filson was affectionately nicknamed "Freeze".

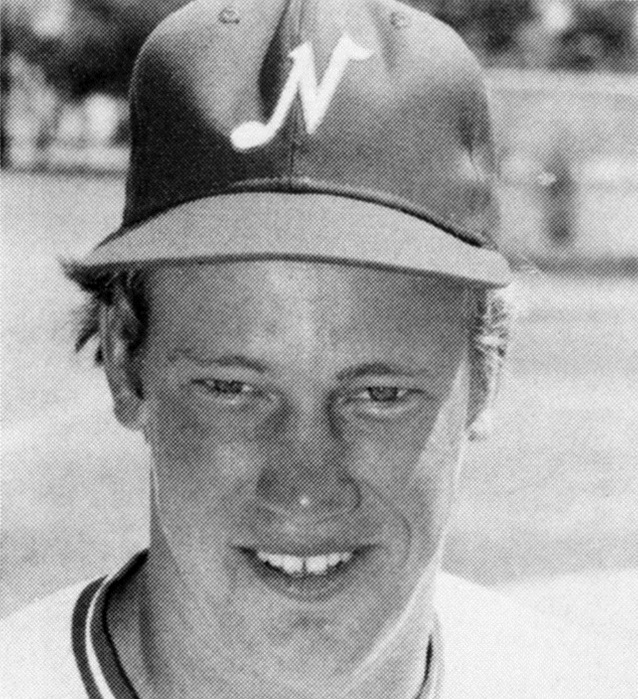
Filson with the Nashville Sounds in 1981

== Coaching career ==
In 2003 Filson was hired as pitching coach for the Newark Bears of the independent Atlantic League, Filson remained with the team until 2006.

Filson is currently a pitching instructor at AFC Baseball in Bala Cynwyd, Pennsylvania, where he provides instruction to players at Harriton High School, Radnor High School, the Chester County Crawdads, and Wayne Wolverines.
