= Fred Nelson =

Australian rugby league footballer and coach (1934–2018)

Personal information
- Full name: Fred Nelson
- Born: 15 February 1934 Mascot, New South Wales, Australia
- Died: 11 June 2018 (aged 83)

Playing information
- Position: Second-row
Club
Years	Team	Pld	T	G	FG	P
1956–61	South Sydney	82	9	0	0	27
1962	Manly-Warringah	14	3	0	0	9
	Total	96	12	0	0	36
Representative
Years	Team	Pld	T	G	FG	P
1959	New South Wales	1	0	0	0	0

Fred Nelson was an Australian professional rugby league footballer who played in the 1950s and 1960s. He played for South Sydney and Manly-Warringah in the NSWRL competition.

== Early life ==
Nelson was born in Mascot, Sydney and played his junior rugby league with Mascot before signing with South Sydney in 1954. Nelson won the Presidents Cup premiership with Souths that same year.

== Playing career ==
Nelson made his first grade debut for Souths in 1956. Nelson's time at South Sydney was at a difficult period in the club's history. After winning 5 premierships throughout the decade, Souths went through a period of finishing near the bottom of the table after most of their star players such as Clive Churchill had retired and moved on. In total, Nelson played over 100 games for the club including reserve grade and third grade. While playing for South Sydney, Nelson represented New South Wales making one appearance. In 1962, Nelson joined Manly-Warringah playing one season for the club before retiring.

In 1959 Nelson won the Sydney Morning Herald Award for Best and Fairest Player of the Year.

== Coaching career ==
In 1967, Nelson coached the Arncliffe Scots who played in the local St George competition. Nelson then went on to coach the South Sydney reserve grade side and won a premiership with them in 1968.
