= Rich Barnes =

American baseball player (born 1959)

- Pitcher
- Born: July 21, 1959 (age 65); Palm Beach, Florida, U.S.
- Batted: Right Threw: Left

MLB debut
- July 18, 1982, for the Chicago White Sox

Last MLB appearance
- September 25, 1983, for the Cleveland Indians

MLB statistics
- Win–loss record: 1-3
- Earned run average: 5.65
- Strikeouts: 8
- Stats at Baseball Reference

Teams
- Chicago White Sox (1982); Cleveland Indians (1983)

Richard Monroe Barnes (born July 21, 1959) is an American former professional baseball pitcher who appeared in parts of two seasons in the Major League Baseball (MLB), playing for the Chicago White Sox in 1982 and the Cleveland Indians in 1983.

He made his MLB debut at age 22 on July 18, 1982 and appeared in his last game at the age of 24 on September 25, 1983.
