= Brad Gulden =

American baseball player (born 1956)

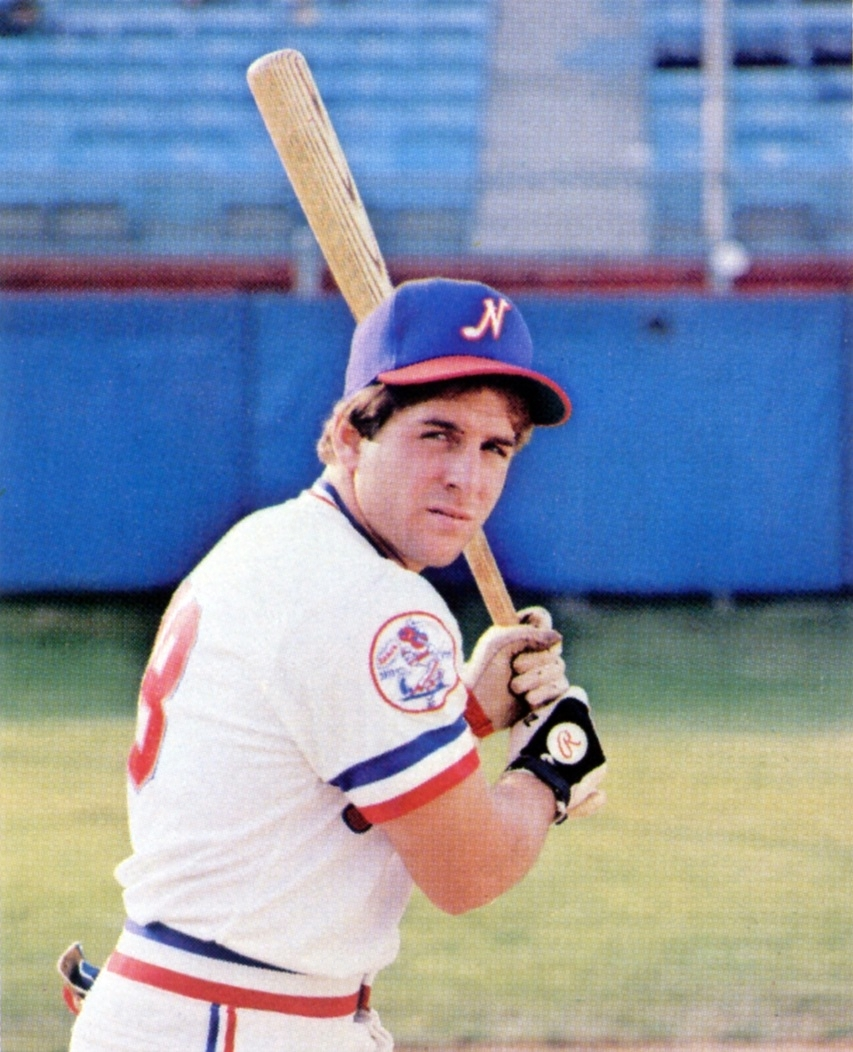
- Gulden with the Nashville Sounds in 1980
- Catcher
- Born: June 10, 1956 (age 70); New Ulm, Minnesota, U.S.
- Batted: Left Threw: Right

MLB debut
- September 22, 1978, for the Los Angeles Dodgers

Last MLB appearance
- September 28, 1986, for the San Francisco Giants

MLB statistics
- Batting average: .200
- Home runs: 5
- Runs batted in: 43
- Stats at Baseball Reference

Teams
- Los Angeles Dodgers (1978); New York Yankees (1979–1980); Seattle Mariners (1981); Montreal Expos (1982); Cincinnati Reds (1984); San Francisco Giants (1986)

Bradley Lee Gulden (born June 10, 1956) is an American former professional baseball player. He played as a catcher in Major League Baseball (MLB) between 1978 and 1986 for the Los Angeles Dodgers, New York Yankees, Seattle Mariners, Montreal Expos, Cincinnati Reds, and San Francisco Giants.

== Baseball career and the original Humm-Baby ==
Gulden was born in New Ulm, Minnesota and graduated from Chaska High School near Minneapolis–Saint Paul. He was drafted by the Los Angeles Dodgers in the 17th round (408th overall) of the 1975 Major League Baseball draft. In 1978, he played for the Triple-A Albuquerque Dukes of the Pacific Coast League, appearing in 125 games and posting a .294 batting average along with eight home runs and 72 runs batted in (RBI). Gulden's performance earned him a late-season promotion to the major leagues, where he made his debut on September 22, 1978, at the age of 22.

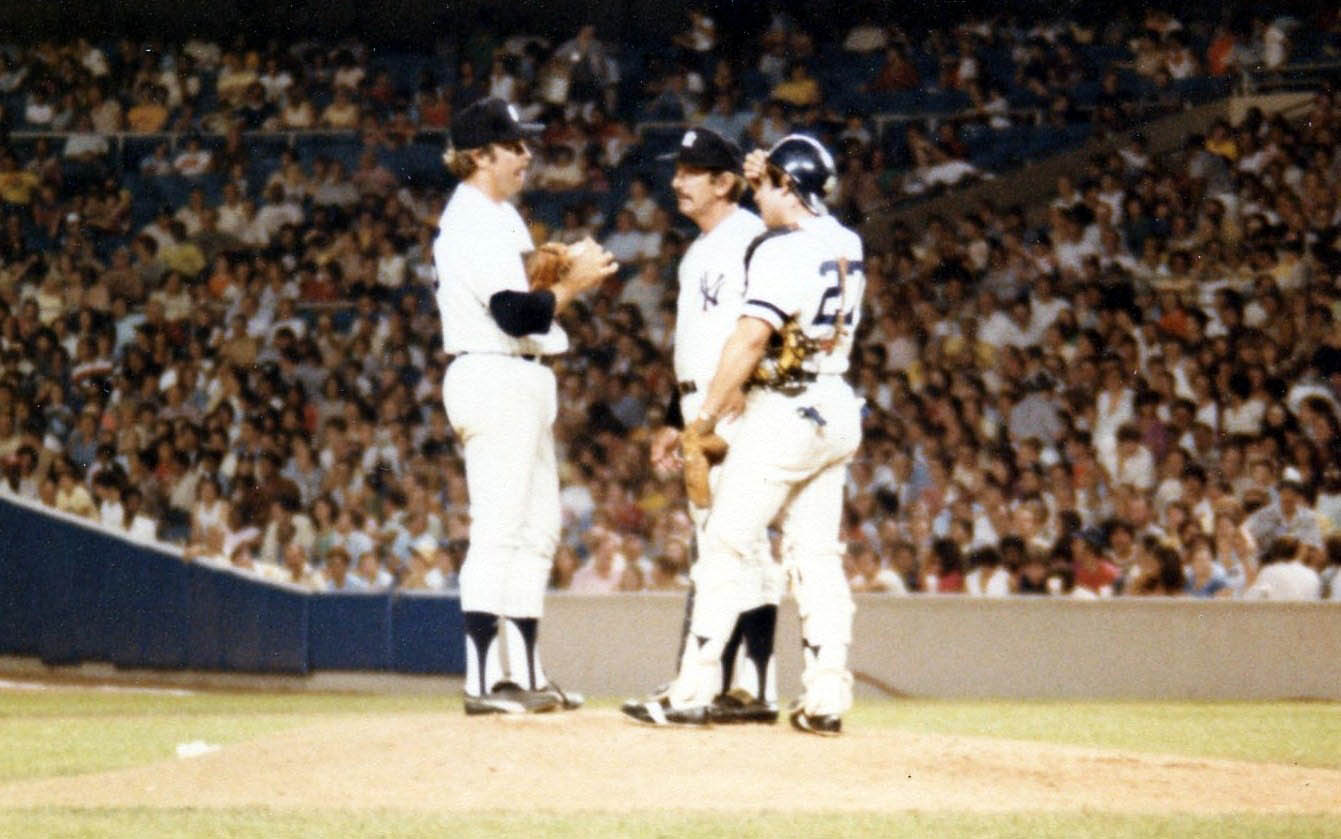
Gulden with Catfish Hunter and Billy Martin during a 1979 game right after Thurman Munson's funeral, with black memorial armband visible.

On February 15, 1979, the Dodgers traded Gulden to the New York Yankees for Gary Thomasson. His offensive production declined in 1979, as he finished with a .248 batting average along with six home runs and 34 RBI in 80 games with the Triple-A Columbus Clippers of the International League. On August 3, 1979, during the Yankees' first game after the death of Thurman Munson in an airplane crash the previous day, Gulden replaced starting catcher Jerry Narron in the ninth inning. Gulden started on August 6 in the team's first game after Munson's funeral, only to be replaced himself in the ninth by Narron.

Gulden holds a place in Major League Baseball trivia by being one of four players in history to be traded for himself, along with Harry Chiti, Dickie Noles, and John McDonald. On November 18, 1980, the New York Yankees sent him to the Seattle Mariners with $150,000 for a player to be named and Larry Milbourne. In May 1981, the Mariners sent Gulden back to the Yankees as the player to be named. This kind of swap happened to Gulden again, as he was traded by the Yankees in April 1982 for catcher Bobby Ramos — only to be sold back to the Yankees after the season. Meanwhile, Ramos was sold back to the Expos.

One of the highlights of Gulden’s career occurred on May 30, 1984 when, as a member of the Cincinnati Reds, he hit a walk-off 3-run homer with two outs in the bottom of the 14th inning off Don Robinson, giving the Reds a 6-4 win over the Pittsburgh Pirates.

At the beginning of the 1986 season, Gulden was with the San Francisco Giants and fighting for a roster spot behind Bob Brenly and Bob Melvin. His hustle and work ethic inspired manager Roger Craig to nickname him a “Humm Baby”, because “he didn't have a lot of talent, but he gave you 180 percent; that's the way Brad (was). Humm-baby.” Gulden made the team as the third-string catcher, and Humm-Baby spread from only Gulden until it applied to the entire Giants team, and it eventually became synonymous with Roger Craig. He appeared in his final major league game with the Giants on September 28, 1986, at the age of 30. Gulden played in fewer than 10 games in four of his seven major league seasons and finished with a career batting average of .200.
