= Juan Espino (baseball) =

Dominican baseball player (born 1956)

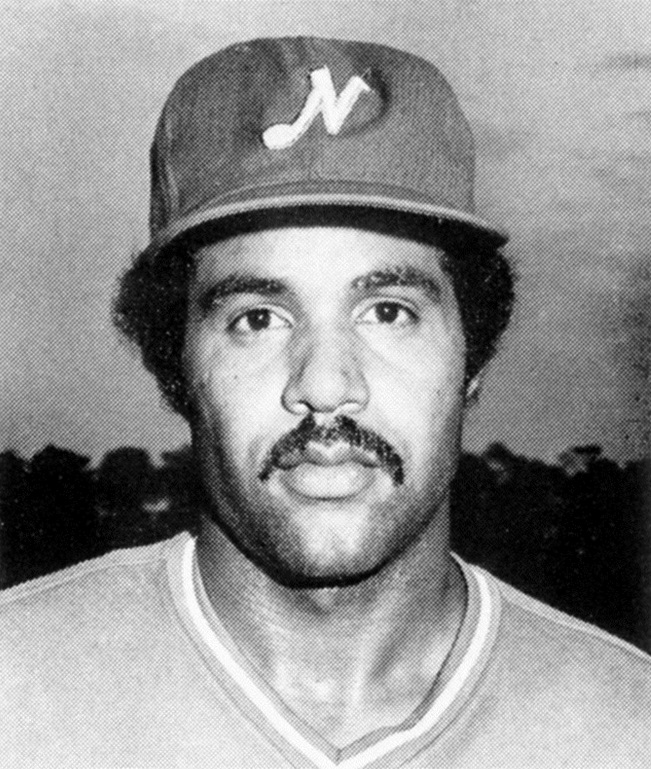
- Espino with the Nashville Sounds in 1980
- Catcher
- Born: March 16, 1956 (age 70); Bonao, Dominican Republic
- Batted: Right Threw: Right

MLB debut
- June 25, 1982, for the New York Yankees

Last MLB appearance
- October 5, 1986, for the New York Yankees

MLB statistics
- Batting average: .219
- Runs: 2
- Hits: 16
- Stats at Baseball Reference

Teams
- New York Yankees (1982–1983, 1985–1986)

Juan Espino Reyes (born March 16, 1956) is a Dominican former Major League Baseball (MLB) catcher. He played during four seasons at the major league level for the New York Yankees. He was signed as an amateur free agent by the Yankees in 1974. Espino played his first professional season with their Class A Oneonta Yankees in 1975, and his last with the Atlanta Braves' Triple-A club, the Richmond Braves in 1988.
