= Lorenzo Gray =

American baseball player (born 1958)

- Third baseman
- Born: March 4, 1958 (age 67); Mound Bayou, Mississippi, U.S.
- Batted: Right Threw: Right

MLB debut
- July 8, 1982, for the Chicago White Sox

Last MLB appearance
- July 26, 1983, for the Chicago White Sox

MLB statistics
- Batting average: .208
- Home runs: 1
- Runs batted in: 4
- Stats at Baseball Reference

Teams
- Chicago White Sox (1982–1983)

Lorenzo Gray (born March 4, 1958) is an American former baseball player. He played parts of two seasons in Major League Baseball (MLB), 1982 and 1983, for the Chicago White Sox. He played a total of 58 games in the majors, mostly at third base.

He is a relative of author Ahuvah Gray.

== Sources ==
- Career statistics from Baseball Reference · Baseball Reference (Minors) · Retrosheet · Baseball Almanac
