= Curt Kaufman =

American baseball player (born 1957)

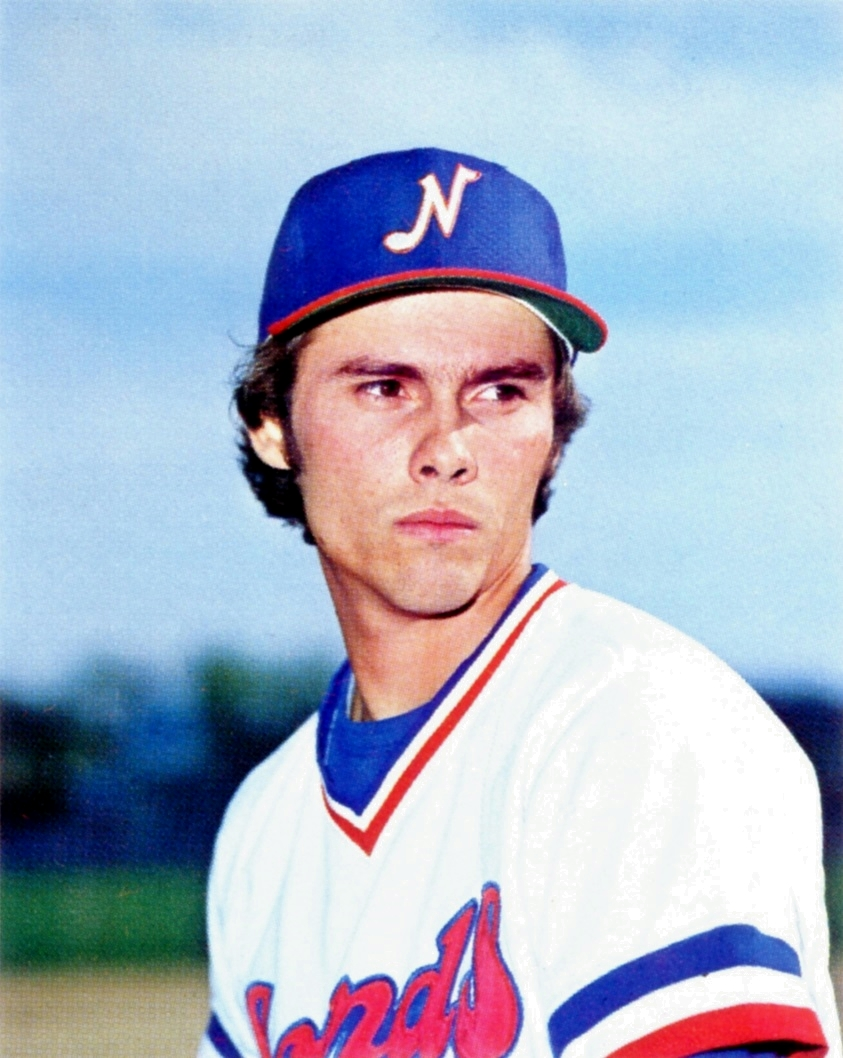
- Kaufman with the Nashville Sounds in 1981
- Pitcher
- Born: July 19, 1957 (age 69); Omaha, Nebraska
- Batted: Right Threw: Right

MLB debut
- September 10, 1982, for the New York Yankees

Last MLB appearance
- September 25, 1984, for the California Angels

MLB statistics
- Win–loss record: 3–3
- Earned run average: 4.48
- Innings pitched: 86 1/3
- Stats at Baseball Reference

Teams
- New York Yankees (1982–1983); California Angels (1984)

Curt Gerard Kaufman (born July 19, 1957) is an American former professional baseball pitcher. He played in Major League Baseball (MLB) for the New York Yankees (1982–1983) and California Angels (1984). He threw and batted right-handed, stood 6 feet 2 inches (1.88 m) tall and weighed 175 pounds (79 kg).

== Career ==
After graduating from high school, Kaufman received an athletic scholarship to Iowa State University. He then worked his way through the minors with ease, even setting the International League record for saves in a season (25). He was then recognized for his efforts by the Yankees, who called him up in 1982. He remained a Yankee through the 1983 season, but was traded to the California Angels after the season for infielder Tim Foli. He only played one season with the Angels; his career was cut short by a career ending elbow surgery. He retired after the surgery with a career ERA of 4.48, 50 strikeouts, a save, and an overall record of 3–3.

Kaufman currently coaches the JV team at Glenwood, Iowa.

== Sources ==
- Career statistics from Baseball Reference · Baseball Reference (Minors) · Retrosheet · Baseball Almanac
