= Paul Boris =

American baseball player (born 1955)

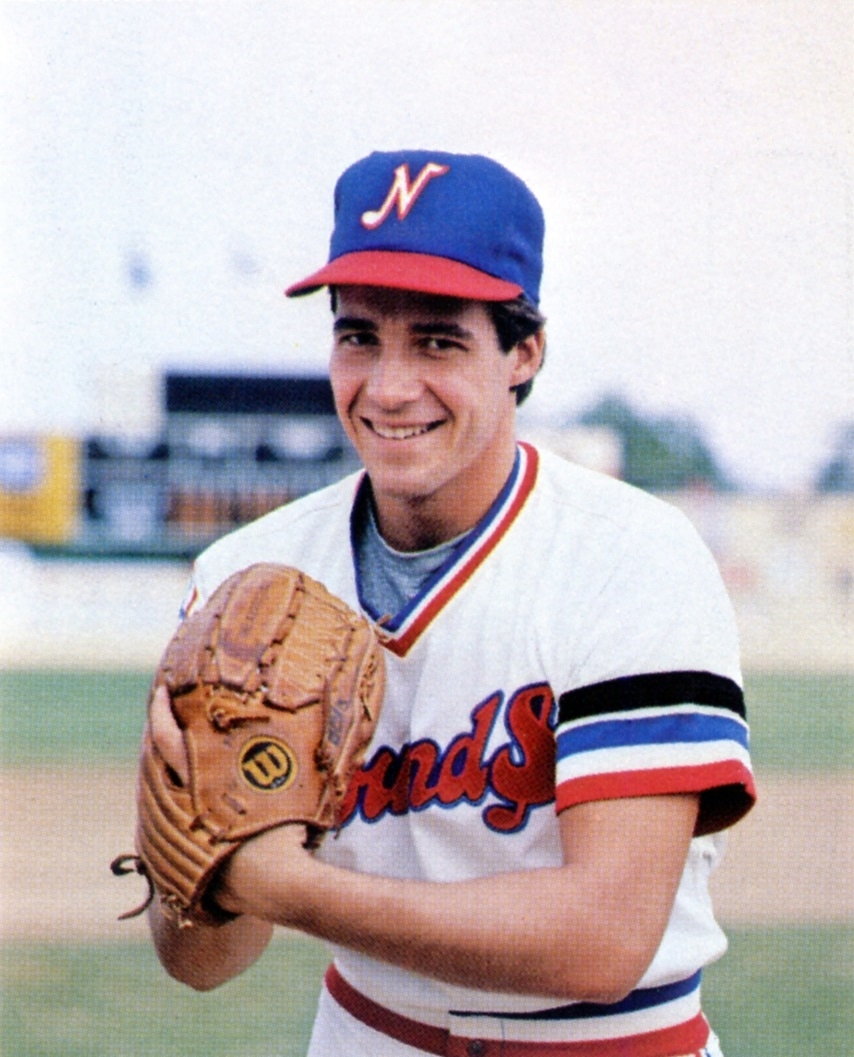
- Boris with the Nashville Sounds in 1980
- Pitcher
- Born: December 13, 1955 (age 70); Irvington, New Jersey, U.S.
- Batted: Right Threw: Right

MLB debut
- May 21, 1982, for the Minnesota Twins

Last MLB appearance
- October 3, 1982, for the Minnesota Twins

MLB statistics
- Win–loss record: 1–2
- Earned run average: 3.99
- Strikeouts: 30
- Stats at Baseball Reference

Teams
- Minnesota Twins (1982)

Paul Stanley Boris (born December 13, 1955) is an American former Major League Baseball (MLB) pitcher. He played for the Minnesota Twins in 1982.

== Career ==
Borris was signed by the New York Yankees as an amateur free agent in 1978. He played his first professional season with their Class A Fort Lauderdale Yankees that year. After spending the 1979 season at Class A Fort Lauderdale, he was promoted to the Double-A Nashville Sounds in 1980. He reached Triple-A with the Columbus Clippers in 1981.

Borris was selected by the Minnesota Twins in the 1981 Rule 5 draft. He was subsequently returned to New York but then traded back to Minnesota with Ron Davis and Greg Gagne in exchange for Roy Smalley III on April 10, 1982. Borris began the 1982 season with the Triple-A Toledo Mud Hens but was promoted to the major league club to make his MLB debut on May 21. Borris made 23 relief appearances for the Twins pitching 49 2/3 innings and accumulating a 1–2 win–loss record with a 3.99 earned run average and 30 strikeouts. In 1983, he played for Triple-A Toledo and the Double-A Orlando Twins.

Borris played his last professional season with the Atlanta Braves' Triple-A Richmond Braves in 1984.
