= Larry Milbourne =

American baseball player (born 1951)

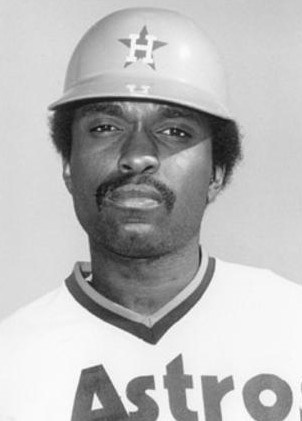
- Milbourne in 1976
- Infielder
- Born: February 14, 1951 (age 75); Port Norris, New Jersey, U.S.
- Batted: Switch Threw: Right

MLB debut
- April 6, 1974, for the Houston Astros

Last MLB appearance
- September 29, 1984, for the Seattle Mariners

MLB statistics
- Batting average: .254
- Home runs: 11
- Runs batted in: 184
- Stats at Baseball Reference

Teams
- Houston Astros (1974–1976); Seattle Mariners (1977–1980, 1984); New York Yankees (1981–1982, 1983); Minnesota Twins (1982); Cleveland Indians (1982); Philadelphia Phillies (1983)

Career highlights and awards
- 1974 Topps All-Star Rookie Team

Lawrence William Milbourne (born February 14, 1951) is an American former professional baseball utility infielder whose career spanned 15 seasons, 11 of which were spent in Major League Baseball (MLB) with the Houston Astros (1974–76), Seattle Mariners (1977–1980, 1984), New York Yankees (1981–82, 1983), Minnesota Twins (1982), Cleveland Indians (1982), and Philadelphia Phillies (1983).

Although Milbourne spent most of his big league career playing second base, he also played shortstop, third base, and left field. Milbourne compiled a career MLB batting average of .254, with 71 doubles, 24 triples, 11 home runs, and 184 runs batted in (RBI), in 989 games played. During his playing days, he stood 6 feet (1.8 m) tall, weighing 161 pounds (73 kg). Milbourne was a switch hitter who threw right-handed.

== Early life ==
Milbourne was born on February 14, 1951, in the Port Norris section of Commercial Township, New Jersey. He attended and played baseball at Millville Senior High School in New Jersey from which he graduated in 1969. His batting average improved from .263 as a sophomore to .439 as a senior. He attended Cumberland County College in Vineland, New Jersey.

== Professional career ==
=== Early career ===
On June 18, 1969, Milbourne signed as an amateur free agent with the Baltimore Orioles. Baltimore assigned him to their rookie-level minor league affiliate, the Bluefield Orioles of the Appalachian League. With Bluefield that season, Milbourne batted .305 with 75 hits, 10 doubles, six triples, and four home runs in 68 games played. Defensively, he played shortstop. On April 7, 1970, he was released by Baltimore. At the start of the 1971 season, after being out of professional baseball for a season, Milbourne was signed by the San Francisco Giants. The Giants assigned him to their Class-A affiliate, the Decatur Commodores of the Midwest League. In 123 games with the Commodores that season, he batted .301 with 69 runs scored, 156 hits, 23 doubles, five triples, five home runs, 38 runs batted in (RBIs), and 21 stolen bases. In the field, Milbourne primarily played second base, but also saw limited time at shortstop and third base. He led the league in hits, plate appearances (543), and at-bats (518) that season.

At the end of the 1971 season, Milbourne was selected by the California Angels in the minor league draft. During the 1972 season, Milbourne played his first and only season in the Angels organization. He was assigned to the Double-A Shreveport Captains of the Texas League. He batted .264 with 110 hits, 14 doubles, five triples, and two home runs in 122 games played that year. On defense, he only played second base. After the season, Milbourne was again selected in the minor league draft, this time by the St. Louis Cardinals. In 1973, the Cardinals assigned him to the Triple-A Tulsa Oilers, where he batted .283 with 104 hits, 13 doubles, six triples, and five home runs in 111 games played. The Cardinals added Milbourne to their 40-man roster after the season.

=== Houston Astros ===
Milbourne was selected by the Houston Astros from the Tulsa Oilers in the Rule 5 draft on December 3, 1973. He started the season with the Astros in 1974. On April 6, against the San Francisco Giants, Milbourne made his Major League Baseball (MLB) debut, but did not make a plate appearance. His offensive debut came on April 9, against the San Diego Padres, where he went hitless in one at-bat. Milbourne got his first MLB hit on April 11, against the Padres. In his first major league season, Milbourne batted .279 with 31 runs scored, 38 hits, two doubles, one triple, and nine RBIs in 112 games played. In the field, he played 87 games at second base, eight games at shortstop, and four games in left field. After the season, Milbourne was named to the Topps All-Star Rookie Team.

At the start of spring training in 1975, Milbourne failed to report to the Houston Astros, and his whereabouts were unknown. However, he did eventually report and made his season debut on April 8, against the Atlanta Braves. On September 23, in a game against the Cincinnati Reds, Milbourne hit his first career MLB home run. That season, Milbourne batted .212 with 17 runs scored, 32 hits, one double, two triples, one home run, and nine RBIs in 73 games played. Defensively, Milbourne was positioned at second base for 43 games, and 22 at shortstop. He also played in 24 games in the minor leagues that season with the Astros Triple-A affiliate, the Iowa Oaks. With the Oaks, Milbourne batted .221 with nine runs scored, 17 hits, three doubles, one triple, one home run, and six RBIs in 86 at-bats. He made the Astros major league roster out of spring training in 1976. On May 2, 1976, in the first game of a doubleheader against the New York Mets, Milbourne hit a game-winning single in the ninth inning. In the majors that year, he batted .248 with 22 runs scored, 36 hits, four doubles, and seven RBIs in 59 games played. In the field, he played exclusively at second base. In June 1976, Milbourne was optioned to the minor leagues. In the minors that season, he played with the Triple-A Memphis Blues, batting .325 with 45 runs scored, 95 hits, 12 doubles, two triples, five home runs, 31 RBIs, and 12 stolen bases in 71 games played.

=== Seattle Mariners ===
On March 30, 1977, the Seattle Mariners acquired Milbourne from the Houston Astros in exchange for Roy Thomas. Milbourne delivered the Mariners first game-winning hit on April 8, 1977. During the 1977 season, he batted .219 with 24 runs scored, 53 hits, 10 doubles, two home runs, and 21 RBIs in 86 games played. On defense, he played 41 games at second base, 40 games at shortstop, and one game at third base. He also played one game as the Mariners designated hitter. He again made the Mariners roster in 1978. Milbourne commented on his role as the Mariners utility infielder that year by saying, "I know it's my role to fill in. [...] I'd prefer to play more". On August 3, Milbourne got another game-winning hit, this time against the Minnesota Twins. On the season, he batted .226 with 31 runs scored, 53 hits, six doubles, two triples, two home runs, and 20 RBIs in 93 games played. Milbourne played 32 games at third base, 23 games at shortstop, and 15 games at second base. In 10 games that season, Seattle used Milbourne as the designated hitter.

In 1979, Milbourne made the Mariners Opening Day roster for the third consecutive season. In 123 games played that year, he batted .278 with 40 runs scored, 99 hits, 13 doubles, four triples, two home runs, and 26 RBIs. Defensively, Milbourne played 65 games at shortstop, 49 at second base, and 11 at third base.

=== Later career ===
In November 1980, the Seattle Mariners traded him to the New York Yankees for Brad Gulden and $150,000. In 61 games he hit. 313 with 12 runs batted in in 1981, and in 14 games in 1982 hit .148 before being dealt, (along with John Pacella and Pete Filson), to the Twins for Butch Wynegar and Roger Erickson on May 12. A few months after, the Twins traded him to the Cleveland Indians. After the 1982 season, the Indians sold him to the Philadelphia Phillies, who sold him back to the Yankees in 1983. After the 1983 season, the Yankees traded him back to the Mariners. Seattle released him following the 1984 season, and Milbourne subsequently retired.

== See also ==
- Houston Astros award winners and league leaders
