= John Pacella =

American baseball player (born 1956)

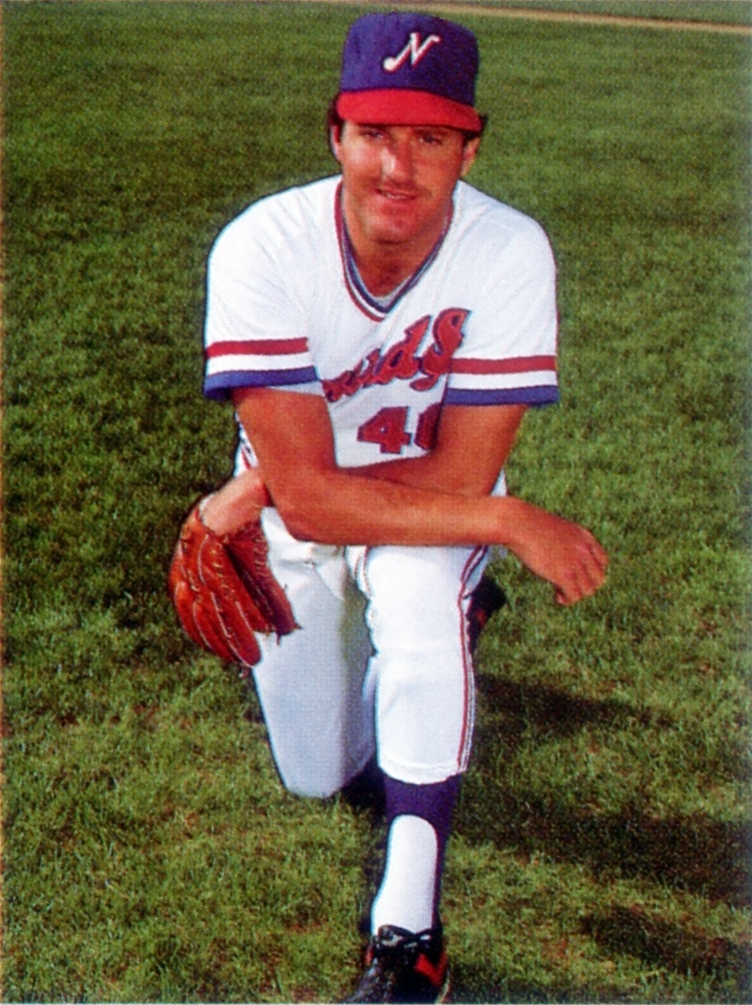
- Pacella with the Nashville Sounds in 1985
- Pitcher
- Born: September 15, 1956 (age 69); Brooklyn, New York, U.S.
- Batted: Right Threw: Right

MLB debut
- September 15, 1977, for the New York Mets

Last MLB appearance
- July 12, 1986, for the Detroit Tigers

MLB statistics
- Win–loss record: 4–10
- Earned run average: 5.73
- Strikeouts: 116
- Stats at Baseball Reference

Teams
- New York Mets (1977, 1979–1980); New York Yankees (1982); Minnesota Twins (1982); Baltimore Orioles (1984); Detroit Tigers (1986)

John Lewis Pacella (born September 15, 1956) is an American former Major League Baseball pitcher. He became known for his unusual delivery that sometimes caused him to lose his cap after a pitch.

== Background ==
Born in Brooklyn, New York, Pacella moved to Long Island in 1965. After going 21-4 in three seasons at Connetquot High School in Bohemia, he was drafted by the New York Mets in the fourth round of the 1974 Major League Baseball draft. He was 32-35 with a 3.78 earned run average over four seasons in their farm system when he was called to the majors in 1977.

== Major League career ==
He made his major league debut out of the bullpen on his 21st birthday against the Philadelphia Phillies. After retiring the side in the seventh inning, Pacella walked the first batter of the eighth, Ted Sizemore. A botched pick off attempt allowed Sizemore to move to second, from where he stole third. An error by Mets shortstop Doug Flynn allowed Ron Reed to reach first. Larry Bowa then drove Sizemore in with a single, while Reed advanced to third and later scored on wild pitch by Pacella, who escaped without allowing an earned run. He made two more appearances that season, each time pitching one perfect inning.

After spending all of 1978 in the minors, he returned to the Mets in 1979 as a September call-up. After pitching well in his first two appearances, he failed to make it out of the first inning in his third. For the season, he went 0-2 with a 4.41 ERA in four games.

His only full season in the majors was 1980. After starting the season in the bullpen, he was moved into the starting rotation in June. He earned his first major league win against Steve Carlton and the Phillies on June 27, and improved to 3-0 with a 3.43 ERA on July 17 when he and Jeff Reardon combined to shut the Atlanta Braves out. Unfortunately, things went south from there as Pacella lost his next four decisions and finished the season at 3-4 with a 5.14 ERA. After the season, he and infielder José Moreno were traded to the San Diego Padres for 1976 Cy Young Award winner Randy Jones. The following spring, the Padres dealt Pacella and Jerry Mumphrey to the New York Yankees for Ruppert Jones, Joe Lefebvre, Tim Lollar and Chris Welsh.

After spending the 1981 season in Triple A, Pacella won a job in the Yankees' bullpen out of spring training 1982. He made three appearances, getting hit hard in each, before being reassigned to Triple A Columbus. Shortly after his arrival in Columbus, he was dealt along with Larry Milbourne and Pete Filson from the Yankees to the Minnesota Twins for Butch Wynegar and Roger Erickson on May 12, 1982.

He reported directly to the Twins, and remained with the club for the rest of the season despite a high 7.32 ERA. On November 1, he was traded to the Texas Rangers for Len Whitehouse. He failed to make the club out of spring training, and was released just as the 1983 season was set to begin.

During the season, he signed a minor league deal with the Baltimore Orioles. He earned a September call-up to the big league club in September 1984, but was released at the end of the season. Shortly afterwards, he signed with the Detroit Tigers. He appeared briefly with the Tigers in the middle of the 1986 season. During the 1987 season, his contract was sold to the Yokohama Bay Stars of the Japanese Central League.

== Post-playing career ==
Pacella is a pitching instructor at Big League Baseball School in Ohio.
