= Roger Erickson (baseball) =

American baseball player (born 1956)

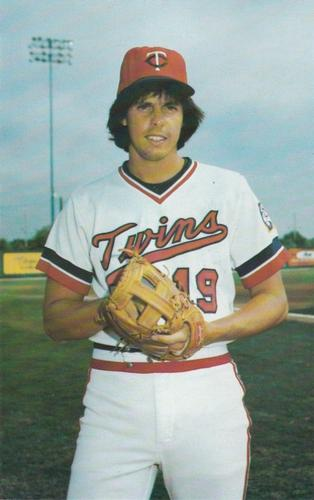
- Pitcher
- Born: August 30, 1956 (age 70); Springfield, Illinois, U.S.
- Batted: Right Threw: Right

MLB debut
- April 6, 1978, for the Minnesota Twins

Last MLB appearance
- September 26, 1983, for the New York Yankees

MLB statistics
- Win–loss record: 35–53
- Earned run average: 4.13
- Strikeouts: 365
- Stats at Baseball Reference

Teams
- Minnesota Twins (1978–1982); New York Yankees (1982–1983)

Roger Farrell Erickson (born August 30, 1956) is an American former professional baseball pitcher who played in Major League Baseball from 1978–1983 for the Minnesota Twins and New York Yankees. Born in Springfield, Illinois, he threw and batted right-handed, stood 6 feet 3 inches (1.91 m) tall and weighed 180 pounds (82 kg).

== Career ==
Erickson was selected by the Twins in the third round of the 1977 amateur draft after pitching for the University of New Orleans. In his first pro season, Erickson put up an 8–4 record and a 1.98 earned run average in Double-A. The following year, he made his major league debut on April 6, 1978, starting and going 61/3 innings to earn a 5–4 win over the Seattle Mariners. He finished his rookie season with 14 wins and a .519 winning percentage, second highest on the pitching staff.

However, from 1979 through 1981, pitching for a succession of poor Minnesota teams, he went a cumulative 13–31 in 70 games, with an ERA of 4.10. In 1982, he began the year by posting a 4–3 (4.87) record in seven starts. Then he was traded along with Butch Wynegar to the Yankees for Larry Milbourne, John Pacella and Pete Filson on May 12. The defending American League champion Bombers were experiencing a bumpy defense of their title, employing five pitching coaches and winning only 79 games all season. Erickson worked in only 16 games for New York, then went on the injured list with a sore shoulder. He returned to the active roster in 1983, but pitched in only five games, all in relief, for the Yanks in early and late-season trials, spending the bulk of the year at Triple-A. On September 26, 1983, Erickson hurled 22/3 innings in middle relief against the Cleveland Indians, and allowed four earned runs on three hits and three bases on balls. It was his last MLB appearance. He was traded to the Kansas City Royals during the off-season but was released; he pitched in the Detroit Tigers and St. Louis Cardinals systems, as well as with unaffiliated minor-league teams in the California and Mexican Leagues before leaving pro ball in 1987.

Erickson posted a 35–53 career record and a 4.13 earned run average, with 24 complete games in 117 starts and one save coming out of the bullpen. In 135 career games and 7991/3 innings pitched, he allowed 868 hits and 251 walks, with 365 strikeouts.
