= Greg Gagne (baseball) =

American baseball player (born 1961)

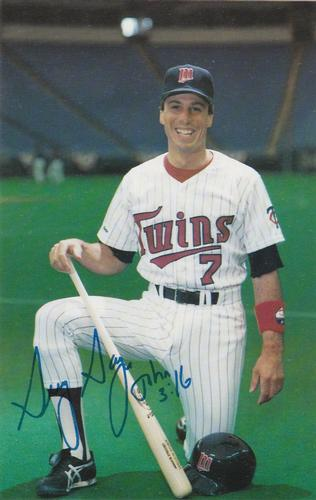
- Gagne in 1987
- Shortstop
- Born: November 12, 1961 (age 64); Fall River, Massachusetts, U.S.
- Batted: Right Threw: Right

MLB debut
- June 5, 1983, for the Minnesota Twins

Last MLB appearance
- September 27, 1997, for the Los Angeles Dodgers

MLB statistics
- Batting average: .254
- Home runs: 111
- Runs batted in: 604
- Stats at Baseball Reference

Teams
- Minnesota Twins (1983–1992); Kansas City Royals (1993–1995); Los Angeles Dodgers (1996–1997)

Career highlights and awards
- 2× World Series champion (1987, 1991); Minnesota Twins Hall of Fame

Gregory Carpenter Gagne (/ˈɡæɡniː/ GAG-nee; born November 12, 1961) is an American former professional baseball shortstop. He played in Major League Baseball for the Minnesota Twins, Kansas City Royals, and Los Angeles Dodgers. He most notably played 10 seasons for the Twins from 1983 to 1992, including both of the franchise's World Series championship teams in 1987 and 1991. He was considered one of the American League's best defensive shortstops during his time with Minnesota.

== Playing career ==
Greg Gagne was drafted by the New York Yankees in the fifth round of the 1979 Major League Baseball draft and spent the next three seasons in the Yankees' minor league system before being traded to the Twins on April 10, 1982, along with starting pitcher Paul Boris and reliever Ron Davis for the Twins starting shortstop, Roy Smalley. Gagne spent all of 1982 and all but 12 games of the 1983 and 1984 seasons in the minors before earning the starting shortstop job in 1985, after which Gagne became a fixture of the Twins' infield for the next eight seasons.

On October 4, 1986, during a Twins' home game at the Hubert H. Humphrey Metrodome, Gagne hit two inside-the-park home runs against the Chicago White Sox. Both home runs were hit off Chicago starting pitcher Floyd Bannister. The Twins went on to win the game, 7–3.

Gagne was a fixture of the Twins drive to their second World Series appearance, and first World Series title, following the 1987 season. During the Twins march to their second World Series crown in four years, Gagne hit a game-winning, three-run homer in Game One of the 1991 World Series off Atlanta's Charlie Leibrandt. Gagne hit only .213 during the Twins two post-season drives. Despite this low batting average, Gagne hit five doubles and four home runs, along with knocking in 10 runs and scoring 12 times, to maximize those 18 hits.

Gagne left the Twins when his contract was up in the 1992 season; the team had put a great deal of resources into re-signing superstar Kirby Puckett (inking the star centerfielder to a then huge multi-year contract that would pay him $5.3 million in 1993) and with Gagne's replacement, Pat Meares, already on the Major League roster, did not offer Gagne the salary increase that he was looking for. Gagne then signed with the Kansas City Royals, agreeing to a three-year, $10.6 million contract. Following three years with the Royals in which he put up similar numbers as he had with the Twins, he again entered free agency and signed a contract to play for the Los Angeles Dodgers for the 1996 and 1997 seasons. Gagne retired from baseball following the end of the 1997 season.

== Career statistics ==
Years	Games	PA	AB	R	H	2B	3B	HR	RBI	SB	BB	SO	AVG	OBP	SLG	FLD%
15	1798	6209	5673	712	1440	296	50	111	604	108	367	1121	.254	.302	.382	.972

In 27 postseason games, including the 1987 and '91 World Series, Gagne batted .220 (22-for-100) with 14 runs, 4 home runs and 10 RBI.

== Retirement ==
During his tenure with the Twins, Gagne lived in Eden Prairie, Minnesota. He currently lives in Somerset, Massachusetts, and is the former head baseball coach at Bishop Feehan High School.

Gagne was a guest at the Metrodome farewell ceremony. During that day's game he sat in the broadcast booth with commentators Dick Bremer and Bert Blyleven for a half inning. On February 8, 2010, Gagne was elected to the Twins Hall of Fame and was inducted at Target Field on September 4, 2010.
