= Ron Davis (pitcher) =

American baseball player (born 1955)

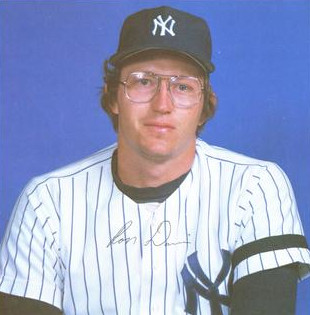
- Davis in 1981
- Pitcher
- Born: August 6, 1955 (age 70); Houston, Texas, U.S.
- Batted: Right Threw: Right

Professional debut
- MLB: July 29, 1978, for the New York Yankees
- NPB: June 3, 1989, for the Yakult Swallows

Last appearance
- MLB: September 24, 1988, for the San Francisco Giants
- NPB: October 13, 1989, for the Yakult Swallows

MLB statistics
- Win–loss record: 47–53
- Earned run average: 4.05
- Strikeouts: 597
- Saves: 130

NPB statistics
- Win–loss record: 4–5
- Earned run average: 3.97
- Strikeouts: 34
- Saves: 7
- Stats at Baseball Reference

Teams
- New York Yankees (1978–1981); Minnesota Twins (1982–1986); Chicago Cubs (1986–1987); Los Angeles Dodgers (1987); San Francisco Giants (1988); Yakult Swallows (1989)

Career highlights and awards
- All-Star (1981)

Ronald Gene Davis (born August 6, 1955) is an American former Major League Baseball pitcher who played 11 years from 1978 to 1988. Davis played for the New York Yankees and Minnesota Twins of the American League and the Chicago Cubs, Los Angeles Dodgers, and San Francisco Giants of the National League. He was selected to the American League All-Star team in 1981.

Davis is one of only five players (and the most recent as of 2025) to have 14 blown saves in a season, which he did in 1984; the others are Bob Stanley (1983), Bruce Sutter (1978), Rollie Fingers (1976), and Gerry Staley (1960).

== Life and career ==
Davis was born in Houston, Texas. Standing 6' 4", he was a hard-throwing right-handed relief pitcher. During his career he appeared in 481 games all in relief, and recorded 130 saves.

Originally drafted by the Chicago Cubs, he was traded while still in the minor leagues to the New York Yankees in 1978. While in New York he was used as the team's closer after an injury to All-Star relief pitcher Rich Gossage from a fight with teammate Cliff Johnson. Also, while with the Yankees, he was one of the first pitchers ever to be used exclusively as a middle-inning "set-up" pitcher for his team's closer. For two seasons, 1980 and 1981, Davis and Gossage were an effective tandem, and many teams have followed this pitching formula to this day.

Davis still holds the Yankee team record for most consecutive strikeouts in a single game with eight, recorded on May 4, 1981, against the California Angels. This accomplishment also gives him the team record for most strikeouts by a relief pitcher in a single game. The record was tied by Michael King on April 22, 2022, when he struck out 8 of 9 batters in relief.

During the 1981 Major League Baseball strike, Davis worked as a waiter at a restaurant of the Hyatt Regency Hotel in Kansas City. Two of the hotel's overhead walkways collapsed on July 18, killing 114 people. It was reported by the media that Davis helped in the subsequent rescue efforts.

In April 1982, Davis was traded to the Minnesota Twins, along with Greg Gagne, and Paul Boris in exchange for Roy Smalley. Among Twins fans, with whom he came to be known as Ron "Boom-Boom" Davis, his name is still synonymous with ineffective relief pitching, despite finishing in the top five for saves in the American League in three of his five seasons with the team. In 1984, he then tied the record for blown saves in a single season with 14. No one since has blown this many saves in a single season. In 1986, his last year with the Twins, Davis began the year with two saves in April. These would be the last saves of his career. He gave up his first runs of that season in a game against the California Angels. After hitting the first batter he faced, Davis eventually loaded the bases and allowed the game-tying run to score by throwing a wild pitch. In the bottom of the ninth, he then gave up a three-run home run to lose the game. In another game that year against the Boston Red Sox, he came on in a save situation in the ninth inning. After getting his first two batters out, he loaded the bases and then issued a walk to force in the tying run. He then hit the next batter with a pitch to force in the winning run. With that loss, Davis lost his closer's role and was later traded to the Chicago Cubs in mid-season. He was used sparingly in relief the rest of his career.

Davis pitched for the Sun City Rays of the short-lived Senior Professional Baseball Association in 1990.

== Personal life ==
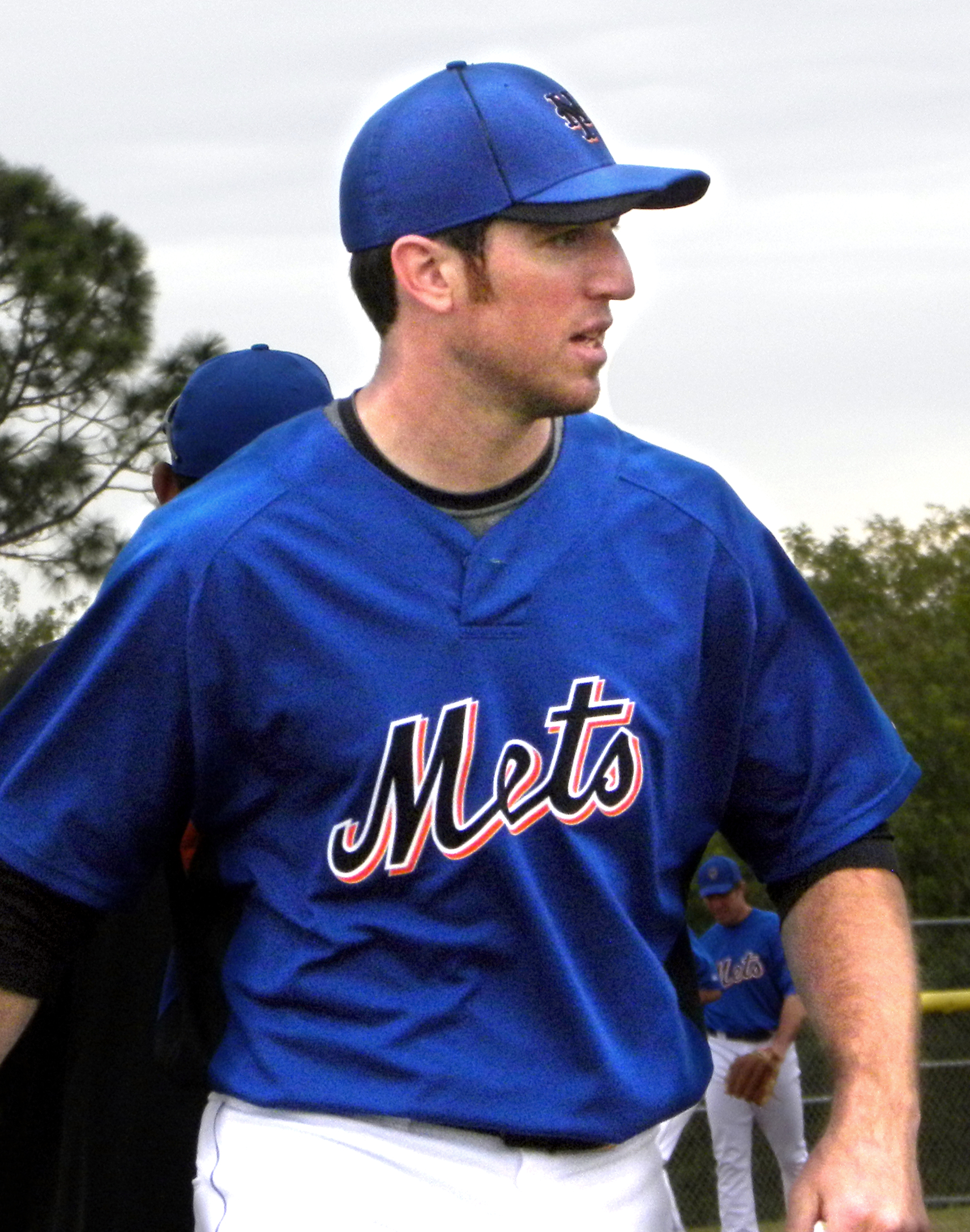
Davis's son Ike, while playing for the New York Mets

Davis's son, Ike Davis, was selected in the first round, number 18 overall, by the New York Mets in the 2008 MLB draft. When Ike was a youth, he attended a five-day baseball fundamentals camp run by his father for children ages 5–14, and Ron was Ike's little league coach until Ike was 14. He would throw at his son in batting practice in high school.

In April 2010, Ike debuted in the major leagues for the Mets. Davis and his son are the 197th father-son combination to have both played in the major leagues.
