= 1980 Minnesota Twins season =

1980 Minnesota Twins
- League: American League
- Division: West
- Ballpark: Metropolitan Stadium
- City: Bloomington, Minnesota
- Record: 77–84 (.478)
- Divisional place: 3rd
- Owners: Calvin Griffith (majority owner, with Thelma Griffith Haynes)
- General managers: Calvin Griffith
- Managers: Gene Mauch, Johnny Goryl
- Television: KMSP-TV (Bob Kurtz, Larry Osterman)
- Radio: 830 WCCO AM (Herb Carneal, Frank Quilici)

The 1980 Minnesota Twins season was the 20th season for the Minnesota Twins franchise in the Twin Cities of Minnesota, their 20th season at Metropolitan Stadium and the 80th overall in the American League. The Twins finished 77–84, third in the American League West. 769,206 fans attended Twins games, the lowest total in the American League.

== Offseason ==
- December 3, 1979: 1979 rule 5 draft
  - Doug Corbett was drafted by the Twins from the Cincinnati Reds.
  - Guy Sularz was drafted by the Twins from the San Francisco Giants.
- December 5, 1979: Jeff Holly was traded by the Twins to the Detroit Tigers for Fernando Arroyo.
- January 6, 1980: Albert Williams was signed as a free agent by the Twins.

== Regular season ==
On May 31, outfielder Ken Landreaux went 0 for 4, ending his hitting streak at 31 games. This set a Minnesota Twins record that has yet to be topped.

Landreaux tripled three times July 3, in a 10–3 win over the Texas Rangers, to tie an American League record. This Twins record remained untouched until Denard Span matched it on June 29, 2010.

Landreaux, a Los Angeles native, is the only Twins player to make the All-Star Game at Dodger Stadium.

One of the club's most unusual games was played in Toronto on Thursday, August 28, a game in which one player was replaced after being injured in a car crash during the game and that featured a rare save by a Twins starting pitcher. A game that ended with the Blue Jays' mound ace playing left field. The Canadian National Exhibition (like a state fair) was set up adjacent to Exhibition Stadium. Because of a schedule evening concert by the rock group The Cars, no inning would be able to start past 5:00 PM; the game was begun at 1:00 PM to avoid the curfew. However, the game went into extra innings and was suspended in the 15th inning, to be finished the following afternoon. During the evening hours Thursday, Bombo Rivera was injured in a car crash with Toronto's Otto Velez and neither could resume playing Friday. Friday's scheduled starter Dave Stieb played left field for the final inning of the Thursday game when the Jays ran out of position players (he'd go on to lose the Friday game). Minnesota's John Verhoeven got the win, and starter Albert Williams, who faced four batters in the fifteenth inning, got the save.

On September 18, at Milwaukee for a double-header, outfielder Gary Ward hit a double, single, homer and triple in the first game, becoming the sixth Twin to hit for the cycle. It came, however, in a losing effort as the 9–8 win by the Brewers was the only time—of the ten Minnesota cycles—that Minnesota has lost the game in which a Twin cycled. Ward became part of history in 2004 when, on May 26, his son Daryle Ward hit for the cycle for Pittsburgh, and they became the only father-son duo to accomplish the feat.

Infielder John Castino led the team in most of the major offensive categories, batting .302 with 13 HR and 64 RBI. Shortstop Roy Smalley hit 12 HR and collected 63 RBI. Ken Landreaux batted .281 with 7 HR and 62 RBI.

Reliever Doug Corbett replaced Mike Marshall as manager Gene Mauch's all-purpose reliever, racking up 8 relief wins along with 23 saves. His saves total set a major league rookie record. Only veterans Jerry Koosman (16–13) and Geoff Zahn (14–18) had double digit wins.

=== Season standings ===
AL West
Team	W	L	Pct.	GB	Home	Road
Kansas City Royals	97	65	.599	—	49‍–‍32	48‍–‍33
Oakland Athletics	83	79	.512	14	46‍–‍35	37‍–‍44
Minnesota Twins	77	84	.478	19½	44‍–‍36	33‍–‍48
Texas Rangers	76	85	.472	20½	39‍–‍41	37‍–‍44
Chicago White Sox	70	90	.438	26	37‍–‍42	33‍–‍48
California Angels	65	95	.406	31	30‍–‍51	35‍–‍44
Seattle Mariners	59	103	.364	38	36‍–‍45	23‍–‍58

=== Record vs. opponents ===
1980 American League record Sources:
Team	BAL	BOS	CAL	CWS	CLE	DET	KC	MIL	MIN	NYY	OAK	SEA	TEX	TOR
Baltimore	—	8–5	10–2	6–6	6–7	10–3	6–6	7–6	10–2	7–6	7–5	6–6	6–6	11–2
Boston	5–8	—	9–3	6–4	7–6	8–5	5–7	6–7	6–6	3–10	9–3	7–5	5–7	7–6
California	2–10	3–9	—	3–10	4–6	5–7	5–8	6–6	7–6	2–10	3–10	11–2	11–2	3–9
Chicago	6–6	4–6	10–3	—	5–7	2–10	5–8	5–7	5–8	5–7	6–7	6–7	6–7–2	5–7
Cleveland	7–6	6–7	6–4	7–5	—	3–10	5–7	3–10	9–3	5–8	6–6	8–4	6–6	8–5
Detroit	3–10	5–8	7–5	10–2	10–3	—	2–10	7–6	6–6	5–8	6–6	10–2–1	4–8	9–4
Kansas City	6–6	7–5	8–5	8–5	7–5	10–2	—	6–6	5–8	8–4	6–7	7–6	10–3	9–3
Milwaukee	6–7	7–6	6–6	7–5	10–3	6–7	6–6	—	7–5	5–8	7–5	9–3	5–7	5–8
Minnesota	2–10	6–6	6–7	8–5	3–9	6–6	8–5	5–7	—	4–8	6–7	7–6	9–3	7–5
New York	6–7	10–3	10–2	7–5	8–5	8–5	4–8	8–5	8–4	—	8–4	9–3	7–5	10–3
Oakland	5–7	3–9	10–3	7–6	6–6	6–6	7–6	5–7	7–6	4–8	—	8–5	7–6	8–4
Seattle	6–6	5–7	2–11	7–6	4–8	2–10–1	6–7	3–9	6–7	3–9	5–8	—	4–9	6–6
Texas	6–6	7–5	2–11	7–6–2	6–6	8–4	3–10	7–5	3–9	5–7	6–7	9–4	—	7–5
Toronto	2–11	6–7	9–3	7–5	5–8	4–9	3–9	8–5	5–7	3–10	4–8	6–6	5–7	—

=== Notable transactions ===
- April 1, 1980: Guy Sularz was returned by the Twins to the San Francisco Giants.
- April 3, 1980: Paul Hartzell was released by the Twins.
- April 3, 1980: Bob Randall was released by the Twins.
- May 16, 1980: Bob Randall was signed as a free agent by the Twins.
- June 3, 1980: Bob Randall was released by the Twins.
- June 6, 1980: Mike Marshall was released by the Twins.
- June 18, 1980: Bob Randall was signed as a free agent by the Twins.
- July 16, 1980: Bob Randall was released by the Twins.

=== Roster ===
1980 Minnesota Twins
Roster
Pitchers: 30 Fernando Arroyo; 27 Mike Bacsik; 23 Doug Corbett; 19 Roger Erickson; 21 Terry Felton; 15,31 Darrell Jackson; 35 Mike Kinnunen; 36 Jerry Koosman; 28 Mike Marshall; 17 Pete Redfern; 22 John Verhoeven; 20 Bob Veselic; 27,28 Albert Williams; 38 Geoff Zahn	Catchers: 11 Sal Butera; 16 Butch Wynegar; Infielders: 1 John Castino; 26 Mike Cubbage; 12,21 Lenny Faedo; 25 Danny Goodwin; 15 Ron Jackson; 14 Pete Mackanin; 34 José Morales; 32 Bob Randall; 5 Roy Smalley; 1 Jesús Vega; 7 Rob Wilfong	Outfielders: 8 Glenn Adams; 33 Dave Edwards; 18 Greg Johnston; 44 Ken Landreaux; 24 Willie Norwood; 10 Hosken Powell; 9 Bombo Rivera; 12 Rick Sofield; 35 Gary Ward	Manager: 45 Johnny Goryl; 4 Gene Mauch; Coaches: 45 Johnny Goryl; 41 Karl Kuehl; 42 Camilo Pascual; 32 Bob Randall; 43 Jerry Zimmerman

== Player stats ==
= Indicates team leader

=== Batting ===
==== Starters by position ====
Note: Pos = Position; G = Games played; AB = At bats; H = Hits; Avg. = Batting average; HR = Home runs; RBI = Runs batted in

Pos	Player	G	AB	H	Avg.	HR	RBI
C	Butch Wynegar	146	486	124	.255	5	57
1B	Ron Jackson	131	396	105	.265	5	42
2B	Rob Wilfong	131	416	103	.248	8	45
3B	John Castino	150	546	165	.302	13	64
SS	Roy Smalley	133	486	135	.278	12	63
CF	Ken Landreaux	129	484	136	.281	7	62
RF	Hosken Powell	137	485	127	.262	6	35
DH	Glenn Adams	99	262	75	.286	6	38

==== Other batters ====
Note: G = Games played; AB = At bats; H = Hits; Avg. = Batting average; HR = Home runs; RBI = Runs batted in

Player	G	AB	H	Avg.	HR	RBI
Pete Mackanin	108	319	85	.266	4	35
Mike Cubbage	103	285	70	.246	8	42
José Morales	97	241	73	.303	8	36
Dave Edwards	81	200	50	.250	2	20
Danny Goodwin	55	115	23	.200	1	11
Bombo Rivera	44	113	25	.221	3	10
Sal Butera	34	85	23	.271	0	2
Willie Norwood	34	73	12	.164	1	8
Gary Ward	13	41	19	.463	1	10
Jesús Vega	12	30	5	.167	0	4
Greg Johnston	14	27	5	.185	0	1
Bob Randall	5	15	3	.200	0	0
Lenny Faedo	5	8	2	.250	0	0

=== Pitching ===
==== Starting pitchers ====
Note: G = Games pitched; IP = Innings pitched; W = Wins; L = Losses; ERA = Earned run average; SO = Strikeouts

Player	G	IP	W	L	ERA	SO
Jerry Koosman	38	243.1	16	13	4.03	149
Geoff Zahn	38	232.2	14	18	4.41	96
Roger Erickson	32	191.1	7	13	3.25	97
Darrell Jackson	32	172.0	9	9	3.87	90
Terry Felton	5	17.2	0	3	7.13	14

==== Other pitchers ====
Note: G = Games pitched; IP = Innings pitched; W = Wins; L = Losses; ERA = Earned run average; SO = Strikeouts

Player	G	IP	W	L	ERA	SO
Pete Redfern	23	104.2	7	7	4.56	73
Fernando Arroyo	21	92.1	6	6	4.68	27
Albert Williams	18	77.0	6	2	3.51	35

==== Relief pitchers ====
Note: G = Games pitched; W = Wins; L = Losses; SV = Saves; ERA = Earned run average; SO = Strikeouts

Player	G	W	L	SV	ERA	SO
Doug Corbett	73	8	6	23	1.98	29
John Verhoeven	44	3	4	0	3.97	42
Mike Kinnunen	21	0	0	0	5.11	8
Mike Marshall	18	1	3	1	6.12	13
Mike Bacsik	10	0	0	0	4.30	9
Bob Veselic	1	0	0	0	4.50	2

== Farm system ==
Level	Team	League	Manager
AAA	Toledo Mud Hens	International League	Cal Ermer
AA	Orlando Twins	Southern League	Roy McMillan
A	Visalia Oaks	California League	Tom Kelly
A	Wisconsin Rapids Twins	Midwest League	Rick Stelmaszek
Rookie	Elizabethton Twins	Appalachian League	Fred Waters
