= 1979 Minnesota Twins season =

1979 Minnesota Twins
- League: American League
- Division: West
- Ballpark: Metropolitan Stadium
- City: Bloomington, Minnesota
- Record: 82–80 (.506)
- Divisional place: 4th
- Owners: Calvin Griffith (majority owner, with Thelma Griffith Haynes)
- General managers: Calvin Griffith
- Managers: Gene Mauch
- Television: KMSP-TV (Bob Kurtz, Larry Osterman)
- Radio: 830 WCCO AM (Herb Carneal, Joe McConnell)

The 1979 Minnesota Twins season was the 19th season for the Minnesota Twins franchise in the Twin Cities of Minnesota, their 19th season at Metropolitan Stadium and the 79th overall in the American League. The team finished 82–80, fourth in the American League West.

== Offseason ==
In January 1979, the Twins attempted to trade first baseman Rod Carew to the New York Yankees in exchange for Chris Chambliss, Juan Beníquez, Dámaso García, and Dave Righetti, but were unable to finalize a deal. Carew would instead be traded to the California Angels on February 3.

=== Notable transactions ===
- October 3, 1978: Dave Johnson was released by the Twins.
- December 4, 1978: Dan Ford was traded by the Twins to the California Angels for Ron Jackson and Danny Goodwin.
- December 8, 1978: Greg Field (minors) and a player to be named later were traded by the Twins to the New York Mets for Jerry Koosman. The Twins completed the deal by sending Jesse Orosco to the Mets on February 7, 1979.
- January 6, 1979: Mike Marshall was signed as a free agent by the Twins.
- February 3, 1979: Rod Carew was traded by the Twins to the California Angels for Ken Landreaux, Dave Engle, Paul Hartzell, and Brad Havens.

== Regular season ==
Three Minnesota Twins homered in the May 15 win over Texas, the sixteenth straight Minnesota game with at least one Twins homer. The streak will end on May 16. Nine players homered 28 times during the club's record-setting streak.

Only one Twins player made the All-Star Game: shortstop Roy Smalley. Smalley hit 24 HR, drove in 95 runs, and scored 85 runs, all team-leading totals. Ken Landreaux, acquired in the Carew trade, batted .305 with 15 HR and 83 RBI. Ron Jackson, acquired in the Dan Ford trade, hit 14 HR and collected 68 RBI.

Reliever Mike Marshall continued as manager Gene Mauch's all-purpose reliever, pitching in a league-leading 90 games, racking up 10 relief wins along with a league-leading 32 saves. Veteran Jerry Koosman won 20 games. Dave Goltz (14–13) and Geoff Zahn (13–7) had double-digit wins.

Smalley turned 144 double plays this year, setting a major league record for shortstops. The team total of 203 double plays set a new season record.

Third baseman John Castino shared the AL Rookie of the Year award with Alfredo Griffin of the Toronto Blue Jays. Each received 7 first place votes.

1,070,521 fans attended Twins games, the fourth lowest total in the American League. It was only the second time since 1970 the team attracted over one million fans.

=== Season standings ===
AL West
Team	W	L	Pct.	GB	Home	Road
California Angels	88	74	.543	—	49‍–‍32	39‍–‍42
Kansas City Royals	85	77	.525	3	46‍–‍35	39‍–‍42
Texas Rangers	83	79	.512	5	44‍–‍37	39‍–‍42
Minnesota Twins	82	80	.506	6	39‍–‍42	43‍–‍38
Chicago White Sox	73	87	.456	14	33‍–‍46	40‍–‍41
Seattle Mariners	67	95	.414	21	36‍–‍45	31‍–‍50
Oakland Athletics	54	108	.333	34	31‍–‍50	23‍–‍58

=== Record vs. opponents ===
1979 American League record Sources:
Team	BAL	BOS	CAL	CWS	CLE	DET	KC	MIL	MIN	NYY	OAK	SEA	TEX	TOR
Baltimore	—	8–5	9–3	8–3	8–5	7–6	6–6	8–5	8–4	5–6	8–4	10–2	6–6	11–2
Boston	5–8	—	5–7	5–6	6–7	8–5	8–4	8–4	9–3	5–8	9–3	8–4	6–6	9–4
California	3–9	7–5	—	9–4	6–6	4–8	7–6	7–5	9–4	7–5	10–3	7–6	5–8	7–5
Chicago	3–8	6–5	4–9	—	6–6	3–9	5–8	5–7	5–8	4–8	9–4	5–8	11–2	7–5
Cleveland	5–8	7–6	6–6	6–6	—	6–6	6–6	4–9	8–4	5–8	8–4	7–5	5–7	8–5
Detroit	6–7	5–8	8–4	9–3	6–6	—	5–7	6–7	4–8	7–6	7–5	7–5	6–6	9–4
Kansas City	6–6	4–8	6–7	8–5	6–6	7–5	—	5–7	7–6	5–7	9–4	7–6	6–7	9–3
Milwaukee	5–8	4–8	5–7	7–5	9–4	7–6	7–5	—	8–4	9–4	6–6	9–3	9–3	10–3
Minnesota	4–8	3–9	4–9	8–5	4–8	8–4	6–7	4–8	—	7–5	9–4	10–3	4–9	11–1
New York	6–5	8–5	5–7	8–4	8–5	6–7	7–5	4–9	5–7	—	9–3	6–6	8–4	9–4
Oakland	4–8	3–9	3–10	4–9	4–8	5–7	4–9	6–6	4–9	3–9	—	8–5	2–11	4–8
Seattle	2–10	4–8	6–7	8–5	5–7	5–7	6–7	3–9	3–10	6–6	5–8	—	6–7	8–4
Texas	6–6	6–6	8–5	2–11	7–5	6–6	7–6	3–9	9–4	4–8	11–2	7–6	—	7–5
Toronto	2–11	4–9	5–7	5–7	5–8	4–9	3–9	3–10	1–11	4–9	8–4	4–8	5–7	—

=== Notable transactions ===
- June 5, 1979: 1979 Major League Baseball draft
  - Randy Bush was drafted by the Twins in the 2nd round.
  - Mike Kinnunen was drafted by the Twins in the 10th round.
- June 29, 1979: Rudy Meoli was purchased by the Twins from the Philadelphia Phillies.
- July 25, 1979: Craig Kusick was purchased from the Twins by the Toronto Blue Jays.

=== Roster ===
1979 Minnesota Twins
Roster
Pitchers: 27 Mike Bacsik; 31 Ken Brett; 19 Roger Erickson; 21 Terry Felton; 30 Dave Goltz; 18 Paul Hartzell; 21 Jeff Holly; 15,31 Darrell Jackson; 36 Jerry Koosman; 28 Mike Marshall; 17 Pete Redfern; 20 Gary Serum; 40 Kevin Stanfield; 23 Paul Thormodsgard; 38 Geoff Zahn	Catchers: 14 Glenn Borgmann; 16 Butch Wynegar; Infielders: 1 John Castino; 26 Mike Cubbage; 25 Danny Goodwin; 15 Ron Jackson; 22 Craig Kusick; 34 José Morales; 32 Bob Randall; 5 Roy Smalley; 7 Rob Wilfong	Outfielders: 8 Glenn Adams; 33 Dave Edwards; 44 Ken Landreaux; 24 Willie Norwood; 10 Hosken Powell; 9 Bombo Rivera; 25,12 Rick Sofield; 35 Gary Ward; Other batters: 37 Dan Graham; 37 Jesús Vega	Manager: 4 Gene Mauch; Coaches: 45 Johnny Goryl; 41 Karl Kuehl; 42 Camilo Pascual; 43 Jerry Zimmerman

== Player stats ==
= Indicates team leader

=== Batting ===
==== Starters by position ====
Note: Pos = Position; G = Games played; AB = At bats; H = Hits; Avg. = Batting average; HR = Home runs; RBI = Runs batted in

Pos	Player	G	AB	H	Avg.	HR	RBI
C	Butch Wynegar	149	504	136	.270	7	57
1B	Ron Jackson	159	583	158	.271	14	68
2B	Rob Wilfong	140	419	131	.313	9	59
SS	Roy Smalley	162	621	168	.271	24	95
3B	John Castino	148	393	112	.285	5	52
LF	Bombo Rivera	112	263	74	.281	2	31
CF	Ken Landreaux	151	564	172	.305	15	83
RF	Hosken Powell	104	338	99	.293	2	36
DH	José Morales	92	191	51	.267	2	27

==== Other batters ====
Note: G = Games played; AB = At bats; H = Hits; Avg. = Batting average; HR = Home runs; RBI = Runs batted in

Player	G	AB	H	Avg.	HR	RBI
Glenn Adams	119	326	98	.301	8	50
Willie Norwood	76	270	67	.248	6	30
Mike Cubbage	94	243	67	.276	2	23
Dave Edwards	96	229	57	.249	8	35
Bob Randall	80	199	49	.246	0	14
Danny Goodwin	58	159	46	.289	5	27
Rick Sofield	35	93	28	.301	0	12
Glenn Borgmann	31	70	14	.200	0	8
Craig Kusick	24	54	13	.241	3	6
Gary Ward	10	14	4	.286	0	1
Jesús Vega	4	7	0	.000	0	0
Dan Graham	2	4	0	.000	0	0

=== Pitching ===
= Indicates league leader

==== Starting pitchers ====
Note: G = Games pitched; IP = Innings pitched; W = Wins; L = Losses; ERA = Earned run average; SO = Strikeouts

Player	G	IP	W	L	ERA	SO
Jerry Koosman	37	263.2	20	13	3.38	157
Dave Goltz	36	250.2	14	13	4.16	132
Geoff Zahn	26	169.0	13	7	3.57	58
Paul Hartzell	28	163.0	6	10	5.36	44
Roger Erickson	24	123.0	3	10	5.63	47

==== Other pitchers ====
Note: G = Games pitched; IP = Innings pitched; W = Wins; L = Losses; ERA = Earned run average; SO = Strikeouts

Player	G	IP	W	L	ERA	SO
Pete Redfern	40	108.1	7	3	3.49	85
Darrell Jackson	24	69.1	4	4	4.28	43
Gary Serum	20	64.0	1	3	6.61	31

==== Relief pitchers ====
Note: G = Games pitched; W = Wins; L = Losses; SV = Saves; ERA = Earned run average; SO = Strikeouts

Player	G	W	L	SV	ERA	SO
Mike Marshall	90	10	15	32	2.65	81
Mike Bacsik	31	4	2	0	4.39	33
Ken Brett	9	0	0	0	4.97	3
Jeff Holly	6	0	0	0	7.11	5
Kevin Stanfield	3	0	0	0	6.00	1
Terry Felton	1	0	0	0	0.00	1
Paul Thormodsgard	1	0	0	0	9.00	1

== Farm system ==
Level	Team	League	Manager
AAA	Toledo Mud Hens	International League	Cal Ermer
AA	Orlando Twins	Southern League	Roy McMillan
A	Visalia Oaks	California League	Tom Kelly
A	Wisconsin Rapids Twins	Midwest League	Rick Stelmaszek
Rookie	Elizabethton Twins	Appalachian League	Fred Waters
