= 1983 Minnesota Twins season =

1983 Minnesota Twins
- League: American League
- Division: West
- Ballpark: Hubert H. Humphrey Metrodome
- City: Minneapolis, Minnesota
- Record: 70–92 (.432)
- Divisional place: 5th
- Owners: Calvin Griffith (majority owner, with Thelma Griffith Haynes)
- General managers: Calvin Griffith
- Managers: Billy Gardner
- Television: KMSP-TV (Bob Kurtz, Larry Osterman); Spectrum (Pat Hughes, Dick Bremer)
- Radio: 830 WCCO AM (Herb Carneal, Ron Weber, Tim Moreland)

The 1983 Minnesota Twins season was the 23rd season for the Minnesota Twins franchise in the Twin Cities of Minnesota, their 2nd season at Hubert H. Humphrey Metrodome and the 83rd overall in the American League.

The Twins finished 70–92, tied for fifth in the American League West, and improved upon their dismal 60–102 record from 1982 by ten games. 858,939 fans attended Twins games, the third-lowest total in the American League.

== Offseason ==
- January 12, 1983: Bob Veselic was traded by the Twins to the Houston Astros for Rick Lysander.
- January 31, 1983: Mike Hart was signed as a free agent by the Twins.
- March 25, 1983: Sal Butera was traded by the Twins to the Detroit Tigers for Stine Poole (minors) and cash.
- March 25, 1983: Pete Redfern was released by the Twins.

== Regular season ==
Only one Twins player made the All-Star Game, outfielder Gary Ward.

=== Offense ===
- Kent Hrbek hit .297 with 16 HR and 84 RBI.
- Gary Ward hit .278 with 19 HR and 88 RBI.
- Gary Gaetti hit 21 HR and 78 RBI.
- Tom Brunansky hit 28 HR and 82 RBI.

Team Leaders
Statistic	Player	Quantity
HR	Tom Brunansky	28
RBI	Gary Ward	92
BA	Kent Hrbek	.297
Runs	John Castino	83

=== Pitching ===
Starter Ken Schrom was 15–8. Reliever Ron Davis had 30 saves.

Team Leaders
Statistic	Player	Quantity
ERA	Ken Schrom	3.71
Wins	Ken Schrom	15
Saves	Ron Davis	30
Strikeouts	Frank Viola	127

=== Season standings ===
AL West
Team	W	L	Pct.	GB	Home	Road
Chicago White Sox	99	63	.611	—	55‍–‍26	44‍–‍37
Kansas City Royals	79	83	.488	20	45‍–‍36	34‍–‍47
Texas Rangers	77	85	.475	22	44‍–‍37	33‍–‍48
Oakland Athletics	74	88	.457	25	42‍–‍39	32‍–‍49
California Angels	70	92	.432	29	35‍–‍46	35‍–‍46
Minnesota Twins	70	92	.432	29	37‍–‍44	33‍–‍48
Seattle Mariners	60	102	.370	39	30‍–‍51	30‍–‍51

=== Record vs. opponents ===
1983 American League record Sources:
Team	BAL	BOS	CAL	CWS	CLE	DET	KC	MIL	MIN	NYY	OAK	SEA	TEX	TOR
Baltimore	—	8–5	7–5	7–5	6–7	5–8	8–4	11–2	8–4	6–7	8–4	8–4	9–3	7–6
Boston	5–8	—	6–6	6–6	7–6	4–9	5–7	4–9	5–7	7–6	8–4	7–5	7–5	7–6
California	5–7	6–6	—	3–10	8–4	4–8	6–7	6–6	6–7	5–7	5–8	6–7	6–7	4–8
Chicago	5–7	6–6	10–3	—	8–4	8–4	9–4	4–8	8–5	8–4	8–5	12–1	8–5	5–7
Cleveland	7–6	6–7	4–8	4–8	—	5–8	7–5	3–10	6–6	6–7	7–5	8–4	3–9	4–9
Detroit	8–5	9–4	8–4	4–8	8–5	—	7–5	6–7	9–3	5–8	6–6	8–4	8–4	6–7
Kansas City	4–8	7–5	7–6	4–9	5–7	5–7	—	6–6	6–7	6–6	7–6	8–5	8–5–1	6–6
Milwaukee	2–11	9–4	6–6	8–4	10–3	7–6	6–6	—	8–4	4–9	6–6	5–7	8–4	8–5
Minnesota	4–8	7–5	7–6	5–8	6–6	3–9	7–6	4–8	—	4–8	4–9	9–4	5–8	5–7
New York	7–6	6–7	7–5	4–8	7–6	8–5	6–6	9–4	8–4	—	8–4	7–5	7–5	7–6
Oakland	4–8	4–8	8–5	5–8	5–7	6–6	6–7	6–6	9–4	4–8	—	9–4	2–11	6–6
Seattle	4–8	5–7	7–6	1–12	4–8	4–8	5–8	7–5	4–9	5–7	4–9	—	6–7	4–8
Texas	3–9	5–7	7–6	5–8	9–3	4–8	5–8–1	4–8	8–5	5–7	11–2	7–6	—	4–8
Toronto	6–7	6–7	8–4	7–5	9–4	7–6	6–6	5–8	7–5	6–7	6–6	8–4	8–4	—

=== Notable transactions ===
- May 12, 1983: Tom Klawitter was signed as a free agent by the Twins.
- June 6, 1983: Tim Belcher was drafted by the Twins in the 1st round (1st pick) of the 1983 Major League Baseball draft, but did not sign.

=== Roster ===
1983 Minnesota Twins
Roster
Pitchers: 37 Bobby Castillo; 39 Ron Davis; 23 Pete Filson; 27 Brad Havens; 21 Jim Lewis; 19 Rick Lysander; 33 Jack O'Connor; 17 Bryan Oelkers; 35 Jay Pettibone; 18 Ken Schrom; 16 Frank Viola; 30 Mike Walters; 22 Len Whitehouse; 28 Albert Williams	Catchers: 20 Dave Engle; 15 Tim Laudner; 5 Ray Smith; Infielders: 2 John Castino; 12 Lenny Faedo; 8 Gary Gaetti; 31 Greg Gagne; 14 Kent Hrbek; 1 Houston Jimenez; 11 Tim Teufel; 7 Scott Ullger; 38 Ron Washington	Outfielders: 26 Darrell Brown; 24 Tom Brunansky; 4 Jim Eisenreich; 9 Mickey Hatcher; 11 Rusty Kuntz; 10 Bobby Mitchell; 32 Gary Ward; 12 Tack Wilson; Other batters: 25 Randy Bush	Manager: 42 Billy Gardner; Coaches: 41 Tom Kelly; 44 Jim Lemon; 46 Johnny Podres; 45 Jim Shellenback; 43 Rick Stelmaszek

== Player stats ==
=== Batting ===
==== Starters by position ====
Note: Pos = Position; G = Games played; AB = At bats; H = Hits; Avg. = Batting average; HR = Home runs; RBI = Runs batted in

Pos	Player	G	AB	H	Avg.	HR	RBI
C	Dave Engle	120	374	114	.305	8	43
1B	Kent Hrbek	141	515	153	.297	16	84
2B	John Castino	142	563	156	.277	11	57
SS	Ron Washington	99	317	78	.246	4	26
3B	Gary Gaetti	157	584	143	.245	21	78
LF	Gary Ward	157	623	173	.278	19	88
CF	Darrell Brown	91	309	84	.272	0	22
RF	Tom Brunansky	151	542	123	.227	28	82
DH	Randy Bush	124	373	93	.249	11	56

==== Other batters ====
Note: G = Games played; AB = At bats; H = Hits; Avg. = Batting average; HR = Home runs; RBI = Runs batted in

Player	G	AB	H	Avg.	HR	RBI
Mickey Hatcher	106	375	119	.317	9	47
Lenny Faedo	51	173	48	.277	1	18
Tim Laudner	62	168	31	.185	6	18
Bobby Mitchell	59	152	35	.230	1	15
Ray Smith	59	152	34	.224	0	8
Rusty Kuntz	31	100	19	.190	3	5
Houston Jiménez	36	86	15	.174	0	9
Scott Ullger	35	79	15	.190	0	5
Tim Teufel	21	78	24	.308	3	6
Greg Gagne	10	27	3	.111	0	3
Jim Eisenreich	2	7	2	.286	0	0
Tack Wilson	5	4	1	.250	0	1

=== Pitching ===
==== Starting pitchers ====
Note: G = Games pitched; IP = Innings pitched; W = Wins; L = Losses; ERA = Earned run average; SO = Strikeouts

Player	G	IP	W	L	ERA	SO
Frank Viola	35	210.0	7	15	5.49	127
Ken Schrom	33	196.1	15	8	3.71	80
Albert Williams	36	193.1	11	14	4.14	68
Bobby Castillo	27	158.1	8	12	4.77	90
Brad Havens	16	80.1	5	8	8.18	40
Jay Pettibone	4	27.0	0	4	5.33	10

==== Other pitchers ====
Note: G = Games pitched; IP = Innings pitched; W = Wins; L = Losses; ERA = Earned run average; SO = Strikeouts

Player	G	IP	W	L	ERA	SO
Pete Filson	26	90.0	4	1	3.40	49
Jack O'Connor	27	83.0	2	3	5.86	56
Bryan Oelkers	10	34.1	0	5	8.65	13

==== Relief pitchers ====
Note: G = Games pitched; W = Wins; L = Losses; SV = Saves; ERA = Earned run average; SO = Strikeouts

Player	G	W	L	SV	ERA	SO
Ron Davis	66	5	8	30	3.34	84
Rick Lysander	61	5	12	3	3.38	58
Len Whitehouse	60	7	1	2	4.15	44
Mike Walters	23	1	1	2	4.12	21
Jim Lewis	6	0	0	0	6.50	8

== Farm system ==
Level	Team	League	Manager
AAA	Toledo Mud Hens	International League	Cal Ermer
AA	Orlando Twins	Southern League	Phil Roof
A	Visalia Oaks	California League	Harry Warner
A	Wisconsin Rapids Twins	Midwest League	Charlie Manuel
Rookie	Elizabethton Twins	Appalachian League	Fred Waters
