= Witter Field =

Baseball park in Wood County, Wisconsin, United States

Coordinates: 44.385493°N 89.820621°W

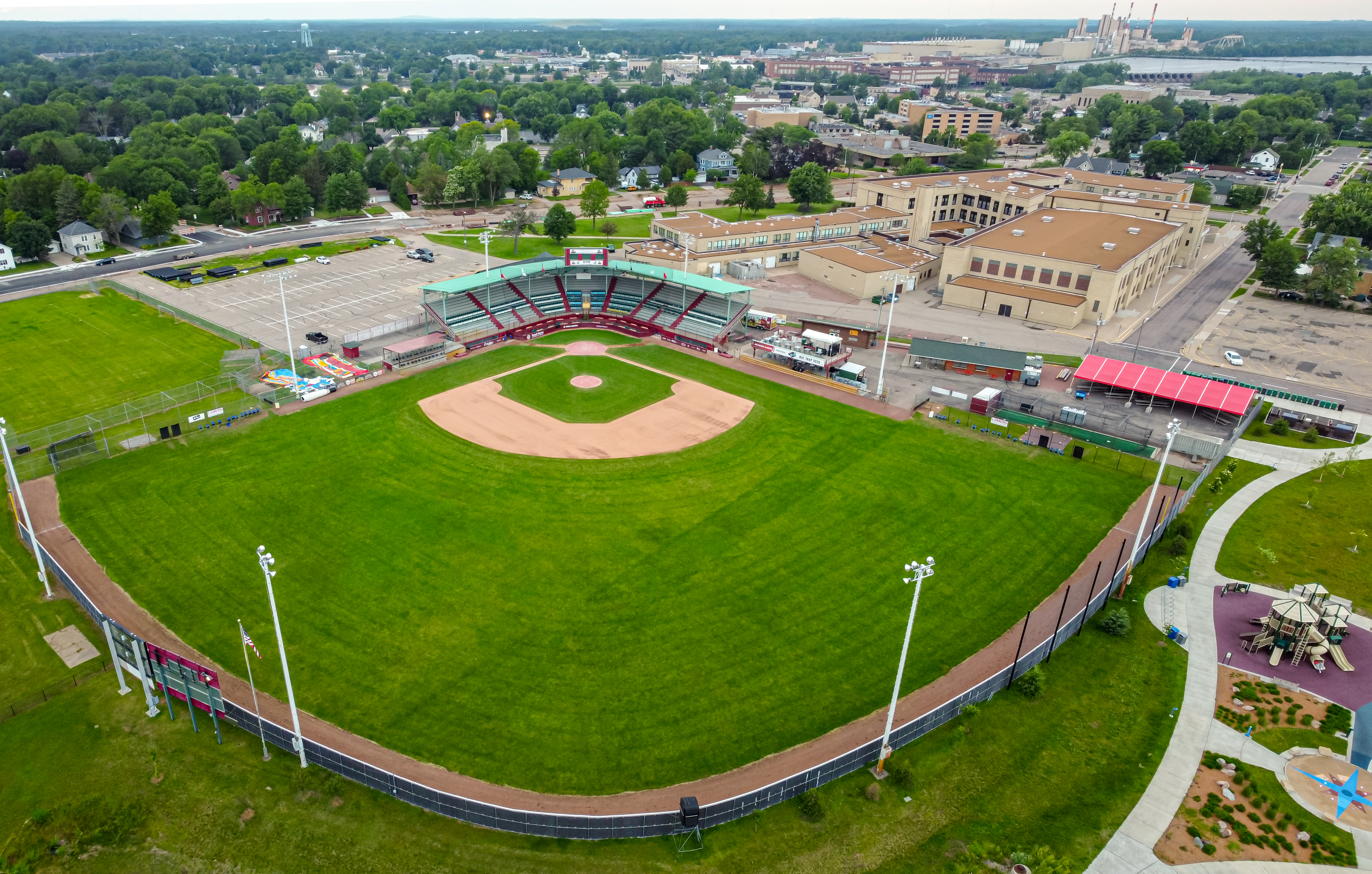
- Interactive map of Witter Field
- Former names: Lincoln Athletic Field
- Location: 521 Lincoln St, Wisconsin Rapids, WI 54494
- Owner: Wisconsin Rapids
- Capacity: 4,000 (1941); 3,000 (1983); 1,588 (current)
- Surface: Grass
- Field size: (LF-CF-RF): 320-385-320 320 L, 375 C, 320 R (current)

Construction
- Built: 1928
- Opened: 1928
- Renovated: 1950, 2010

Tenants
- Wisconsin Rapids White Sox (WSL) 1941–42; 1946–53; Wisconsin Rapids Senators (MWL) 1963; Wisconsin Rapids Twins (MWL) 1964–1983; Wisconsin Rapids Rafters (NWL) 2010–present

Witter Field is a ballpark located at 521 Lincoln Street in Wisconsin Rapids, Wisconsin, United States. It was built in 1928. It served as the home park for multiple minor league teams: the Wisconsin Rapids White Sox, Wisconsin Rapids Senators and Wisconsin Rapids Twins. Currently, it hosts the Northwoods League's Wisconsin Rapids Rafters and youth teams.

== Witter Field History ==
The ballpark was home to the Wisconsin Rapids White Sox (1941–42; 1946–53) of the Class-D Wisconsin State League. The League folded after the 1953 season, leaving Witter without professional baseball until a new team in the Class-A Midwest League started play. The Wisconsin Rapids Senators (1963) and Wisconsin Rapids Twins (1964-1983) would play for the next two decades. Following the 1983 season, the franchise moved to Simmons Field in Kenosha, Wisconsin.

In 2010, baseball returned, as the current tenant, the Wisconsin Rapids Rafters of the summer collegiate Northwoods League began play in June, 2010.

The park was built in 1928 and dedicated in 1934. The site housed the Lincoln High School facility, beginning in 1902 and the field was called "Lincoln Athletic Field" until 1940 when it became "Witter Field" in honor of Isaac Witter.

The wooden grandstand bleachers were replaced in 1950. 227 seats from the demolished Milwaukee County Stadium were installed in 2010.

From 2005-2008 Witter Field hosted the youth WIAC state baseball tournament.

On July 18, 2011, Witter Field hosted the Northwoods League All-Star Game. Baseball Hall of Fame inductee Paul Molitor was present for All-Star festivities.

== The site today ==
It is currently the home to local High School baseball, Legion Baseball and hosts the Northwoods League's Wisconsin Rapids Rafters.

The site also contains the Wisconsin Rapids Recreation Complex featuring the Wisconsin Rapids Aquatic Center, tennis courts, pickleball courts, ice skating, a warming house, a football field and a skate park.

== Notable players ==
The park has hosted numerous Major League alumni, some of note include:

- Ben Heller (2012)
- Paul Molitor (1977) Appeared in games at stadium as member of the Burlington Bees
- Allan Anderson (1983) List of Major League Baseball annual ERA leaders; 1988 AL ERA Leader
- Mark Davidson (1982–83)
- Mark Portugal (1982)
- Rich Yett (1981)
- Jim Eisenreich (1980–81) 15 MLB Seasons; First Recipient of Tony Conigliaro Award
- Gary Gaetti (1980) gg; 4 x GG; 2 x MLB AS; 1987 ALCS MVP
- Kent Hrbek (1980) MLB AS
- Rick Stelmaszek (1978-80 MGR)
- Bud Bulling (1975–76)
- John Castino (1976) 1979 AL Rookie of the Year
- Rick Sofield (1976) MLB Player, Coach
- Jerry Garvin (1974)
- Gary Ward (1974) 2 x MLB AS
- Alvis Woods (1974)
- Randy Bass (1973)
- Tom Johnson (1972)
- Glenn Borgmann (1971)
- Bill Campbell (1971) MLB AS; 1977 AL Saves Leader
- Jim Hughes (1971)
- Dave McKay (1971) MLB Player/Coach
- Johnny Goryl (1970, 1973–75, MGR) MLB MGR
- Steve Barber (1969) 2 x MLB AS
- Rick Dempsey (1968–69) 1983 World Series MVP
- Bill Zepp (1968)
- Steve Braun (1967)
- Tom Hall (1967)
- Charlie Manual (1967, MGR 1983) MLB MGR: 1000 wins; MGR: 2008 World Series Champion - Philadelphia Phillies
- Graig Nettles (1966) 2 x GG; 6 x MLB AS 1976 AL Home Run Leader;1981 ALCS MVP
- George Mitterwald (1965, 1968)
- Pat Kelly (1964) MLB AS
- Jim French (1963)
- Wayne Terwilliger (1963, MGR)
- Johnny Schaive (1953)
- Jim Landis (1952) 5 x GG in CF; 2 x MLB AS
- Glen Stewart (1949)
- Bill Fischer (1942)
- Cy Buker (1942)
- Max Patkin (1941) Long Time baseball entertainer, featured in Bull Durham; 1988 King of Baseball
