= Jay Ward (baseball) =

American baseball player (1938–2012)

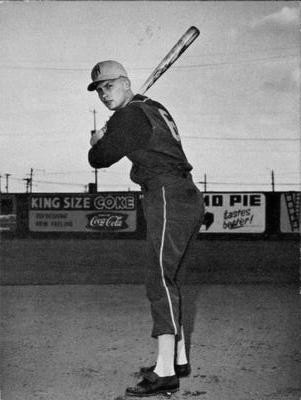
- Ward in 1961
- Infielder
- Born: September 9, 1938; Brookfield, Missouri, U.S.
- Died: February 24, 2012 (aged 73); Kalispell, Montana, U.S.
- Batted: Right Threw: Right

MLB debut
- May 6, 1963, for the Minnesota Twins

Last MLB appearance
- June 7, 1970, for the Cincinnati Reds

MLB statistics
- At-bats: 49
- Hits: 8
- Batting average: .163

NPB statistics
- Batting average: .238
- Home runs: 14
- Runs batted in: 41
- Stats at Baseball Reference

Teams
- As player: Minnesota Twins (1963–1964); Chunichi Dragons (1966); Cincinnati Reds (1970); As coach: New York Yankees (1987); Montreal Expos (1991–1992)

John Francis "Jay" Ward (September 9, 1938 – February 24, 2012) was an American professional baseball player and coach. He was also a manager in the minor leagues.

== Early life ==
Ward was born on September 9, 1938, in Brookfield, Missouri, to John and Francis Ward. He graduated from Highland High School in Highland, Illinois, in 1956.

== Playing career ==
Ward signed with the New York Yankees in 1956. In his first professional season with the Kearney Yankees of the Nebraska State League, Ward batted .331 with seven home runs and earned All-League honors. Two of those seven home runs were grand slams hit in consecutive innings on August 17.

He was plucked from the Yankees' farm system in the 1958 minor league draft by the Kansas City Athletics. It was as a member of their organization that Ward put together his finest minor league season. As a member of the Southern Association's Shreveport Sports in 1959, Ward batted .257 with 22 home runs and 84 runs batted in.

At the 1961 winter meetings, he was dealt to the Los Angeles Dodgers with Stan Johnson and Bobby Prescott for Bill Lajoie and Gordie Windhorn. Though Johnson and Prescott both had major league experience, only Ward and Windhorn would ever make a major league appearance after this deal. Midway through his first season in the Dodgers organization, he was dealt to the Minnesota Twins for Bert Cueto.

A spring training injury to starting third baseman Rich Rollins opened the door for Ward to join the Twins early in the 1963 season. His first major league hit was a two-run double off Orlando Pena to lead the Twins to a 2–0 victory over Kansas City. It would be his only hit of the season, and he would be returned to the Dallas-Fort Worth Rangers in mid-June.

He would return to the Twins as a September call-up the following season, and batted .226 in 12 games.

It would be six more years before Ward would return to the majors. After a brief stint with the Nippon Professional Baseball league's Chunichi Dragons in 1966, and a season in the Cleveland Indians' farm system, Ward returned to the majors in 1970 as a member of the Cincinnati Reds. In five plate appearances, he drew two walks, but did not get a hit.

== Coaching ==
After one more season in the Kansas City Royals organization, Ward pulled the plug on his playing career and returned to the Minnesota Twins organization as manager of their Midwest League affiliate, the Wisconsin Rapids Twins. He managed the team to a 70–56 record, but decided to leave baseball for a while, and moved back to his home state, Missouri. When he returned to baseball, he joined the Philadelphia Phillies organization to manage their Northwest League affiliate, the Bend Phillies, in 1983 and the Spartanburg Suns in 1984.

He returned to the Cincinnati Reds organization in 1985 to manage the Cedar Rapids Reds. A year later, he managed the Vermont Reds to the Eastern League championship. Following the season, Lou Piniella brought him back to the majors and the organization he started with, naming him hitting coach for the New York Yankees. The 1987 Yankees batted .262, down from .271 the previous season, and after just one season with the Yankees, he was replaced by Chris Chambliss.

Ward returned to minor league managing in 1988 and 1989. He became the Montreal Expos' minor league hitting coordinator in 1990, and was made their major leagues hitting coach during the 1991 season.

From 1999 to 2001, Jay Ward was the first manager of the Québec Capitales of the Can-Am League. Credited for bringing credibility to the new club, he publicly feuded at times with popular players and fans.

== Later life ==
He retired to Troy, Montana, with his wife Lynn where he enjoyed hunting and fishing. He died at age 73 on February 24, 2012. Survivors included his wife Lynn; three daughters, 2 step daughters and one son and their spouses; 17 grandchildren; and one great-grandchild. He was preceded in death by one grandchild.

Preceded by Weldon Bowlin	Wisconsin Rapids Twins Manager; 1972	Succeeded by Johnny Goryl
Preceded by Roly de Armas	Bend Phillies Manager; 1983	Succeeded by Ramon Aviles
Preceded by first manager	Spartanburg Suns Manager; 1984	Succeeded by Roly de Armas
Preceded by Jim Lett	Cedar Rapids Reds Manager; 1985	Succeeded by Gene Dusan
Preceded by Jack Lind	Vermont Reds Manager; 1986	Succeeded by Tom Runnells
Preceded by Willie Horton	New York Yankees hitting coach 1987	Succeeded by Chris Chambliss
Preceded by Steve Demeter	Salem Buccaneers Manager; 1988	Succeeded by Rocky Bridges
Preceded by Mike Hargrove	Williamsport Bills Manager; 1989	Succeeded by Rich Morales
Preceded by Hal McRae	Montreal Expos hitting coach 1991–1992	Succeeded by Tommy Harper
