= Wisconsin Rapids Twins =

- 1963–1983; Wisconsin Rapids, Wisconsin

Minor league affiliations
- Class: Class A (1963–1983)
- League: Midwest League (1963–1983)

Major league affiliations
- Team: Minnesota Twins (1964–1983); Washington Senators (1963)

Minor league titles
- League titles (1): 1973
- Division titles (1): 1973
- First-half titles (1): 1967

Team data
- Name: Wisconsin Rapids Twins (1964–1983); Wisconsin Rapids Senators (1963)
- Ballpark: Witter Field (1963–1983)

The Wisconsin Rapids Twins were a Class A Minor League Baseball team that existed from 1963 to 1983, playing in the Midwest League. Affiliated with the Washington Senators (1963) and the Minnesota Twins (1964-1983), they were located in Wisconsin Rapids, Wisconsin, United States. They played their home games at Witter Field. The franchise evolved from the Wisconsin Rapids White Sox of the Wisconsin State League (1940–42, 1946–53). For the 1984 season, the franchise became the Kenosha Twins, moving to Kenosha, Wisconsin.

Despite the fact that they existed for 21 seasons, the Twins were Midwest League Champions only once, defeating the Danville Warriors 2 games to 1 and winning the 1973 Championship, after having lost to the Appleton Foxes in the 1967 Championship Series.

== Ballpark ==
They played their home games at Witter Field, located at 521 Lincoln Street in Wisconsin Rapids, Wisconsin. Built in 1928, it served as the home park for multiple minor league teams: the Wisconsin Rapids White Sox (1941–42; 1946–53) of the Class-D Wisconsin State League. The League folded after the 1953 season, leaving Witter without professional baseball until a new team in the Class-A Midwest League started play. The Wisconsin Rapids Senators (1963) and Wisconsin Rapids Twins (1964–1983) would play for the next two decades. Following the 1983 season, the franchise moved to Kenosha, Wisconsin and played as the Kenosha Twins.

Today, the park is home to the Wisconsin Rapids Rafters of the summer collegiate Northwoods League, who began play in 2010 .

== Notable alumni ==
The player to win the first Triple Crown in Midwest League history played for the Twins – Elmore "Moe" Hill. In 1974, he led the league with a .339 average, 32 home runs and 113 RBI.

- Allan Anderson (1983) 1988 AL ERA Leader
- Steve Barber (1969) 2 x MLB All-Star
- Randy Bass (1973)
- Steve Braun (1967)
- Bud Bulling (1975–76)
- Bill Campbell (1971) MLB All-Star; 1977 AL Saves Leader
- John Castino (1976) 1979 AL Rookie of the Year
- Rick Dempsey (1968–69) 1983 World Series MVP
- Jim Eisenreich (1980–81) First Recipient of Tony Conigliaro Award
- Gary Gaetti (1980) 2 x MLB All-Star
- Jerry Garvin (1974)
- Johnny Goryl (1970, 1973–75, MGR)
- Tom Hall (1967)
- Kent Hrbek (1980) MLB AS
- Pat Kelly (1964) MLB All-Star
- Dave McKay (1971)
- Charlie Manuel (1967, MGR 1983) Manager: 2008 World Series Champion - Philadelphia Phillies
- George Mitterwald (1965, 1968)
- Graig Nettles (1966) 6 x MLB All-Star 1976 AL Home Run Leader
- Mark Portugal (1982)
- Rick Stelmaszek (1978-80 MGR)
- Gary Ward (1974) 2 x MLB All-Star
- Alvis Woods (1974)

== Year-by-year record ==
Year	Record	Finish	Manager	Playoffs
1964	50-71	9th	Joe Christian	
1965	60-61	6th	Ray Bellino / Pete Appleton / Ray Bellino	none
1966	59-63	6th	Ray Bellino	
1967	70-46	2nd	Ray Bellino	Lost League Finals
1968	62-57	4th	Ray Bellino / Tom Umphlett	
1969	49-75	9th	Tom Videtich	none
1970	59-60	6th	Johnny Goryl	
1971	42-78	10th	Weldon Bowlin	
1972	70-56	4th	Jay Ward	Lost in 1st round
1973	68-53	2nd	Johnny Goryl	League Champs
1974	80-48	1st	Johnny Goryl	Lost in 1st round
1975	71-58	3rd	Johnny Goryl	
1976	67-63	5th	Harry Warner	
1977	66-72	6th	Jim Rantz / Carlos Pascual / Spencer Robbins	
1978	62-76	5th	Rick Stelmaszek	
1979	60-72	6th	Rick Stelmaszek	
1980	77-64	3rd	Rick Stelmaszek	Lost in 1st round
1981	68-65	4th	Ken Staples	
1982	56-82	11th	Ken Staples	
1983	71-67	5th (t)	Charlie Manuel	
