= Cavan Biggio =

American baseball player (born 1995)

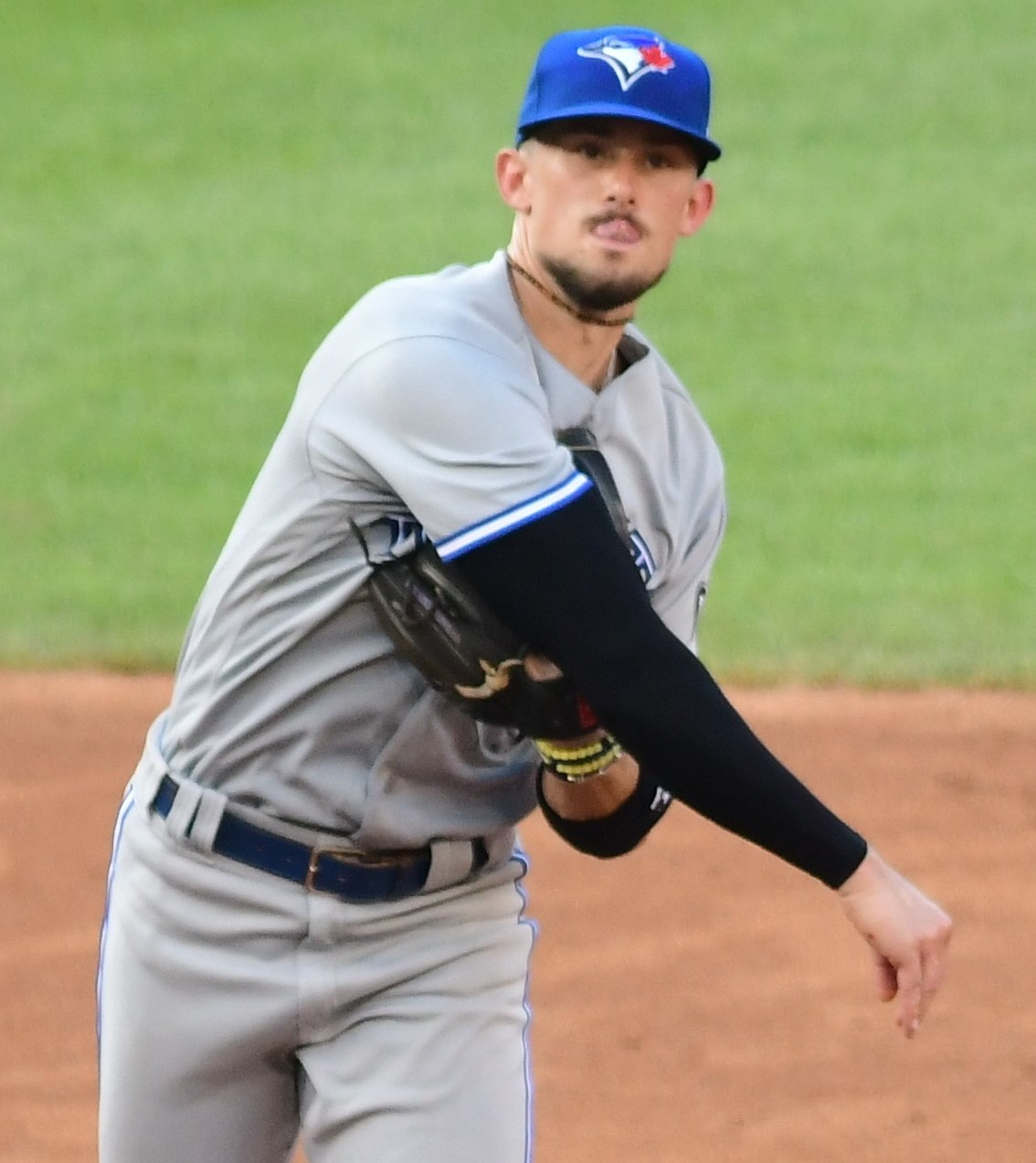
- Biggio with the Toronto Blue Jays in 2020

Free agent
- Utility player
- Born: April 11, 1995 (age 31); Houston, Texas, U.S.
- Bats: Left Throws: Right

MLB debut
- May 24, 2019, for the Toronto Blue Jays

MLB statistics (through 2025 season)
- Batting average: .223
- Home runs: 52
- Runs batted in: 190
- Stats at Baseball Reference

Teams
- Toronto Blue Jays (2019–2024); Los Angeles Dodgers (2024); Atlanta Braves (2024); Kansas City Royals (2025)
Medals
Men's baseball
Representing United States
18U Baseball World Championship
Gold medal – first place	2012 Seoul	Team

Cavan Thomas Biggio (/ˈkævɪn/ KAV-in; born April 11, 1995) is an American professional baseball utility player who is a free agent. He has previously played in Major League Baseball (MLB) for the Toronto Blue Jays, Los Angeles Dodgers, Atlanta Braves, and Kansas City Royals. He made his MLB debut in 2019. Biggio is the son of former MLB player and Hall of Famer Craig Biggio.

== Early life ==
Biggio is the son of Patricia and Craig Biggio, a former MLB second baseman and inductee of the National Baseball Hall of Fame. His given name comes from County Cavan in Ireland. He has a brother, Conor, and a sister, Quinn.

== Amateur career ==
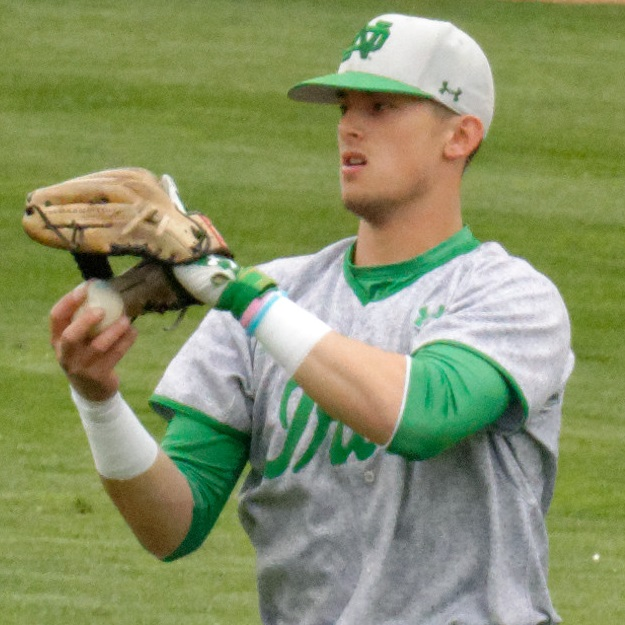
Biggio with Notre Dame in 2016

Biggio attended St. Thomas High School in Houston, Texas. He lettered four times in both baseball and football.

The Philadelphia Phillies selected Biggio in the 29th round of the 2013 Major League Baseball draft. He did not sign and chose to attend the University of Notre Dame. In three seasons of college baseball playing second base exclusively, with the Notre Dame Fighting Irish, Biggio batted .272 with 15 home runs, 70 runs batted in (RBIs), and 33 stolen bases. In 2014 (batting .203) and 2015 (batting .263), he played collegiate summer baseball with the Harwich Mariners of the Cape Cod Baseball League, and was named a league all-star in 2015.

== Professional career ==
=== Toronto Blue Jays ===
The Toronto Blue Jays selected Biggio in the fifth round of the 2016 Major League Baseball draft. He signed for the draft slot bonus of $300,000 on June 17, and was assigned to the Vancouver Canadians of the Low–A Northwest League. On July 26, Biggio was named an All-Star for Vancouver. He finished the 2016 season with the Lansing Lugnuts of the Single–A Midwest League. In 62 games, Biggio batted .273 with 26 RBI and 11 stolen bases. He also exhibited above-average plate discipline, walking 33 times while striking out 35 times.

Biggio played the entire 2017 season with the Dunedin Blue Jays of the High–A Florida State League, batting .233 with 11 home runs, 60 RBI, and 11 stolen bases. The Blue Jays assigned him to the New Hampshire Fisher Cats of the Double-A Eastern League for the 2018 season. There, Biggio was named the Eastern League's Rookie of the Year and Most Valuable Player while hitting .252 with 26 homers and 99 RBI. He began the 2019 season with the Buffalo Bisons of the Triple-A International League. Through his first 42 games with the Bisons, he hit .307 with six home runs.

On May 24, 2019, Biggio was called up to the Toronto Blue Jays. He made his major league debut that night versus the San Diego Padres, striking out twice and grounding out in his three at-bats. Two days later, on May 26, he got his first major league hit, off of Robbie Erlin of the Padres. In his next at bat that game, he hit his first home run off Matt Wisler. On September 17, Biggio hit for the cycle against the Baltimore Orioles at Oriole Park at Camden Yards, becoming the third player in Blue Jays history to accomplish the feat, following Jeff Frye in 2001 and Kelly Gruber in 1989. Biggio had four RBI, scored three runs, and stole two bases in the game. Cavan, alongside his father, Craig (who hit for the cycle for the Houston Astros on April 8, 2002), joined Gary Ward and his son Daryle as only the second father-and-son duo to hit for the cycle in MLB history. On the season, Biggio hit .235/.364/.429 with 16 home runs, 48 RBI, and 14 stolen bases in 100 games.

Overall, during the COVID-19 pandemic shortened 2020 season, Biggio batted .250/.375/.432 with eight home runs and 28 RBI in 59 games. In 2021 with the Blue Jays, he batted .224/.322/.356 with seven home runs and 27 RBI in 79 games. In Triple–A, Biggio batted .182 with three home runs and 11 RBI across 22 games. On March 22, 2022, he signed a $2.123 million contract with the Blue Jays, avoiding salary arbitration. He played in 97 games for the Blue Jays and slashed .202/.318/.350 with six home runs and 24 RBI.

On January 13, 2023, Biggio signed a one-year, $2.8 million contract with the Blue Jays, again avoiding salary arbitration. In 111 games for Toronto, he slashed .235/.340/.370 with nine home runs and 40 RBI.

Biggio played in 44 games for Toronto in 2024, hitting .200/.323/.291 with two home runs, nine RBI, and two stolen bases. On June 7, 2024, he was designated for assignment.

=== Los Angeles Dodgers ===
On June 12, 2024, the Blue Jays traded Biggio and cash considerations to the Los Angeles Dodgers for minor league pitcher Braydon Fisher. He played in 30 games for the Dodgers, batting .192 with three home runs and 10 RBI. Biggio was designated for assignment by the Dodgers on August 5 and was released on August 8.

=== San Francisco Giants ===
On August 23, 2024, Biggio signed a minor league contract with the San Francisco Giants. He played in 12 games for the Triple-A Sacramento River Cats, slashing .163/.413/.326 with two home runs, six RBI, and two stolen bases.

=== Atlanta Braves ===
On September 7, 2024, Biggio was traded to the Atlanta Braves for cash considerations. He played in one game for the Triple–A Gwinnett Stripers before he was added to the major league roster on September 11. In 4 games for Atlanta, Biggio went 1–for–5 (.200). On November 1, Biggio was removed from the 40–man roster and sent outright to Gwinnett, but rejected the assignment in favor of free agency.

=== Kansas City Royals ===
On January 5, 2025, Biggio signed a minor league contract with the Kansas City Royals. On March 27, the Royals selected Biggio's contract after he made the team's Opening Day roster. In 37 appearances for Kansas City, he slashed .174/.296/.246 with one home run, four RBI, and one stolen base. Biggio was designated for assignment by the Royals on July 25. He cleared waivers and was released on July 30.

=== Los Angeles Angels ===
On August 6, 2025, Biggio signed a minor league contract with the Los Angeles Angels. He made 31 appearances for the Triple-A Salt Lake Bees, hitting .242/.375/.303 with one home run, 12 RBI, and three stolen bases. Biggio elected free agency following the season on November 6.

=== Houston Astros ===
On February 15, 2026, Biggio signed a minor league contract with the Houston Astros. In 123 games with Triple-A Sugar Land Space Cowboys he batted .230/.387/.415 with 18 home runs, 64 RBIs and 12 stolen bases. He elected free agency on November 2.

== Personal life ==
Cavan's brother Conor also played baseball for St. Thomas and Notre Dame, and was a 34th round draft selection by the Houston Astros in the 2015 MLB draft. Conor later went to work for the Office of the Commissioner of Baseball. As of the 2020–21 collegiate season, his sister Quinn played softball for Notre Dame.

Upon reaching the major leagues, Biggio and Vladimir Guerrero Jr., who had been called up a month earlier, became the first teammates in MLB history to be sons of Hall of Fame players.

== See also ==
- List of second-generation Major League Baseball players

Achievements
Preceded by Jonathan Villar	Hitting for the cycle September 17, 2019	Succeeded by Trea Turner
