= Jay Pettibone =

American baseball player (born 1957)

- Pitcher
- Born: June 21, 1957 (age 69); Mount Clemens, Michigan
- Batted: Right Threw: Right

MLB debut
- September 11, 1983, for the Minnesota Twins

Last MLB appearance
- October 1, 1983, for the Minnesota Twins

MLB statistics
- Win–loss record: 0–4
- Earned run average: 5.33
- Strikeouts: 10
- Stats at Baseball Reference

Teams
- Minnesota Twins (1983)

Harry Jonathan "Jay" Pettibone (born June 21, 1957) is an American former professional baseball starting pitcher, who played in Major League Baseball (MLB) for the 1983 Minnesota Twins. He batted and threw right-handed.

Pettibone was initially drafted in the 8th round (165th overall) in the 1977 MLB January Draft's Regular Phase by the San Francisco Giants out of Fullerton College, but he returned to school. He was later drafted by the Texas Rangers in the 30th round (743rd overall) of the 1979 MLB draft out of Chapman College.

After the Rangers released Pettibone following the 1980 season, he signed with the Twins during spring training 1981.

Pettibone made his MLB debut on September 11, 1983, a complete game loss in which he allowed only three runs. In his brief four-game career, he posted a win–loss record of 0–4, with a 5.33 earned run average, and 10 strikeouts, while hurling 27 innings.

Following Pettibone’s trade to the St. Louis Cardinals in December 1984, he retired from professional baseball.

Pettibone's son, Jonathan, played MLB for the 2013–14 Philadelphia Phillies.
