= Jesús Vega =

Puerto Rican baseball player (born 1955)

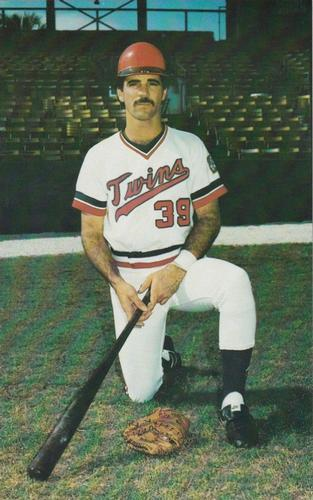
- Designated hitter
- Born: October 14, 1955 (age 70); Bayamón, Puerto Rico
- Batted: Right Threw: Right

MLB debut
- September 5, 1979, for the Minnesota Twins

Last MLB appearance
- September 8, 1982, for the Minnesota Twins

MLB statistics
- Batting average: .246
- Home runs: 5
- Runs batted in: 33
- Stats at Baseball Reference

Teams
- Minnesota Twins (1979–1980, 1982)

Jesús Anthony Vega Morales (born October 14, 1955) is a Puerto Rican former Major League Baseball (MLB) designated hitter and first baseman. He played parts of three seasons in the major leagues between 1979 and 1982, all with the Minnesota Twins.

== Pro career ==
In 1975 Jesus Vega made his pro debut for the Newark Co-Pilots of the New York-Penn League. During his first season as a pro, Vega batted .309 and drove in 27 runs. all three season Vega spent in the Milwaukee Brewers farm system, he played at the single A level and batted over 300 each season. While with the Burlington Bees Vega showed he had power to go along with his hitting, as he belted 23 home runs while maintaining a batting average over 300.

He finally reached the double-a level, but it was for the Minnesota Twins, and not the Brewers, as Vega had been acquired by the Twins. They assigned Vega to the Orlando Twins of the Southern League. While Vega's numbers went down against a higher level of competition, they still remained respectable, as he batted .297 and drove in 49 runs. Vega quickly moved up the chain in the Twins system, as the following season, he was promoted to their Triple A club, the Toledo Mud Hens. While Toledo struggled on the field, they were stocked with future major league talent like Dave Engle, Hosken Powell, Sal Butera and Gary Ward.

At 23 years old, Vega was established as the Mud Hens regular first baseman. Despite the higher level of competition, Vega batted a respectable .293 and even found a little power as well as he hit 13 home runs and led the team in RBIs with 72. Later on in the 1979 season, Vega got promoted to the majors, but his stay was short. He appeared in just four games and did not get a hit in seven at bats. In 1980, he found himself back in Toledo, but would earn another promotion to Minnesota. He stuck around for 24 games this time, but he served mainly as a Designated Hitter and played just two games at first, spelling starter Ron Johnson.

Vega did not appear in the majors at all in 1981, instead split time between Toledo and the Mets Triple A squad, the Tidewater Tides. Vega returned to Minnesota in 1982, but he was no longer in their plans, as he'd been passed up by prospect Kent Hrbek. On September 8, 1982, Vega played his final game on the major league level, getting a hit in his only at bat when he pinch hit for outfielder Bobby Mitchell in the Twins 2-0 loss to the Texas Rangers.

In 1983, Vega signed with the Los Angeles Dodgers and was assigned to their Triple A club, the Albuquerque Dukes. He also spent a portion of the 1983 season with the Mexico City Reds of the Mexican league. After one season, the Dodgers released Vega and he finished his pro career with Yucatan in the Mexican League one year later in 1985.

== See also ==
- List of Major League Baseball players from Puerto Rico

== Sources ==
- Career statistics from Baseball Reference · Baseball Reference (Minors) · Retrosheet · Baseball Almanac
