= Dan Graham (baseball) =

American baseball player (born 1954)

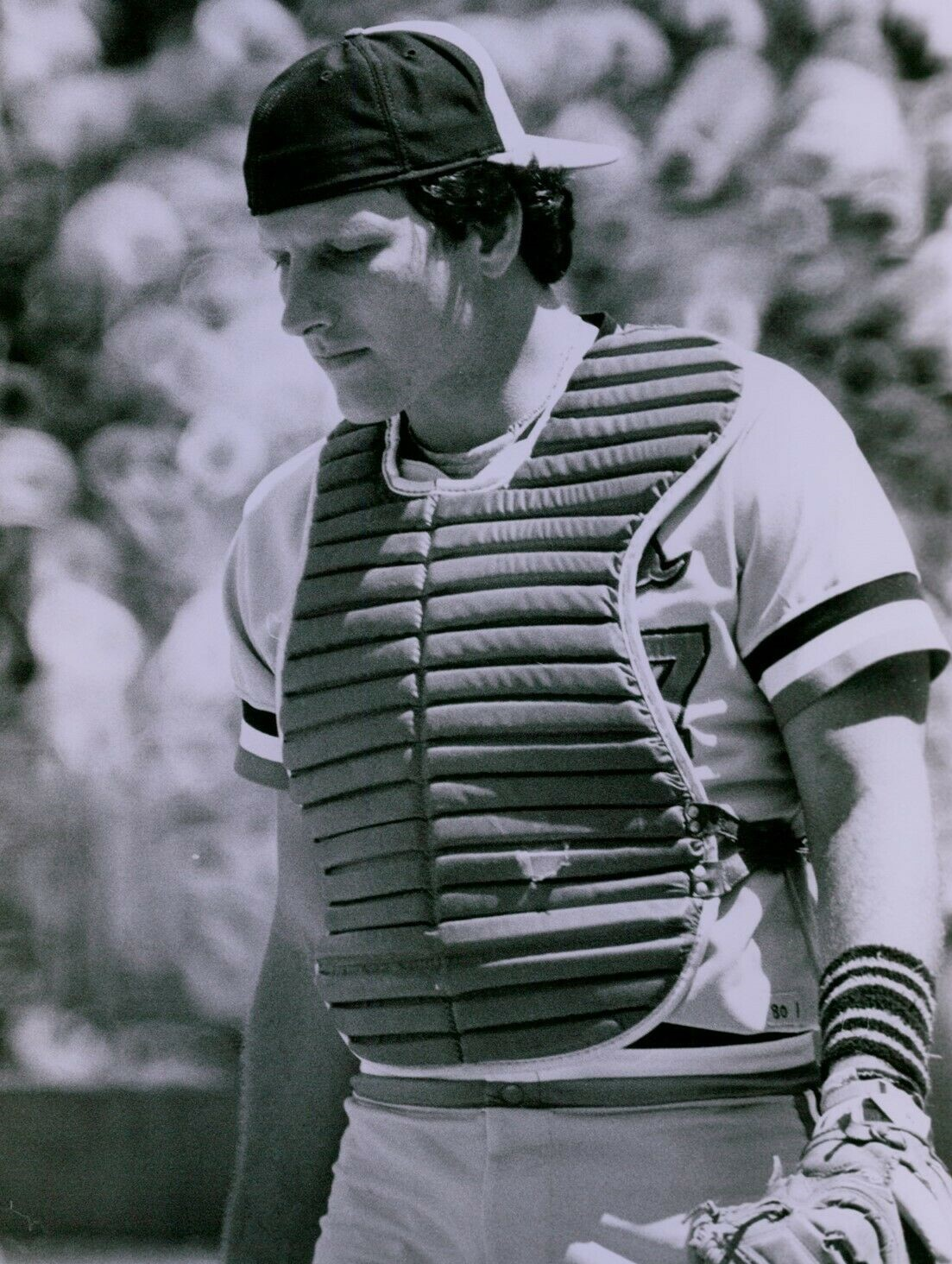
- Catcher
- Born: July 19, 1954 (age 72); Ray, Arizona, U.S.
- Batted: Left Threw: Right

MLB debut
- June 18, 1979, for the Minnesota Twins

Last MLB appearance
- October 3, 1981, for the Baltimore Orioles

MLB statistics
- Batting average: .240
- Home runs: 17
- Runs batted in: 65
- Stats at Baseball Reference

Teams
- Minnesota Twins (1979); Baltimore Orioles (1980–1981)

Daniel Jay Graham (born July 19, 1954) is an American former professional baseball player who appeared in 143 games in the Major Leagues – largely as a catcher – for the Minnesota Twins (1979) and Baltimore Orioles (1980–1981). He threw right-handed, batted left-handed, stood 6 feet 1 inch (1.85 m) tall and weighed 205 pounds (93 kg).

Graham broke into professional baseball as a third baseman. He was selected by the Twins in the fifth round of the 1975 Major League Baseball draft and three times exceeded 20 home runs during his minor league career. After debuting in MLB by going hitless in two June games for the 1979 Twins, he was acquired by Baltimore that off-season and optioned to the Triple-A Rochester Red Wings to begin the 1980 campaign. In 16 games, he batted .346 with four home runs, earning a call-up to the Orioles in May. In his second game, May 10 against the Milwaukee Brewers at County Stadium, he started at catcher and collected his first MLB hit, and homer, off Lary Sorensen. In his next two starts, May 13–14 against the Texas Rangers at Memorial Stadium, Graham had seven hits in nine at bats, including his second big-league home run. His success at the plate led manager Earl Weaver to use him on a semi-regular basis, along with right-handed-hitting Rick Dempsey. Graham started 65 games at catcher, with Dempsey starting 95.

For the season, Graham hit 15 home runs and drove home 54 runs batted in in 286 plate appearances, batting .278.

In 1981, Graham spent his only full season in the Majors, but his production plummeted to only 25 hits in 142 at-bats (.176) with two home runs. He finished his pro career with Rochester in 1982.
