= Daryle Ward =

American baseball player (born 1975)

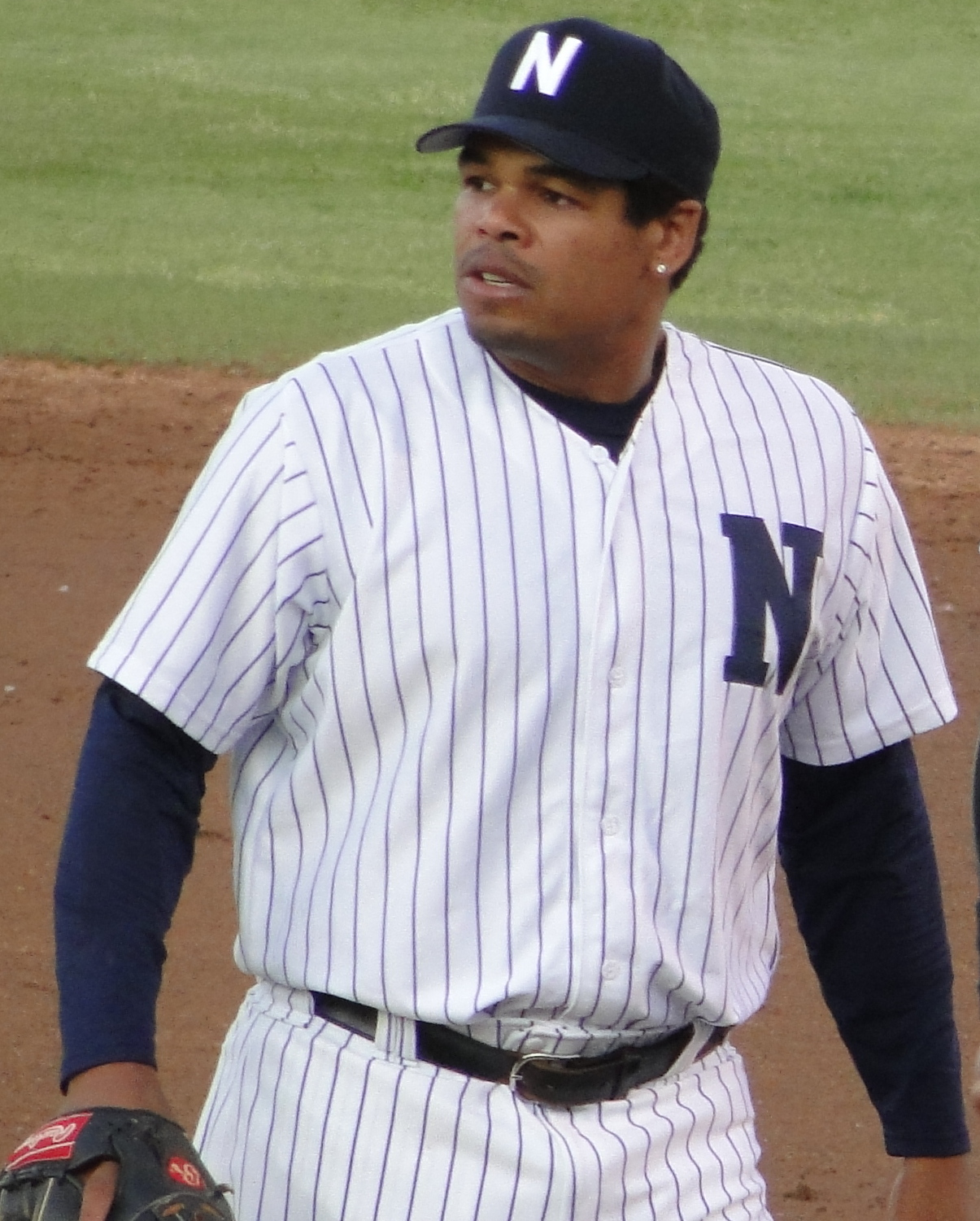
- Ward with the Newark Bears in 2012
- First baseman / Left fielder
- Born: June 27, 1975 (age 50); Lynwood, California, U.S.
- Batted: Left Threw: Left

MLB debut
- May 14, 1998, for the Houston Astros

Last MLB appearance
- September 27, 2008, for the Chicago Cubs

MLB statistics
- Batting average: .263
- Home runs: 90
- Runs batted in: 379
- Stats at Baseball Reference

Teams
- Houston Astros (1998–2002); Los Angeles Dodgers (2003); Pittsburgh Pirates (2004–2005); Washington Nationals (2006); Atlanta Braves (2006); Chicago Cubs (2007–2008)

Daryle Lamar Ward (born June 27, 1975) is an American former professional baseball first baseman and left fielder. He played 11 seasons in Major League Baseball (MLB) from 1998 to 2008 for the Houston Astros, Los Angeles Dodgers, Pittsburgh Pirates, Washington Nationals, Atlanta Braves, and Chicago Cubs. He is the son of former major leaguer Gary Ward. Daryle Ward is currently the Hitting Coach for the Louisville Bats in the Cincinnati Reds organization.

== Career ==
Ward came to the Houston Astros in December 1996 as part of a ten-player trade with Detroit. He won the 1999 AAA Home Run Derby in his home stadium of Zephyr Field in New Orleans. The next day, he hit a 3-run home run in the All Star Game, leading the PCL to victory after joining the team as a last minute replacement. His home run outshone Russell Branyan's solo home run in the same game. He debuted in 1999, hitting 8 home runs in 150 at bats. In 2000, he hit 20 home runs in just 264 at-bats. In his third season for the Astros, Ward batted .263 with 9 home runs and 39 RBI in 95 games. The next year, 2002, he batted .276 with 12 home runs and 72 RBIs in 136 games. On July 6 of that year, he became the first player to hit a home run out of Pittsburgh's PNC Park and into the Allegheny River "on the fly" during a regular-season game (the other player being Garrett Jones with a 463-foot home run on June 2, 2013); the shot, a grand slam, came off Pittsburgh's Kip Wells. Many Home Runs have made the river on the bounce, and several home runs hit during the 2006 Major League Baseball Home Run Derby made the river on the fly as well, creating speculation of juiced balls.

After the season the Astros traded Ward to the Los Angeles Dodgers. He spent 2003 in a part-time role, hitting .183 with one extra base hit (a double) in 109 at-bats. After the season, the Dodgers released Ward, and the Pirates signed him as a minor league free agent. Ward played better in 2004, and the Pirates re-signed him for 2005 as their part-time first baseman. Ward has signed on to become a member of the Chicago Cubs bench for 2007. In 549 career games played, Ward has batted .259 (384-1485), with 65 home runs, 254 RBI, 155 runs, 80 doubles and four triples, with an on-base percentage (OBP) of .306 and slugging percentage (SLG) of .447.

=== 2004 season ===
After being called up from the Triple-A Nashville Sounds to replace Raúl Mondesí, Ward got off to a torrid start. On May 26, 2004, Ward, recalled from the Triple-A Nashville Sounds two weeks before, hit for the cycle and tied his career high with six RBI in the Pirates' 11–8 victory over the St. Louis Cardinals. Ward hit a two-run double in the first, an RBI triple in the fourth, golfed a three-run homer in the fifth and singled in the ninth. He was the first Pittsburgh player to hit for the cycle since Jason Kendall on May 19, 2000, against the Cardinals. Ward joined his father, Gary, to become the first father-son combination in major league history to hit for the cycle. The elder Ward accomplished the feat on September 18, 1980, for the Minnesota Twins. (They were later joined by Craig and Cavan Biggio on September 17, 2019 as the only 2 father and son duos to hit for the cycle in MLB history.) Ward slumped later in the season, slowed down by a wrist injury, and finished hitting .249 with 15 home runs and 57 RBI, with a .306 OBP and .474 SLG. Ward, along with Valerio de los Santos, signed a deal to play with the Nationals.

=== 2006 season ===
On August 31, 2006, Ward was traded to the Atlanta Braves for minor-league pitcher Luis Atilano.

=== 2007 season ===
Ward was signed on December 7, 2006 by the Chicago Cubs to a one-year deal worth $1.05 million after hitting .308 with a .380 OBP in 2006 for Washington and Atlanta in 150 combined plate appearances. He replaced John Mabry as a backup at 1st base to Derrek Lee. On May 6, Ward hit a game-winning single against his former team, the Washington Nationals. He was also called to replace Derrek Lee on May 13, after Lee left the game with neck spasms. Ward also saw time as a pinch hitter in close game situations. On August 18 Ward hit a grand slam in the third inning off of St. Louis Cardinals pitcher Anthony Reyes, the third of his career and his first home run as a member of the Cubs. Ward finished the season with a career-high .327 batting average in 110 at-bats.

=== 2008 season ===
On August 15, Ward launched a three-run pinch-hit homer with one out in the ninth inning to lift the Cubs to a 6–5 victory over the Florida Marlins for their ninth straight road win. The Cubs had lost their last 10 games at that stadium. He became a free agent at the end of the season. Ward finished the season with a .216 batting average, the second lowest of his career.

=== Minor Leagues ===
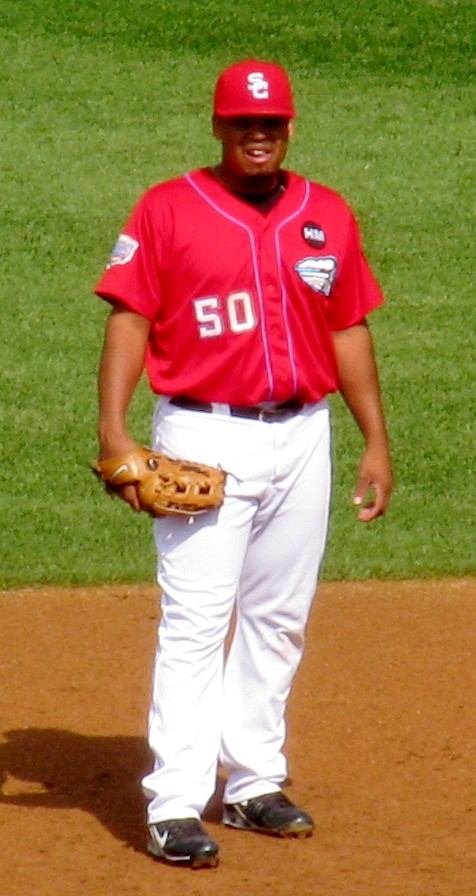
Ward playing for the Syracuse Chiefs, September 2009

On February 5, 2009, Ward signed a minor league contract with an invitation to spring training with the Cincinnati Reds.

He was released by the Reds on March 23, 2009. He played in April with the Newark Bears and hit .222 in eight games before being signed to a minor league deal on May 2 with the Chicago White Sox and assigned to Triple A Charlotte where he hit 8 home runs in 69 games.

On August 6, he was traded to the Washington Nationals organization along with outfielder Norris Hopper for cash and assigned to Syracuse. Ward hit five home runs in 30 games with the Syracuse Chiefs. Ward began the 2010 season with the Newark Bears. He signed a minor league contract with the Chicago White Sox on November 22, 2010.

Ward signed a contract to play his second full season with the Newark Bears on May 28, 2011. He was utilized as a first baseman and designated hitter. On August 1, he signed a minor league contract with the Arizona Diamondbacks and was assigned to the Double-A Mobile BayBears. On September 13, 2011, he was released. After the season, he tested positive for an amphetamine and received a 50-game suspension for the following season.

Ward played with the Lancaster Barnstormers in the Atlantic League of Professional Baseball in 2012 and 2013 and split 2014 between the Atlantic League (with the Somerset Patriots) and the Mexican League. On April 9, 2015, prior to the 2015 Atlantic League Season Ward signed with the Southern Maryland Blue Crabs. On July 20, he was released. On August 5, 2015, he signed a contract with the Sugar Land Skeeters.

== Coaching career ==
Ward was named hitting coach for the Chattanooga Lookouts for the 2023 season.

In 2025, Ward was named hitting coach for the Louisville Bats the Triple-A affiliate of the Cincinnati Reds.

== See also ==
- List of second-generation Major League Baseball players
- List of Major League Baseball players to hit for the cycle

Achievements
Preceded by Chad Moeller	Hitting for the cycle May 26, 2004	Succeeded by David Bell
