= Kevin Stanfield =

American baseball player (b.1955)

- Pitcher
- Born: December 19, 1955 (age 70); Huron, South Dakota, U.S.
- Batted: Left Threw: Left

MLB debut
- September 14, 1979, for the Minnesota Twins

Last MLB appearance
- September 25, 1979, for the Minnesota Twins

MLB statistics
- Win–loss record: 0–0
- Earned run average: 6.00
- Strikeouts: 0
- Stats at Baseball Reference

Teams
- Minnesota Twins (1979)

Kevin Bruce Stanfield (born December 19, 1955) is an American former professional baseball pitcher who played for the Minnesota Twins in 1979.

Stanfield attended San Gorgonio High School in San Bernardino, California and played college baseball at San Bernardino Valley College in 1975 and 1976. He began his professional career with the Minnesota Twins and became known as one of the best prospects in their farm system. In August 1979, with Twins owner Clark Griffith in attendance, Stanfield threw a three-hit complete game for the Triple-A Toledo Mud Hens. He was promoted to the Twins within the week.

He made a successful Major League debut with the Twins on September 14, 1979, retiring the only batter he faced in relief of Dave Goltz.

Due to arm injuries, his final pitching appearance of the 1979 season would also be his final professional baseball game at any level. He underwent an unsuccessful surgery in December 1980 and ultimately retired before the start of the 1982 season.
