= Greg Johnston (baseball) =

American baseball player (born 1955)

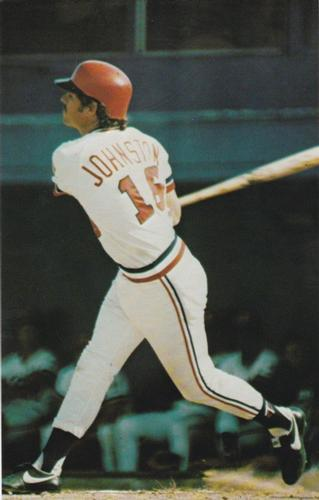
- Outfielder
- Born: February 12, 1955 (age 71); Los Angeles, California, U.S.
- Batted: Left Threw: Left

MLB debut
- July 27, 1979, for the San Francisco Giants

Last MLB appearance
- April 27, 1981, for the Minnesota Twins

MLB statistics
- Batting average: .188
- Home runs: 1
- Runs batted in: 8
- Stats at Baseball Reference

Teams
- San Francisco Giants (1979); Minnesota Twins (1980–1981); Hanshin Tigers (1982)

Gregory Bernard Johnston (born February 12, 1955) is an American former Major League Baseball (MLB) outfielder. Johnston played with the San Francisco Giants in 1979 and for the Minnesota Twins from 1980 to 1981.
