= John Verhoeven =

American baseball player (born 1952)

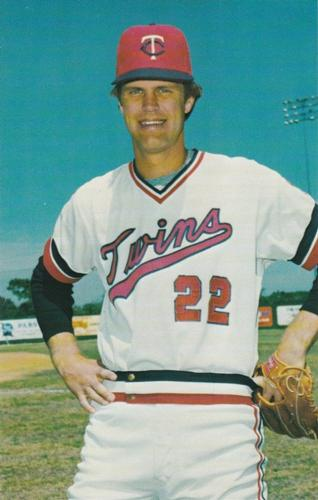

Azusa Pacific Cougars
- Pitcher
- Born: July 3, 1952 (age 74); Long Beach, California, U.S.
- Batted: Right Threw: Right

MLB debut
- July 6, 1976, for the California Angels

Last MLB appearance
- October 4, 1981, for the Minnesota Twins

MLB statistics
- Win–loss record: 3–8
- Earned run average: 3.79
- Strikeouts: 90
- Stats at Baseball Reference

Teams
- California Angels (1976–1977); Chicago White Sox (1977); Minnesota Twins (1980–1981)

John C Verhoeven (born July 3, 1952) is an American former Major League Baseball pitcher. He played four seasons in the majors for the California Angels, Chicago White Sox, and Minnesota Twins. He had been the head coach at Biola University in La Mirada, California from 1998 to 2013. He currently is an assistant pitching coach at Azusa Pacific University.
