= Tim Moreland =

American sports announcer (1947–2022)

Timothy James Moreland (January 6, 1947 – January 27, 2022) was an American radio sportscaster who was the voice of the Nebraska Cornhuskers.

== Early life ==
Moreland was born in Fort Dodge, Iowa and graduated from Bishop Heelan Catholic High School and Benedictine College. He later earned a master's degree from the University of Wisconsin-Superior and a doctorate from the University of Southern Mississippi.

== Career ==
After working in LeMars, Iowa and Casper, Wyoming, he moved to Lincoln, Nebraska, where he called football and basketball games for the University of Nebraska–Lincoln. He left Nebraska for Minnesota, where he called Minnesota Vikings games for two seasons (1983–84) and Minnesota Twins games for one (1983). In 1986, he moved to Cincinnati, where he was the play–by–play announcer for the Cincinnati Bearcats football team and hosted a radio talk show on WCKY. In 1989, he was a finalist to replace Jerry Trupiano as the Houston Oilers' play-by-play announcer, but lost the job to Steve Fallon, the son of the team's original announcer Frank Fallon. From 1994 to 2017, Moreland was a member of the staff at Catawba College, where he called football and basketball games and was a communication professor from 1994 to 2017. He also spent 11 years as an announcer for East Carolina Pirates football games, calling games on the radio when the team's regular announcer, Jeff Charles, was in the television booth.
