= Wisconsin Rapids White Sox =

- 1940–1953; (1940-1942, 1946-1953); Wisconsin Rapids, Wisconsin

Minor league affiliations
- Class: Class D (1940–1953)
- League: Wisconsin State League (1940–1953)

Major league affiliations
- Team: Chicago White Sox (1940–1953)

Team data
- Name: Wisconsin Rapids White Sox (1940–1953)
- Ballpark: Witter Field (1940–1953)

The Wisconsin Rapids White Sox were a Wisconsin State League baseball team based in Wisconsin Rapids, Wisconsin, United States. They were affiliated with the Chicago White Sox and played their home games at Witter Field. They played from 1940 to 1942, and again from 1946 to 1953.
