= Tack Wilson =

American baseball player (born 1955)

- Outfielder/Hitting coach
- Born: May 16, 1955 (age 70); Shreveport, Louisiana, U.S.
- Batted: Right Threw: Right

MLB debut
- April 9, 1983, for the Minnesota Twins

Last MLB appearance
- October 3, 1987, for the California Angels

MLB statistics
- Batting average: .333
- Games played: 12
- Runs scored: 9
- Stats at Baseball Reference

Teams
- Minnesota Twins (1983); California Angels (1987)

Michael "Tack" Wilson (born May 16, 1955) is an American former professional baseball player. He played parts of two seasons in Major League Baseball (MLB) with the Minnesota Twins and California Angels in 1983 and 1987. Primarily an outfielder, he was most often used as a pinch runner, being used in that manner in eight out of his twelve career games played.

Following his playing career, Wilson would become a coach. He was hired by the CTBC Brothers to be a hitting coach for their farm team, then was promoted to be the senior club's hitting coach on September 18, 2018.
