= Weldon Bowlin =

American baseball player (1940–2019)

- Third baseman
- Born: December 10, 1940; Paragould, Arkansas, U.S.
- Died: December 8, 2019 (aged 78); Livingston, Alabama, U.S.
- Batted: Right Threw: Right

MLB debut
- September 16, 1967, for the Kansas City Athletics

Last MLB appearance
- September 17, 1967, for the Kansas City Athletics

MLB statistics
- Batting average: .200
- Home runs: 0
- Runs batted in: 0
- Stats at Baseball Reference

Teams
- Kansas City Athletics (1967)

Lois Weldon Bowlin (December 10, 1940 – December 8, 2019) was an American Major League Baseball third baseman. Nicknamed "Hoss", he was signed by the St. Louis Cardinals as an amateur free agent in 1959, and acquired by the Kansas City Athletics in August 1961. He started two games for the A's in 1967.

Both games Bowlin appeared in were on the road against the California Angels at Anaheim Stadium (September 16 and 17). He had five at bats, (with one hit), because Sal Bando pinch-hit for him and replaced him at third in both games. Bowlin's one hit, a single to right, came against pitcher Jack Hamilton, who earlier in the season had hit Red Sox All-Star Tony Conigliaro in the face with a fastball.

In 1968, he was hired as an assistant coach of the Alabama Crimson Tide baseball team and given a scholarship to attend classes. He continued to play minor league baseball during the summer.

In his thirteen innings on the field, Bowlin recorded four assists and made no errors.

In 1971, he was the manager of the Wisconsin Rapids Twins, guiding future major leaguers Glenn Borgman, Bill Campbell and Dave McKay.

Bowlin directed the University of West Alabama baseball program for 14 years, racking up over 300 wins, including 90 Gulf South Conference wins. In 2002, he was inducted into the UWA Athletic Hall of Fame.

Bowlin died on December 8, 2019.
