= Bob Veselic =

American baseball player (1955-1995)

- Veselic with the Toledo Mud Hens, circa 1981
- Relief Pitcher
- Born: September 27, 1955; Pittsburgh, Pennsylvania, U.S.
- Died: December 26, 1995 (aged 40); Fontana, California, U.S.
- Batted: Right Threw: Right

MLB debut
- September 18, 1980, for the Minnesota Twins

Last MLB appearance
- October 3, 1981, for the Minnesota Twins

MLB statistics
- Win–loss record: 1–1
- Earned run average: 3.38
- Strikeouts: 15
- Stats at Baseball Reference

Teams
- Minnesota Twins (1980–1981)

Robert Michael Veselic (September 27, 1955 – December 26, 1995) was an American professional baseball player. The right-handed pitcher appeared in Major League Baseball in six games and 26 2/3 innings, all in relief, for the 1980–1981 Minnesota Twins. He was listed at 6 ft (1.8 m) tall and 175 lb (79 kg).

== Career ==
Veselic was native of Pittsburgh, Pennsylvania, but attended Alameda High School in the San Francisco Bay Area. He was selected by Minnesota in the first round of the 1976 Major League Baseball draft out of Mount San Antonio College. A starting pitcher in minor league baseball, he won 18 games (losing eight) in his second pro season, spent with the 1978 Visalia Oaks of the Class A California League.

Veselic made his MLB debut on September 18, 1980, in relief of Pete Redfern in a 5–0 loss to the Milwaukee Brewers. After spending 1981 with the Triple-A Toledo Mud Hens, Veselic again joined the Twins in September and worked in five games. On September 13 at Metropolitan Stadium, he relieved starter Don Cooper in the sixth inning with the Twins trailing the Chicago White Sox, 4–2. After allowing one inherited runner to score on a sacrifice fly, he gave up only one more run the rest of the way, and the Twins rallied to win the game, 7–6, for Veselic's only Major League victory. (Ironically, Cooper later became the White Sox' longtime pitching coach.)

Veselic returned to the minors in 1982 and finished his career after the 1983 season. He died from cancer at the age of 40 in Fontana, California.
