= Mike Kinnunen =

American baseball player (born 1958)

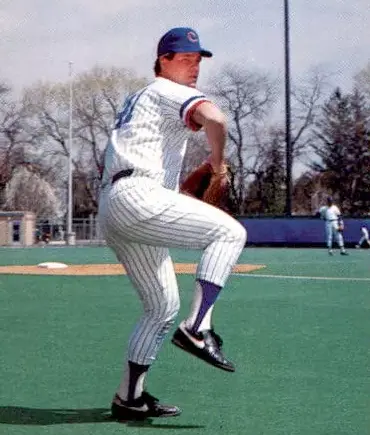
- Kinnunen with the Columbus Clippers c. 1988
- Pitcher
- Born: April 1, 1958 (age 68); Seattle, Washington, U.S.
- Batted: Left Threw: Left

MLB debut
- June 12, 1980, for the Minnesota Twins

Last MLB appearance
- October 3, 1987, for the Baltimore Orioles

MLB statistics
- Win–loss record: 0–0
- Earned run average: 5.23
- Strikeouts: 23
- Stats at Baseball Reference

Teams
- Minnesota Twins (1980); Baltimore Orioles (1986–1987)
Medals
Baseball
Representing the United States
Amateur World Series
Silver medal – second place	1978 Italy	Team

Michael John Kinnunen (/ˈkɪnʌnɛn/ KIN-uh-nen; born April 1, 1958) is an American former professional baseball pitcher. He pitched in parts of three seasons between 1980 and 1987. He holds the major league record for most pitching appearances without a decision of any kind (win, loss or save) with 48.

== Career ==
Kinnunen attended Washington State University, where he played college baseball for the Cougars from 1977 to 1979.

Kinnunen was selected by the Minnesota Twins in the 10th round of the 1979 Major League Baseball draft, and was quickly promoted to the majors in 1980. Although he pitched reasonably well, he spent 1981 in the minors before being traded to the St. Louis Cardinals. He finally made it back to the majors in 1986 after bouncing around the minors for several years.

As of 2008, Kinnunen was living in Carolina, Puerto Rico, where he worked at Roberto Clemente Stadium.
