= Bob Randall (baseball) =

American baseball player (born 1948)

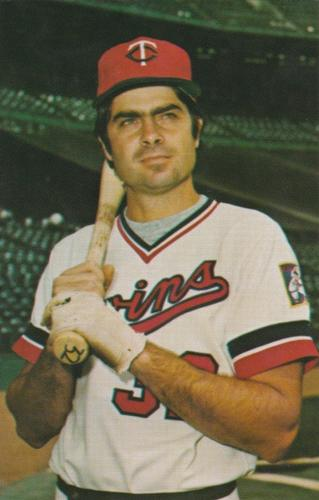
- Second baseman
- Born: June 10, 1948 (age 78); Norton, Kansas, U.S.
- Batted: Right Threw: Right

MLB debut
- April 13, 1976, for the Minnesota Twins

Last MLB appearance
- May 31, 1980, for the Minnesota Twins

MLB statistics
- Batting average: .257
- Home runs: 1
- Runs batted in: 91
- Stats at Baseball Reference

Teams
- Minnesota Twins (1976–1980)

Robert Lee Randall (born June 10, 1948) is an American former professional baseball second baseman and college baseball coach. He played five seasons in Major League Baseball from 1976 until 1980, all for the Minnesota Twins. The native of Gove, Kansas threw and batted right-handed and was listed as 6 feet 2 inches (1.88 m) tall and 175 pounds (79 kg). He graduated from Gove High School and Kansas State University.

== Professional playing career ==
Randall was selected by the Los Angeles Dodgers in three separate drafts: 1966, 1968, and finally the 2nd round in 1969, after which he signed. For the next five and a half years, he played 744 games in the Dodgers' farm system and batted over .300 four times, but was never promoted to the major league level. Then, on December 23, 1975, he got his first break when he was traded to the Twins in exchange for reserve outfielder Danny Walton.

Randall's second, perhaps more important, break was Minnesota manager Gene Mauch's decision to move future Hall of Famer Rod Carew to first base, opening up second base for Randall, who beat out Jerry Terrell for the job in spring training. Randall capitalized on the opportunity, batting .267 in 153 games in 1976 while finishing fourth in the American League in sacrifice hits.

That turned out to be the high mark of Randall's career. He spent the next two seasons splitting time at second base with Rob Wilfong, losing the starting job to the lefty-hitting Wilfong entirely in 1979. The following spring, he was released by the Twins and briefly served as a coach, then was restored to the active playing roster in May. He appeared in just five games in the majors in 1980, going 3-for-15, before being released, and Randall retired soon afterwards. For his MLB career, he collected 341 hits, including 50 doubles, nine triples, and one home run, a solo blow hit June 23, 1976, against Chris Knapp of the Chicago White Sox at Metropolitan Stadium. Randall batted .257 lifetime with 91 runs batted in.

== College baseball coach ==
Following Randall's major league career, he turned to the college coaching ranks. He was head baseball coach at Iowa State University from 1985 to 1995, going 309–311–1 before leaving to be head coach at the University of Kansas from 1996 until 2002, going 166–213. He is currently the assistant baseball coach and a professor of economics at Manhattan Christian College.

== Head coaching record ==
Record table
Season	Team	Overall	Conference	Standing	Postseason
Iowa State Cyclones (Big Eight Conference) (1985–1995)
1985	Iowa State	22–38	6–15		
1986	Iowa State	25–33–1	6–17		
1987	Iowa State	25–27	7–13		
1988	Iowa State	27–31	8–16	T–5th	
1989	Iowa State	33–27	11–13		
1990	Iowa State	36–26			
1991	Iowa State	33–26	12–12		
1992	Iowa State	33–23	11–13	T–4th	
1993	Iowa State	17–28	5–18	7th	
1994	Iowa State	30–28	15–14	4th	
1995	Iowa State	28–24	13–12		
Iowa State:		309–311–1			
Kansas Jayhawks (Big Eight Conference) (1996)
1996	Kansas	26–30	11–17	6th	
Kansas Jayhawks (Big 12 Conference) (1997–2002)
1997	Kansas	31–25	12–18	8th	
1998	Kansas	22–29	7–20	11th	
1999	Kansas	14–40	4–26	10th	
2000	Kansas	25–30	10–20	9th	
2001	Kansas	26–30	7–23	11th	
2002	Kansas	22–29	5–21	10th	
Kansas:		166–213			
Total:		475–524–1			
National champion Postseason invitational champion Conference regular season champion Conference regular season and conference tournament champion Division regular season champion Division regular season and conference tournament champion Conference tournament champion
