= Hosken Powell =

American baseball player (1955–2025)

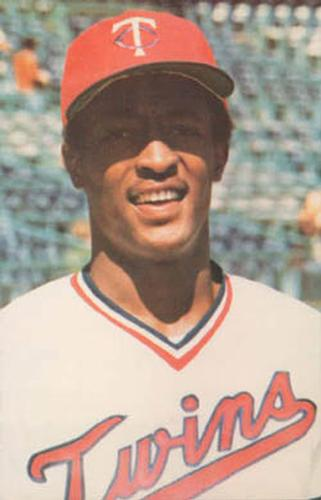
- Right fielder
- Born: May 14, 1955; Selma, Alabama, U.S.
- Died: June 27, 2025 (aged 70); Pensacola, Florida, U.S.
- Batted: Left Threw: Left

MLB debut
- April 5, 1978, for the Minnesota Twins

Last MLB appearance
- July 1, 1983, for the Toronto Blue Jays

MLB statistics
- Batting average: .259
- Home runs: 17
- Runs batted in: 160
- Stats at Baseball Reference

Teams
- Minnesota Twins (1978–1981); Toronto Blue Jays (1982–1983)

Hosken Powell (May 14, 1955 – June 27, 2025) was an American professional baseball player. He played from 1978 to 1983 for the Minnesota Twins and Toronto Blue Jays of Major League Baseball (MLB). An outfielder, he threw and batted left-handed, stood 6 feet 1 inch (1.85 m) tall and weighed 175 pounds (79 kg). He attended Chipola College, Marianna, Florida.

== Career ==
Powell was selected by the Twins in the first round of the secondary phase of the June 1975 amateur draft. He batted over .300 for his first three professional baseball seasons and was an All-Star in the Class A California League (1976), when he led the league in runs scored and batted .345.

He was in the Twins' lineup as the starting right fielder and lead-off man on Opening Day 1978, and went one for four in his debut game, with an infield hit off Glenn Abbott of the Seattle Mariners. Powell started in 99 games in right field that season, but hit only .247 with little power. In 1979, he reached a career high in batting average, at .293, and started in 81 games. In 1980, Powell appeared in 137 games, 118 as a starter, and had a career-high 127 hits, but his average fell to .262 and had only 28 extra-base hits, including six home runs. He led American League right-fielders in errors with nine.

Strike-shortened 1981 was Powell's last year with Minnesota. He appeared in 80 games, 65 as a starting player, and batted .239. Powell was traded to the Blue Jays on December 28. He got into 112 games as a reserve outfielder and designated hitter for Toronto in 1982, and raised his average to .275. Powell was released after a poor half season in 1983 and returned to the minor leagues, with the Triple-A Vancouver Canadians of the Milwaukee Brewers' organization. He returned to Vancouver for a full season in 1984, but was not recalled by the Brewers, and he played his eleventh and final pro season in 1985 in the Mexican League.

Overall, Powell appeared in 594 games played in over six Major League seasons. His 470 hits included 78 doubles, 17 triples and 17 home runs. He batted .259 in 1,816 at bats.

== Death ==
Powell died June 27, 2025, at the age of 70.
