= Rick Stelmaszek =

American baseball player and coach (1948–2017)

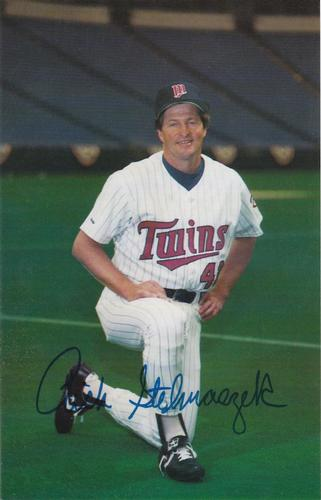
- Stelmaszek in 1987 as a coach for the Minnesota Twins
- Catcher / Bullpen coach
- Born: October 8, 1948; Chicago, Illinois, U.S.
- Died: November 6, 2017 (aged 69); Chicago, Illinois, U.S.
- Batted: Left Threw: Right

MLB debut
- June 25, 1971, for the Washington Senators

Last MLB appearance
- September 25, 1974, for the Chicago Cubs

MLB statistics
- Games: 60
- Hits: 15
- Batting average: .170
- Stats at Baseball Reference

Teams
- As player: Washington Senators / Texas Rangers (1971, 1973); California Angels (1973); Chicago Cubs (1974); As coach: Minnesota Twins (1981–2012)

Career highlights and awards
- 2× World Series champion (1987, 1991); Minnesota Twins Hall of Fame

Richard Francis Stelmaszek (/stɛlˈmeɪzɛk/ stel-MAY-zek; October 8, 1948 – November 6, 2017) was an American Major League Baseball catcher, and bullpen coach for the Minnesota Twins.

Stelmaszek spent 32 consecutive seasons (1981–2012) on the Twins' coaching staff and was the longest-tenured coach in Minnesota history. Stelmaszek trails only Nick Altrock, who spent 42 consecutive years (1912–1953) as a coach with the old Washington Senators (the predecessor to the Twins' franchise), and Manny Mota, who worked as a Los Angeles Dodgers coach for 34 straight years (1980–2013), as the longest-tenured coach in continuous service with one franchise in MLB history.

== Early years ==
Stelmaszek was drafted on June 6, 1967, by the Washington Senators in the 11th round (205th overall) of the 1967 Major League Baseball draft out of Mendel Catholic High School in Chicago, but didn't sign until August 28, keeping him from his minor league debut until 1968.

The following year, Stelmaszek was assigned to low Single-A Geneva Senators and spent time between Geneva and the high Single-A Salisbury Senators, batting a combined .232 with five home runs and 37 runs batted in (RBI) in 101 games. In 1969, he was back at Single-A, this time for the Shelby Senators in the Western Carolinas League. Stelmaszek played well, hitting .288 with five home runs and 58 RBI in 115 games, earning a spot on the league All-Star team. In 1970, he was promoted to the Double-A Pittsfield Senators and despite his overall production at the plate dropping (hitting only .246 with four home runs and 47 RBI in 128 games), he was again named to the league all-star team.

The 1971 campaign would see Stelmaszek promoted to the Triple-A Denver Bears, where he hit only .247 with almost no power (one home run, one triple, one double and 25 RBI in 73 games), but he earned a call up to the Senators and made his major league debut on June 25 against the New York Yankees. However, after going hitless in nine at-bats, he was back in the minors within a month. During the offseason, the Washington franchise moved to Arlington, Texas, and became the Texas Rangers.

== Major League career ==
After spending all of 1972 in the minors, splitting time between Hawaii, Indianapolis and Denver, Stelmaszek earned a second call to the majors in 1973. He was batting .111 in seven games with the Rangers when he was dealt along with Mike Epstein and Rich Hand to the California Angels for Lloyd Allen and Jim Spencer on May 20. Stelmaszek would last only 22 games with the Angels, batting .154 with 3 RBI. He spent most of the season at Triple-A with the Salt Lake City Angels, hitting .269 with six home runs and 40 RBI in 83 games.

Stelmaszek started the 1974 season back with Salt Lake City, but was traded to the Chicago Cubs on July 28 for Horacio Piña. He hit his only career Major League home run as a member of the Cubs on August 20 against future Baseball Hall of Famer Don Sutton of the Los Angeles Dodgers.

Prior to spring training 1976, Stelmaszek was dealt to the New York Yankees for Gerry Pirtle, and he spent the season at Triple-A Syracuse, with the exception of a brief call-up to the Yankees' Major League roster in April, during which he did not get into any games. He returned to the Rangers' organization in 1977, but again spent the season at Triple-A, this time with the Tucson Toros. Stelmaszek would spend 1978, his last year playing organized ball, in the Minnesota Twins organization as a player-manager for the Single-A Wisconsin Rapids.

== Coaching career ==
After retiring as a player at the end of the 1978 season, Stelmaszek was hired on as the full-time manager of the Rapids. In 1980, he was named Midwest League Manager of the Year after leading his team to a 77–64 record. Following the season, he joined the Twins' major league coaching staff under Johnny Goryl. During his coaching tenure with the Twins, which began in 1981, Stelmaszek was a member of two World Series championship teams (the 1987 and 1991 Twins) and he worked under five different Minnesota managers (Goryl, Billy Gardner, Ray Miller, Tom Kelly, and Ron Gardenhire).

The Twins signed him to a contract extension through 2012 in November 2010. Stelmaszek missed spring training and the first month of the 2011 season due to eye surgery. Former Twins catcher Phil Roof served as his replacement during his recovery. On October 3, 2012, following a 2–1 season-ending loss to the Toronto Blue Jays which capped the first back-to-back 96-loss seasons for the Twins, interim General Manager Terry Ryan announced the firing of Stelmaszek after 32 seasons with the club.

Stelmaszek was diagnosed with pancreatic cancer in December 2016. On April 3, 2017, he was honored to throw out the first pitch at Target Field as the Twins opened their 57th season. Beforehand, he explained his goal: "Throw the ball and then walk from the mound to the dugout without falling." Stelmaszek died on November 6, 2017, aged 69.

Longtime Twins reliever Glen Perkins had this to say following Stelmaszek's death:

My Grandpa taught me to throw lefty. Todd Oakes taught me how to be a man. Stelly taught me how to be a pro. Cancer took all 3. FU Cancer.

Preceded by Jerry Zimmerman	Minnesota Twins bullpen coach 1981–2012	Succeeded by Bobby Cuellar
