= John Castino =

American baseball player (born 1954)

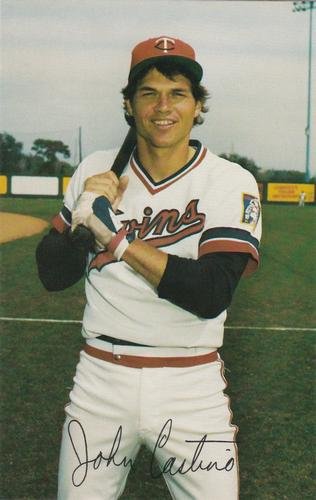
- Third baseman / Second baseman
- Born: October 23, 1954 (age 71); Evanston, Illinois, U.S.
- Batted: Right Threw: Right

MLB debut
- April 6, 1979, for the Minnesota Twins

Last MLB appearance
- May 7, 1984, for the Minnesota Twins

MLB statistics
- Batting average: .278
- Home runs: 41
- Runs batted in: 249
- Stats at Baseball Reference

Teams
- Minnesota Twins (1979–1984)

Career highlights and awards
- AL Rookie of the Year (1979)

John Anthony Castino (born October 23, 1954) is an American former Major League Baseball player. Castino played as an infielder, primarily at third base and second base, with the Minnesota Twins from 1979 through 1984.

== Professional career ==
Castino graduated from New Trier High School in Winnetka, Illinois. Castino attended and played baseball for Rollins College, in Winter Park, Florida. He is considered the best player in Rollins history.

Castino was drafted by the Minnesota Twins in the 3rd round of the 1976 amateur draft after being scouted by long-time team scout Zinn Beck. Castino made his major league debut with the Twins on April 6, 1979. He played well and ended the season with a .285 batting average and 112 hits in 148 games. His performance led him to be voted as Rookie of the Year, along with Alfredo Griffin, whom he tied in voting.

The next season, Castino hit a career-high .302, and the year after that he led the American League with 9 triples. A good fielder, he switched to second base in 1982 and led the league's second basemen in fielding percentage that year. However, Castino started to suffer from chronic back pain, and his career was cut short in 1984 by a fused disc in his back. He played his final game with the Twins on May 7, 1984; after years of back problems, he further damaged his back running hard from third on a sacrifice fly, scoring the final run in the ninth inning of an 11-1 Twins victory.

After his baseball career ended, Castino went back to college to get his degree and later became an investment advisor. In 2010, he was named one of the 50 greatest players in Minnesota Twins history.

== See also ==
- List of Major League Baseball annual triples leaders
