= Johnny Goryl =

American baseball player (born 1933)

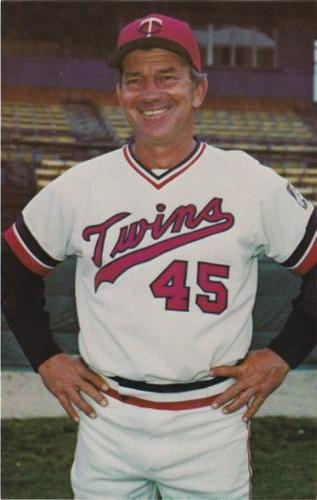
- Second baseman / Third baseman / Manager
- Born: October 21, 1933 (age 92); Cumberland, Rhode Island, U.S.
- Batted: Right Threw: Right

MLB debut
- September 20, 1957, for the Chicago Cubs

Last MLB appearance
- October 2, 1964, for the Minnesota Twins

MLB statistics
- Batting average: .225
- Home runs: 16
- Runs batted in: 48
- Managerial record: 34–38
- Winning %: .472
- Stats at Baseball Reference
- Managerial record at Baseball Reference

Teams
- As player: Chicago Cubs (1957–1959); Minnesota Twins (1962–1964); As manager: Minnesota Twins (1980–1981); Honors: Cleveland Guardians Distinguished Hall of Fame (2024)

John Albert Goryl (/ˈɡɔːrəl/ GOR-əl;born October 21, 1933) is an American former infielder, manager and coach in Major League Baseball.

A right-handed batter and thrower who stood 5 feet 10 inches (1.78 m) tall and weighed 175 pounds (79 kg), Goryl apprenticed in the farm systems of the Boston / Milwaukee Braves and Chicago Cubs for seven full seasons beginning in 1951. He played 117 games for the Cubs over three seasons (1957–59), returned to the minor leagues when he was traded to the Los Angeles Dodgers, then joined the Minnesota Twins in 1962 for the remainder of his MLB playing career. His finest season was 1963, when he hit .287 with nine home runs in 64 games. Overall, Goryl batted .225 with 134 hits in 276 games over six MLB campaigns.

When his playing career ended, Goryl became a manager in the Twins' farm system (1966–68; 1970–78), and third-base coach of the MLB Twins (1968–69; 1979–80). During his second stint as a Minnesota coach in 1980 he was named successor to manager Gene Mauch on August 25. The Twins won 23 of their final 36 games that season, to improve from sixth to third place in the American League West, but when they faltered coming out of the gate in 1981 — losing 25 of their first 36 games — Goryl was replaced by one of his coaches, Billy Gardner. His career MLB managing record was 34–38 (.472).

After his release from the Twins, Goryl joined the Cleveland Indians' organization as a Major League coach (1982–88; 1997–98) and development official in the Indians' minor league system, continuing into the present day as special adviser/player development. He was inducted in the Kinston Professional Baseball Hall of Fame in 2002. Goryl won the Mike Coolbaugh Award in 2012 for his work ethic, knowledge of the game, and mentoring of young players.

Goryl was inducted into the Cleveland Guardians Distinguished Hall of Fame in 2024.
