= Gary Ward (outfielder) =

American baseball player and coach (born 1953)

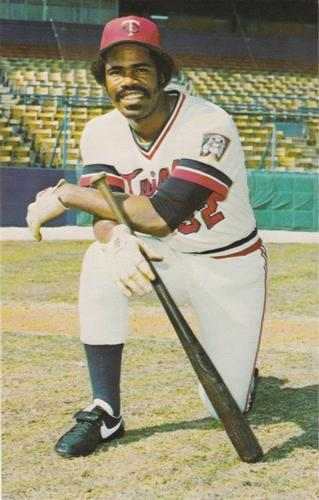
- Left fielder
- Born: December 6, 1953 (age 72); Los Angeles, California, U.S.
- Batted: Right Threw: Right

MLB debut
- September 3, 1979, for the Minnesota Twins

Last MLB appearance
- October 3, 1990, for the Detroit Tigers

MLB statistics
- Batting average: .276
- Home runs: 130
- Runs batted in: 597
- Stats at Baseball Reference

Teams
- Minnesota Twins (1979–1983); Texas Rangers (1984–1986); New York Yankees (1987–1989); Detroit Tigers (1989–1990)

Career highlights and awards
- 2× All-Star (1983, 1985)

Gary Lamell Ward (born December 6, 1953) is an American former professional baseball outfielder who played in Major League Baseball from 1979 to 1990 for the Minnesota Twins, Texas Rangers, New York Yankees, and Detroit Tigers. He is the father of former major league player Daryle Ward.

== Playing career ==
Ward was signed by Minnesota as an amateur free agent in 1972 and made his major league debut late in the 1979 season when he played in 10 games for the Twins. He also played 13 games for the Twins late in the 1980 season. On September 18, 1980, Ward became the sixth Twins player to hit for the cycle, doing so in the first game of a doubleheader against the Milwaukee Brewers at Milwaukee County Stadium. Ward's cycle came in the 14th game of his career, which still stands as the Major League record for fewest games played until hitting for the cycle. On May 13, 2007, while playing for the San Francisco Giants, Fred Lewis hit for the cycle in the 16th game of his Major League career, narrowly missing Ward's mark.

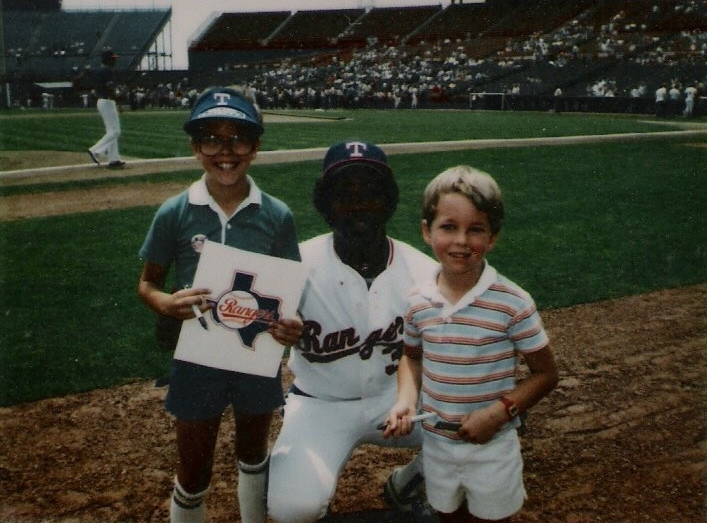
Ward with two fans in 1985

Ward was named the American League Rookie of the Year by Baseball Digest in 1981, and he also was named Twins Player of the Year and Most Improved Player in 1982. That season, he batted .289, with 28 home runs, 91 runs batted in, and a .519 slugging average. In 1983, he hit .278 with 19 home runs and 88 RBI, and he led all outfielders with 24 assists—the most for an American League outfielder since 1944. He was traded to the Rangers at the end of the season.

In his first season with Texas, Ward hit .284 with 21 home runs and 79 RBI, and he set a club season record with 7 triples and a personal high of 97 runs scored. He led the Rangers in batting in 1985 and 1986 (.287 and .316, respectively), and then signed with the Yankees as a free agent. He had a great first half in 1987, but he slumped badly in the second half of the season. For the following two seasons, he was a part-time player; he was released by the Yankees in mid-1989 and was signed by Detroit shortly thereafter. He finished his career with Detroit in 1990.

Ward was a two-time AL All-Star—1983 and 1985. For his career, he had a .276 batting average, 130 home runs, 1,236 hits, 597 RBI, 594 runs, 196 doubles, 41 triples, and 83 stolen bases in 1,287 games played.

== Post-playing career ==
Ward has served as a coach in Minor League Baseball for several teams within the Chicago White Sox organization; the Charlotte Knights (1999–2001 and 2009–2010), Winston-Salem Dash (2011–2012 and 2014), Birmingham Barons (2013), and Arizona League White Sox (2015–2017).

On May 26, 2004, Ward's son Daryle hit for the cycle; the Wards were the first father-son combination in major league history to hit for the cycle. They were later joined by Craig and Cavan Biggio on September 17, 2019 as the only 2 father and son duos to hit for the cycle in MLB history.

== See also ==
- List of Major League Baseball players to hit for the cycle

Achievements
Preceded by Mike Easler	Hitting for the cycle September 18, 1980	Succeeded by Charlie Moore
