= 1979 New York Yankees season =

Season for the Major League Baseball team the New York Yankees

1979 New York Yankees
- League: American League
- Division: East
- Ballpark: Yankee Stadium
- City: New York City
- Record: 89-71 (.556)
- Owners: George Steinbrenner
- General managers: Cedric Tallis
- Managers: Bob Lemon, Billy Martin
- Television: WPIX; SportsChannel NY (Phil Rizzuto, Frank Messer, Bill White)
- Radio: WINS (AM) (Frank Messer, Phil Rizzuto, Bill White, Fran Healy)

The 1979 New York Yankees season was the 77th season for the franchise. The season was marked by the death of their starting catcher and team captain, Thurman Munson, on August 2. The team finished with a record of 89–71, finishing fourth in the American League East, 13.5 games behind the Baltimore Orioles, ending the Yankees' three-year domination of the AL East. New York was managed by Bob Lemon and Billy Martin. The Yankees played at Yankee Stadium.

As the Munson Era came to a tragic end within this season, a new era was about to unfold. 1979 marked the first time ever for the Yankees to broadcast their games on cable within New York City and surrounding areas, becoming the first ever MLB team to do so. Starting Opening Day that year, all Yankees games save for the nationally aired games were broadcast on the then 3-year old cable channel SportsChannel NY (aside from the usual WPIX telecast for free to air television viewers in the New York area and nationwide via satellite and cable).

== Offseason ==
In January 1979, the Yankees attempted to acquire first baseman Rod Carew from the Minnesota Twins in exchange for Chris Chambliss, Juan Beníquez, Dámaso García, and Dave Righetti, but the deal fell through. Carew was later traded to the California Angels.

=== Notable transactions ===
- November 10, 1978: Sparky Lyle, Domingo Ramos, Mike Heath, Larry McCall, Dave Rajsich, and cash were traded by the Yankees to the Texas Rangers for Dave Righetti, Juan Beníquez, Mike Griffin, Paul Mirabella and Greg Jemison (minors).
- November 13, 1978: Luis Tiant was signed as a free agent by the Yankees.
- November 21, 1978: Tommy John was signed as a free agent by the Yankees.
- December 4, 1978: Bobby Brown was drafted from the Yankees by the New York Mets in the 1978 rule 5 draft.

== Regular season ==
In mid-April, closer Rich “Goose” Gossage broke the thumb on his pitching hand in a clubhouse fight with teammate Cliff Johnson. Gossage missed the rest of April, all of May, and half of June with the injury. Ron Guidry volunteered to take his place as bullpen closer along with his regular starts and posted two saves. Johnson was later traded to the Cleveland Indians.

Bob Lemon, who had taken over the team in July 1978 after Billy Martin resigned amid controversy where he called Reggie Jackson and George Steinbrenner liars, entered the season with the understanding that he would be promoted to a front office position following the season. However, after a 34–31 start to the season, Steinbrenner fired Lemon and asked Martin, who was to take over the team in 1980, to start managing early. Martin agreed, which did not sit well with some of the team including Jackson. The move also did not sit well with team president Al Rosen, who resigned from the Yankees shortly thereafter.

On August 6, the Yankees flew to Ohio to attend Thurman Munson's memorial service, then flew back to New York to play their scheduled game against Baltimore. This game was televised live nationwide on ABC's Monday Night Baseball and featured clips of the memorial and an interview Munson gave to Howard Cosell days before. Bobby Murcer hit a three-run home run in the bottom of the seventh inning, then drove in two more runs in the ninth with a single off former Yankee Tippy Martinez to account for all five Yankee runs in a 5–4 win. After the game, Murcer gave the bat to Munson's widow.

On September 12, Carl Yastrzemski of the Boston Red Sox joined the 3,000 hit club with a single off Jim Beattie of the Yankees. The same game also marked the final appearance at Fenway Park for Hall of Fame pitcher Catfish Hunter.

On September 18, pitcher Bob Kammeyer set a single-season record by giving up eight earned runs without recording an out in his only game of the season. It was his last major league appearance.

=== Thurman Munson ===
Thurman Munson's number 15 was retired by the New York Yankees in 1979.

As his career progressed, Thurman Munson became increasingly homesick as his schedule did not allow him to spend enough time at home with his wife and children. Since he kept his home in Ohio during the offseason, he decided that air travel was the best solution and began taking flying lessons. Munson bought a Cessna Citation I/SP jet and by 1979 was regularly using it to transport himself to and from various cities and his home. On one of these trips, where his manager Billy Martin was a passenger, Martin noticed the plane's engine malfunctioned in flight and informed Munson, who discovered the entire engine was destroyed and he had to pay to have a new one installed. Martin grew concerned but was unable to convince Munson to stop.

On August 2, 1979, Munson was at the Akron-Canton Regional Airport practicing takeoffs and landings. On the fourth touch-and-go, Munson failed to lower the flaps for landing and allowed the aircraft to sink too low before increasing engine power, causing the jet to clip a tree and fall short of the runway. The plane then hit a tree stump and burst into flames. Munson suffered a broken neck on impact and thus was trapped inside the aircraft, unable to move. His companions were able to escape the wreck. Munson was consumed by the flames and toxic fumes released by the burning fuselage and died of asphyxiation. He was 32 years old.

Munson's sudden death was major news across the nation and his loss was especially felt in the baseball community. Munson was survived by his wife, Diana, and their three children. The day after his death, before the start of the Yankees' four-game set with the Baltimore Orioles in the Bronx, the Yankees paid tribute to their fallen captain in a pre-game ceremony during which the starters stood at their defensive positions, save for the catcher's box, which remained empty. At the conclusion of Robert Merrill's musical selection, the fans (announced attendance 51,151) burst into a 10-minute standing ovation.

=== Season standings ===
AL East
Team	W	L	Pct.	GB	Home	Road
Baltimore Orioles	102	57	.642	—	55‍–‍24	47‍–‍33
Milwaukee Brewers	95	66	.590	8	52‍–‍29	43‍–‍37
Boston Red Sox	91	69	.569	11½	51‍–‍29	40‍–‍40
New York Yankees	89	71	.556	13½	51‍–‍30	38‍–‍41
Detroit Tigers	85	76	.528	18	46‍–‍34	39‍–‍42
Cleveland Indians	81	80	.503	22	47‍–‍34	34‍–‍46
Toronto Blue Jays	53	109	.327	50½	32‍–‍49	21‍–‍60

=== Record vs. opponents ===
1979 American League record Sources:
Team	BAL	BOS	CAL	CWS	CLE	DET	KC	MIL	MIN	NYY	OAK	SEA	TEX	TOR
Baltimore	—	8–5	9–3	8–3	8–5	7–6	6–6	8–5	8–4	5–6	8–4	10–2	6–6	11–2
Boston	5–8	—	5–7	5–6	6–7	8–5	8–4	8–4	9–3	5–8	9–3	8–4	6–6	9–4
California	3–9	7–5	—	9–4	6–6	4–8	7–6	7–5	9–4	7–5	10–3	7–6	5–8	7–5
Chicago	3–8	6–5	4–9	—	6–6	3–9	5–8	5–7	5–8	4–8	9–4	5–8	11–2	7–5
Cleveland	5–8	7–6	6–6	6–6	—	6–6	6–6	4–9	8–4	5–8	8–4	7–5	5–7	8–5
Detroit	6–7	5–8	8–4	9–3	6–6	—	5–7	6–7	4–8	7–6	7–5	7–5	6–6	9–4
Kansas City	6–6	4–8	6–7	8–5	6–6	7–5	—	5–7	7–6	5–7	9–4	7–6	6–7	9–3
Milwaukee	5–8	4–8	5–7	7–5	9–4	7–6	7–5	—	8–4	9–4	6–6	9–3	9–3	10–3
Minnesota	4–8	3–9	4–9	8–5	4–8	8–4	6–7	4–8	—	7–5	9–4	10–3	4–9	11–1
New York	6–5	8–5	5–7	8–4	8–5	6–7	7–5	4–9	5–7	—	9–3	6–6	8–4	9–4
Oakland	4–8	3–9	3–10	4–9	4–8	5–7	4–9	6–6	4–9	3–9	—	8–5	2–11	4–8
Seattle	2–10	4–8	6–7	8–5	5–7	5–7	6–7	3–9	3–10	6–6	5–8	—	6–7	8–4
Texas	6–6	6–6	8–5	2–11	7–5	6–6	7–6	3–9	9–4	4–8	11–2	7–6	—	7–5
Toronto	2–11	4–9	5–7	5–7	5–8	4–9	3–9	3–10	1–11	4–9	8–4	4–8	5–7	—

=== Notable transactions ===
- April 12, 1979: Paul Blair was released by the Yankees.
- April 19, 1979: Bobby Brown was purchased by the Yankees from the Toronto Blue Jays.
- May 11, 1979: Jim Kaat was purchased by the Yankees from the Philadelphia Phillies.
- May 23, 1979: Dick Tidrow was traded by the Yankees to the Chicago Cubs for Ray Burris.
- June 5, 1979: 1979 Major League Baseball draft
  - Don Mattingly was drafted by the Yankees in the 19th round.
  - Otis Nixon was drafted by the Yankees in the 1st round (3rd pick) of the secondary phase. Player signed June 9, 1979.
- June 15, 1979: Jay Johnstone was traded by the Yankees to the San Diego Padres for Dave Wehrmeister.
- June 26, 1979: Paul Semall (minors) was traded by the Yankees to the Chicago Cubs for Bobby Murcer.
- August 1, 1979: Mickey Rivers and players to be named later were traded by the Yankees to the Texas Rangers for Oscar Gamble, Amos Lewis (minors) and players to be named later. The deal was completed on October 8, when the Rangers sent Ray Fontenot and Gene Nelson to the Yankees, and the Yankees sent Bob Polinsky (minors), Neal Mersch (minors), and Mark Softy (minors) to the Rangers to complete the trade.
- August 20, 1979: Ray Burris was selected off waivers from the Yankees by the New York Mets.

=== Roster ===
1979 New York Yankees
Roster
Pitchers: 19 Rick Anderson; 45 Jim Beattie; 53 Ray Burris; 43 Ken Clay; 39 Ron Davis; 31 Ed Figueroa; 54 Goose Gossage; 52 Mike Griffin; 49 Ron Guidry; 46 Don Hood; 29 Catfish Hunter; 25 Tommy John; 36 Jim Kaat; 53 Bob Kammeyer; 36,55 Paul Mirabella; 56 Dave Righetti; 50 Roger Slagle; 23 Luis Tiant; 19 Dick Tidrow	Catchers: 27 Brad Gulden; 41 Cliff Johnson; 15 Thurman Munson; 38 Jerry Narron; 47,58 Bruce Robinson; Infielders: 10 Chris Chambliss; 20 Bucky Dent; 18 Brian Doyle; 59 Dámaso García; 9 Graig Nettles; 30 Willie Randolph; 41 George Scott; 12 Jim Spencer; 57 Roy Staiger; 11 Fred Stanley; 24 Dennis Werth	Outfielders: 26 Juan Beníquez; 2 Paul Blair; 58 Bobby Brown; 17 Oscar Gamble; 44 Reggie Jackson; 27 Jay Johnstone; 2,27 Darryl Jones; 27,2 Bobby Murcer; 14 Lou Piniella; 34 Lenny Randle; 17 Mickey Rivers; 6 Roy White	Manager: 21 Bob Lemon; 1 Billy Martin; Coaches: 8 Yogi Berra; 33 Mike Ferraro; Art Fowler; 50 Jim Hegan; 32 Elston Howard; 39 Charley Lau; 42 Tom Morgan

== Player stats ==
=== Batting ===
==== Starters by position ====
Note: Pos = Position; G = Games played; AB = At bats; H = Hits; Avg. = Batting average; HR = Home runs; RBI = Runs batted in

Pos	Player	G	AB	H	Avg.	HR	RBI
C	Thurman Munson	97	382	110	.288	3	39
1B	Chris Chambliss	149	554	155	.280	18	63
2B	Willie Randolph	153	574	155	.270	5	61
3B	Graig Nettles	145	521	132	.253	20	73
SS	Bucky Dent	141	431	99	.230	2	32
LF	Lou Piniella	130	461	137	.297	11	69
CF	Mickey Rivers	74	286	82	.287	3	25
RF	Reggie Jackson	131	465	138	.297	29	89
DH	Jim Spencer	106	295	85	.288	23	53

==== Other batters ====
Note: G = Games played; AB = At bats; H = Hits; Avg. = Batting average; HR = Home runs; RBI = Runs batted in

Player	G	AB	H	Avg.	HR	RBI
Bobby Murcer	74	264	72	.273	8	33
Roy White	81	205	44	.215	3	27
Juan Beníquez	62	142	36	.254	4	17
Jerry Narron	61	123	21	.171	4	18
Oscar Gamble	36	113	44	.389	11	32
Fred Stanley	57	100	20	.200	2	14
Brad Gulden	40	92	15	.163	0	6
Bobby Brown	30	68	17	.250	0	3
Cliff Johnson	28	64	17	.266	2	6
Jay Johnstone	23	48	10	.208	1	7
Darryl Jones	18	47	12	.255	0	6
George Scott	16	44	14	.318	1	6
Lenny Randle	20	39	7	.179	0	3
Dámaso García	11	38	10	.263	0	4
Brian Doyle	20	32	4	.125	0	5
Bruce Robinson	6	12	2	.167	0	2
Roy Staiger	4	11	3	.273	0	1
Paul Blair	2	5	1	.200	0	0
Dennis Werth	3	4	1	.250	0	0

=== Pitching ===
==== Starting pitchers ====
Note: G = Games pitched; IP = Innings pitched; W = Wins; L = Losses; ERA = Earned run average; SO = Strikeouts

Player	G	IP	W	L	ERA	SO
Tommy John	37	276.1	21	9	2.96	111
Ron Guidry	33	236.1	18	8	2.78	201
Luis Tiant	30	195.2	13	8	3.91	104
Catfish Hunter	19	105.0	2	9	5.31	34
Ed Figueroa	16	104.2	4	6	4.13	42
Jim Beattie	15	76.0	3	6	5.21	32
Dave Righetti	3	17.1	0	1	3.63	13

==== Other pitchers ====
Note: G = Games pitched; IP = Innings pitched; W = Wins; L = Losses; ERA = Earned run average; SO = Strikeouts

Player	G	IP	W	L	ERA	SO
Ken Clay	32	78.1	1	7	5.40	28
Don Hood	27	67.1	3	1	3.07	22

==== Relief pitchers ====
Note: G = Games pitched; W = Wins; L = Losses; SV = Saves; ERA = Earned run average; SO = Strikeouts

Player	G	W	L	SV	ERA	SO
Rich Gossage	36	5	3	18	2.62	41
Ron Davis	44	14	2	9	2.85	43
Jim Kaat	40	2	3	2	3.86	23
Ray Burris	15	1	3	0	6.18	19
Dick Tidrow	14	2	1	2	7.94	7
Paul Mirabella	10	0	4	0	8.79	4
Mike Griffin	3	0	0	0	4.15	5
Rick Anderson	1	0	0	0	3.86	0
Roger Slagle	1	0	0	0	0.00	2
Bob Kammeyer	1	0	0	0	inf	0

== Awards and honors ==
=== All-Stars ===
- Ron Guidry, reserve
- Reggie Jackson, reserve
- Tommy John, reserve
- Graig Nettles, reserve

== Farm system ==
Level	Team	League	Manager
AAA	Columbus Clippers	International League	Gene Michael
AA	West Haven Yankees	Eastern League	Stump Merrill
A	Fort Lauderdale Yankees	Florida State League	Doug Holmquist
A-Short Season	Oneonta Yankees	New York–Penn League	Art Mazmanian
Rookie	Paintsville Yankees	Appalachian League	Bill Livesey

LEAGUE CHAMPIONS: Columbus, West Haven, Oneonta, Paintsville

=== Off-season ===
On October 23, manager Billy Martin got into a barroom fight with Joseph Cooper, a marshmallow salesman from Minnesota. Six days later, Martin was fired from the Yankees by George Steinbrenner and replaced with Dick Howser.
