= 1979 Texas Rangers season =

1979 Texas Rangers
- League: American League
- Division: West
- Ballpark: Arlington Stadium
- City: Arlington, Texas
- Record: 83–79 (.512)
- Divisional place: 3rd
- Owner: Bradford G. Corbett
- General managers: Eddie Robinson
- Managers: Pat Corrales
- Television: KXAS-TV (Jon Miller, Frank Glieber, Eric Nadel)
- Radio: WBAP (Jon Miller, Bill Merrill)

The 1979 Texas Rangers season was the 19th of the Texas Rangers franchise overall, their 8th in Arlington as the Rangers, and the 8th season at Arlington Stadium. The Rangers finished third in the American League West with a record of 83 wins and 79 losses.

== Offseason ==
- October 3, 1978: Len Barker and Bobby Bonds were traded by the Rangers to the Cleveland Indians for Larvell Blanks and Jim Kern. Bobby Cuellar and Dave Rivera were sent to Cleveland to complete the August 31, 1978 trade for Johnny Grubb.
- October 24, 1978: Sandy Alomar Sr. was released by the Rangers.
- October 25, 1978: Mike Hargrove, Kurt Bevacqua, and Bill Fahey were traded by the Rangers to the San Diego Padres for Oscar Gamble, Dave Roberts and $300,000.
- November 10, 1978: Dave Righetti, Juan Beníquez, Mike Griffin, Paul Mirabella, and Greg Jemison (minors) were traded by the Rangers to the New York Yankees for Domingo Ramos, Mike Heath, Sparky Lyle, Larry McCall, Dave Rajsich, and cash.
- December 8, 1978: Jim Mason was traded by the Rangers to the Montreal Expos for Mike Hart.

== Regular season ==
- June 24, 1979: Rickey Henderson made his major league debut for the Oakland Athletics in a game against the Rangers. Henderson had 4 at bats with 2 hits, and 1 stolen base.

=== Season standings ===
AL West
Team	W	L	Pct.	GB	Home	Road
California Angels	88	74	.543	—	49‍–‍32	39‍–‍42
Kansas City Royals	85	77	.525	3	46‍–‍35	39‍–‍42
Texas Rangers	83	79	.512	5	44‍–‍37	39‍–‍42
Minnesota Twins	82	80	.506	6	39‍–‍42	43‍–‍38
Chicago White Sox	73	87	.456	14	33‍–‍46	40‍–‍41
Seattle Mariners	67	95	.414	21	36‍–‍45	31‍–‍50
Oakland Athletics	54	108	.333	34	31‍–‍50	23‍–‍58

=== Record vs. opponents ===
1979 American League record Sources:
Team	BAL	BOS	CAL	CWS	CLE	DET	KC	MIL	MIN	NYY	OAK	SEA	TEX	TOR
Baltimore	—	8–5	9–3	8–3	8–5	7–6	6–6	8–5	8–4	5–6	8–4	10–2	6–6	11–2
Boston	5–8	—	5–7	5–6	6–7	8–5	8–4	8–4	9–3	5–8	9–3	8–4	6–6	9–4
California	3–9	7–5	—	9–4	6–6	4–8	7–6	7–5	9–4	7–5	10–3	7–6	5–8	7–5
Chicago	3–8	6–5	4–9	—	6–6	3–9	5–8	5–7	5–8	4–8	9–4	5–8	11–2	7–5
Cleveland	5–8	7–6	6–6	6–6	—	6–6	6–6	4–9	8–4	5–8	8–4	7–5	5–7	8–5
Detroit	6–7	5–8	8–4	9–3	6–6	—	5–7	6–7	4–8	7–6	7–5	7–5	6–6	9–4
Kansas City	6–6	4–8	6–7	8–5	6–6	7–5	—	5–7	7–6	5–7	9–4	7–6	6–7	9–3
Milwaukee	5–8	4–8	5–7	7–5	9–4	7–6	7–5	—	8–4	9–4	6–6	9–3	9–3	10–3
Minnesota	4–8	3–9	4–9	8–5	4–8	8–4	6–7	4–8	—	7–5	9–4	10–3	4–9	11–1
New York	6–5	8–5	5–7	8–4	8–5	6–7	7–5	4–9	5–7	—	9–3	6–6	8–4	9–4
Oakland	4–8	3–9	3–10	4–9	4–8	5–7	4–9	6–6	4–9	3–9	—	8–5	2–11	4–8
Seattle	2–10	4–8	6–7	8–5	5–7	5–7	6–7	3–9	3–10	6–6	5–8	—	6–7	8–4
Texas	6–6	6–6	8–5	2–11	7–5	6–6	7–6	3–9	9–4	4–8	11–2	7–6	—	7–5
Toronto	2–11	4–9	5–7	5–7	5–8	4–9	3–9	3–10	1–11	4–9	8–4	4–8	5–7	—

=== Notable transactions ===
- May 4, 1979: Bert Campaneris was traded by the Rangers to the California Angels for Dave Chalk.
- June 15, 1979: Dock Ellis was traded by the Rangers to the New York Mets for Bob Myrick and Mike Bruhert.
- June 15, 1979: Eric Soderholm was traded by the Chicago White Sox to the Texas Rangers for Ed Farmer and Gary Holle.
- August 1, 1979: Oscar Gamble, Amos Lewis (minors) and players to be named later were traded by the Rangers to the New York Yankees for Mickey Rivers and players to be named later. The Rangers completed the deal by sending Ray Fontenot and Gene Nelson to the Yankees on October 8. The Yankees completed the deal by sending Bob Polinsky (minors), Neal Mersch (minors), and Mark Softy (minors) to the Rangers on October 8.

=== Roster ===
1979 Texas Rangers
Roster
Pitchers: 33 Doyle Alexander; 23 Brian Allard; 17,20 Bob Babcock; 11 Steve Comer; 44 Danny Darwin; 17 Dock Ellis; 30 Ed Farmer; 27 Jerry Don Gleaton; 31 Fergie Jenkins; 38 John Henry Johnson; 34 Jim Kern; 28 Sparky Lyle; 32 Jon Matlack; 29 Larry McCall; 42 Doc Medich; 26 Dave Rajsich	Catchers: 30 Greg Mahlberg; 14 Dave Roberts; 10 Jim Sundberg; Infielders: 25 Buddy Bell; 3 Larvell Blanks; 19 Bert Campaneris; 12 Dave Chalk; 24 Gary Holle; 35 Mike Jorgensen; 24 Willie Montañez; 4 Nelson Norman; 18 Pat Putnam; 12 Eric Soderholm; 1 Bump Wills	Outfielders: 6 Johnny Grubb; 0 Al Oliver; 17 Mickey Rivers; 5 Billy Sample; 15 La Rue Washington; 22 Richie Zisk; Other batters: 9 John Ellis; 7 Oscar Gamble; 23 Gary Gray	Manager: 45 Pat Corrales; Coaches: 49 Jackie Brown; 47 Fred Koenig; 48 Frank Lucchesi; 8 Connie Ryan

== Player stats ==
= Indicates team leader

=== Batting ===
==== Starters by position ====
Note: Pos = Position; G = Games played; AB = At bats; H = Hits; Avg. = Batting average; HR = Home runs; RBI = Runs batted in

Pos	Player	G	AB	H	Avg.	HR	RBI
C	Jim Sundberg	150	495	136	.275	5	64
1B	Pat Putnam	139	426	118	.277	18	64
2B	Bump Wills	146	543	148	.273	5	46
SS	Nelson Norman	147	343	76	.222	0	21
3B	Buddy Bell	162	670	200	.299	18	101
LF	Billy Sample	128	325	95	.292	5	35
CF	Al Oliver	136	492	159	.323	12	76
RF	Richie Zisk	144	503	132	.262	18	64
DH	John Ellis	111	316	90	.285	12	61

==== Other batters ====
Note: G = Games played; AB = At bats; H = Hits; Avg. = Batting average; HR = Home runs; RBI = Runs batted in

Player	G	AB	H	Avg.	HR	RBI
Johnny Grubb	102	289	79	.273	10	37
Mickey Rivers	58	247	74	.300	6	25
Oscar Gamble	64	161	54	.335	8	32
Mike Jorgensen	90	157	35	.223	6	16
Eric Soderholm	63	147	40	.272	4	19
Willie Montañez	38	144	46	.319	8	24
Larvell Blanks	68	120	24	.200	1	15
Dave Roberts	44	84	22	.262	3	14
Gary Gray	16	42	10	.238	0	1
LaRue Washington	25	18	5	.278	0	2
Greg Mahlberg	7	17	2	.118	1	1
Bert Campaneris	8	9	1	.111	0	0
Dave Chalk	9	8	2	.250	0	0
Gary Holle	5	6	1	.167	0	0

=== Pitching ===
==== Starting pitchers ====
Note: G = Games pitched; IP = Innings pitched; W = Wins; L = Losses; ERA = Earned run average; SO = Strikeouts

Player	G	IP	W	L	ERA	SO
Ferguson Jenkins	37	259.0	16	14	4.07	164
Steve Comer	36	242.1	17	12	3.68	86
Doc Medich	29	149.0	10	7	4.17	58
Doyle Alexander	23	113.1	5	7	4.45	50
Jon Matlack	13	85.0	5	4	4.13	35
John Henry Johnson	17	82.1	2	6	4.92	46
Dock Ellis	10	46.2	1	5	5.98	10

==== Other pitchers ====
Note: G = Games pitched; IP = Innings pitched; W = Wins; L = Losses; ERA = Earned run average; SO = Strikeouts

Player	G	IP	W	L	ERA	SO
Danny Darwin	20	78.0	4	4	4.04	58
Brian Allard	7	33.1	1	3	4.32	14
Ed Farmer	11	33.0	2	0	4.36	25
Jerry Don Gleaton	5	9.2	0	1	6.52	2
Larry McCall	2	8.1	1	0	2.16	3

==== Relief pitchers ====
Note: G = Games pitched; W = Wins; L = Losses; SV = Saves; ERA = Earned run average; SO = Strikeouts

Player	G	W	L	SV	ERA	SO
Jim Kern	71	13	5	29	1.57	136
Sparky Lyle	67	5	8	13	3.13	48
Dave Rajsich	27	1	3	0	3.52	32
Bob Babcock	4	0	0	0	10.12	6

=== Awards and honors ===
- Jim Kern, Rolaids Relief Man of the Year Award
- Buddy Bell, 3B, Gold Glove
- Jim Sundberg, C, Gold Glove

=== All-Stars ===
All-Star Game

== Farm system ==
Level	Team	League	Manager
AAA	Tucson Toros	Pacific Coast League	Rich Donnelly
AA	Tulsa Drillers	Texas League	Jimmie Schaffer
A	Asheville Tourists	Western Carolinas League	Wayne Terwilliger
Rookie	GCL Rangers	Gulf Coast League	Andy Hancock
