= 1980 New York Yankees season =

Season for the Major League Baseball team the New York Yankees

1980 New York Yankees
- American League East champions
- League: American League
- Division: East
- Ballpark: Yankee Stadium
- City: New York City
- Record: 103-59 (.636)
- Owners: George Steinbrenner
- General managers: Gene Michael
- Managers: Dick Howser
- Television: WPIX; SportsChannel NY (Phil Rizzuto, Frank Messer, Bill White)
- Radio: WINS (AM) (Frank Messer, Phil Rizzuto, Bill White, Fran Healy)

The 1980 New York Yankees season was the 78th season for the franchise. The team finished with a record of 103–59, finishing in first place in the American League East, 3 games ahead of the Baltimore Orioles. The Kansas City Royals swept the Yankees in the ALCS. New York was managed by Dick Howser. The Yankees played at Yankee Stadium.

== Offseason ==
- November 1, 1979: Chris Chambliss, Dámaso García, and Paul Mirabella were traded by the Yankees to the Toronto Blue Jays for Rick Cerone, Tom Underwood and Ted Wilborn.
- November 1, 1979: Jim Beattie, Rick Anderson, Juan Beníquez, and Jerry Narron were traded by the Yankees to the Seattle Mariners for Ruppert Jones and Jim Lewis.
- November 8, 1979: Bob Watson was signed as a free agent by the Yankees.
- November 8, 1979: Rudy May was signed as a free agent by the Yankees.
- November 14, 1979: The Yankees traded players to be named later and cash to the Texas Rangers for Eric Soderholm. The Yankees sent Amos Lewis (minors) and Ricky Burdette (minors) to the Rangers on December 13 to complete the trade.
- December 10, 1979: Andre Robertson was purchased by the Yankees from the Toronto Blue Jays.

=== Spring training ===
The Yankees played two spring training exhibition games at the Louisiana Superdome over the weekend of March 15 and 16, 1980. 45,152 spectators watched the Yankees beat the Baltimore Orioles 9–3 on March 15, 1980. The following day, 43,339 fans saw Floyd Rayford lead the Orioles to a 7–1 win over the Yankees.

== Regular season ==
=== Season standings ===
AL East
Team	W	L	Pct.	GB	Home	Road
New York Yankees	103	59	.636	—	53‍–‍28	50‍–‍31
Baltimore Orioles	100	62	.617	3	50‍–‍31	50‍–‍31
Milwaukee Brewers	86	76	.531	17	40‍–‍42	46‍–‍34
Boston Red Sox	83	77	.519	19	36‍–‍45	47‍–‍32
Detroit Tigers	84	78	.519	19	43‍–‍38	41‍–‍40
Cleveland Indians	79	81	.494	23	44‍–‍35	35‍–‍46
Toronto Blue Jays	67	95	.414	36	35‍–‍46	32‍–‍49

=== Record vs. opponents ===
1980 American League record Sources:
Team	BAL	BOS	CAL	CWS	CLE	DET	KC	MIL	MIN	NYY	OAK	SEA	TEX	TOR
Baltimore	—	8–5	10–2	6–6	6–7	10–3	6–6	7–6	10–2	7–6	7–5	6–6	6–6	11–2
Boston	5–8	—	9–3	6–4	7–6	8–5	5–7	6–7	6–6	3–10	9–3	7–5	5–7	7–6
California	2–10	3–9	—	3–10	4–6	5–7	5–8	6–6	7–6	2–10	3–10	11–2	11–2	3–9
Chicago	6–6	4–6	10–3	—	5–7	2–10	5–8	5–7	5–8	5–7	6–7	6–7	6–7–2	5–7
Cleveland	7–6	6–7	6–4	7–5	—	3–10	5–7	3–10	9–3	5–8	6–6	8–4	6–6	8–5
Detroit	3–10	5–8	7–5	10–2	10–3	—	2–10	7–6	6–6	5–8	6–6	10–2–1	4–8	9–4
Kansas City	6–6	7–5	8–5	8–5	7–5	10–2	—	6–6	5–8	8–4	6–7	7–6	10–3	9–3
Milwaukee	6–7	7–6	6–6	7–5	10–3	6–7	6–6	—	7–5	5–8	7–5	9–3	5–7	5–8
Minnesota	2–10	6–6	6–7	8–5	3–9	6–6	8–5	5–7	—	4–8	6–7	7–6	9–3	7–5
New York	6–7	10–3	10–2	7–5	8–5	8–5	4–8	8–5	8–4	—	8–4	9–3	7–5	10–3
Oakland	5–7	3–9	10–3	7–6	6–6	6–6	7–6	5–7	7–6	4–8	—	8–5	7–6	8–4
Seattle	6–6	5–7	2–11	7–6	4–8	2–10–1	6–7	3–9	6–7	3–9	5–8	—	4–9	6–6
Texas	6–6	7–5	2–11	7–6–2	6–6	8–4	3–10	7–5	3–9	5–7	6–7	9–4	—	7–5
Toronto	2–11	6–7	9–3	7–5	5–8	4–9	3–9	8–5	5–7	3–10	4–8	6–6	5–7	—

=== Notable transactions ===
- April 1, 1980: Jim Kaat was signed as a free agent by the Yankees.
- April 4, 1980: Johnny Oates was signed as a free agent by the Yankees.
- April 30, 1980: Jim Kaat was purchased from the Yankees by the St. Louis Cardinals.
- May 28, 1980: Paul Blair was signed as a free agent by the Yankees.
- July 1, 1980: Paul Blair was released by the Yankees.
- August 1, 1980: José Rijo was signed by the Yankees as an amateur free agent.
- August 14, 1980: Ken Clay and a player to be named later were traded by the Yankees to the Texas Rangers for Gaylord Perry. The Yankees completed the deal by sending Marvin Thompson (minors) to the Rangers on October 1.

=== Roster ===
1980 New York Yankees
Roster
Pitchers: 43 Doug Bird; 39 Ron Davis; 31 Ed Figueroa; 54 Goose Gossage; 52 Mike Griffin; 49 Ron Guidry; 25 Tommy John; 36 Jim Kaat; 53 Tim Lollar; 45 Rudy May; 36 Gaylord Perry; 23 Luis Tiant; 38 Tom Underwood	Catchers: 10 Rick Cerone; 19 Brad Gulden; 26 Johnny Oates; 47 Bruce Robinson; Infielders: 61 Marshall Brant; 20 Bucky Dent; 18 Brian Doyle; 55 Roger Holt; 9 Graig Nettles; 30 Willie Randolph; 27 Aurelio Rodríguez; 57 Dennis Sherrill; 21 Eric Soderholm; 12 Jim Spencer; 11 Fred Stanley; 28 Bob Watson; 24 Dennis Werth	Outfielders: 27 Paul Blair; 13 Bobby Brown; 17 Oscar Gamble; 44 Reggie Jackson; 22 Ruppert Jones; 46 Joe Lefebvre; 2 Bobby Murcer; 14 Lou Piniella; 56,59 Ted Wilborn	Manager: 34 Dick Howser; Coaches: 8 Yogi Berra; 33 Mike Ferraro; 48 Jim Hegan; 40 Charley Lau; 41 Jeff Torborg; 42 Stan Williams

== Game log ==
=== Regular season ===
1980 regular season game log: 103–59 (Home: 53–28; Away: 50–31)
April: 9–9 (Home: 5–4; Away: 4–5)

#	Date	Time (ET)	Opponent	Score	Win	Loss	Save	Time of Game	Attendance	Record	Box/ Streak	GB
1	April 10	8:35 p.m. EST	@ Rangers	0–1 (12)	Lyle (1–0)	**Underwood** (0–1)		2:39	33,196	0–1	L1	-1
2	April 11	8:35 p.m. EST	@ Rangers	7–11	Jenkins (1–0)	**Davis** (0–1)	Rajsich (1)	2:18	21,424	0–2	L2	-1½
–	April 12	–	@ Rangers	Postponed (rain); Makeup: April 13								
3	April 13 (1)	4:35 p.m. EST	@ Rangers	9–4	**Tiant** (1–0)	Comer (0–1)		2:39	–	1–2	W1	-½

May: 19–7 (Home: 9–5; Away: 10–2)

#	Date	Time (ET)	Opponent	Score	Win	Loss	Save	Time of Game	Attendance	Record	Box/ Streak	GB

June: 19–9 (Home: 10–4; Away: 9–5)

#	Date	Time (ET)	Opponent	Score	Win	Loss	Save	Time of Game	Attendance	Record	Box/ Streak	GB

July: 16–12 (Home: 5–5; Away: 11–7)

#	Date	Time (ET)	Opponent	Score	Win	Loss	Save	Time of Game	Attendance	Record	Box/ Streak	GB
–	July 8		**1980 Major League Baseball All-Star Game** at Dodger Stadium in Los Angeles									

August: 15–14 (Home: 7–6; Away: 8–8)

#	Date	Time (ET)	Opponent	Score	Win	Loss	Save	Time of Game	Attendance	Record	Box/ Streak	GB

September: 21–7 (Home: 14–3; Away: 7–4)

#	Date	Time (ET)	Opponent	Score	Win	Loss	Save	Time of Game	Attendance	Record	Box/ Streak	GB

October: 4–1 (Home: 3–1; Away: 1–0)

#	Date	Time (ET)	Opponent	Score	Win	Loss	Save	Time of Game	Attendance	Record	Box/ Streak	GB

Legend: = Win = Loss = Postponement
Bold = Yankees team member

=== Postseason Game log ===
1980 Postseason game log: 0–3 (Home: 0–1; Away: 0–2)
AL Championship Series: vs. Kansas City Royals 0–3 (Home: 0–1; Away: 0–2)

#	Date	Time (ET)	Opponent	Score	Win	Loss	Save	Time of Game	Attendance	Record	Box/ Streak

Legend: = Win = Loss
Bold = Yankees team member

== Player stats ==
= Indicates team leader

= Indicates league leader

=== Batting ===
==== Starters by position ====
Note: Pos = Position; G = Games played; AB = At bats; H = Hits; Avg. = Batting average; HR = Home runs; RBI = Runs batted in

Bold indicates American League All-Star.

Pos	Player	G	AB	H	Avg.	HR	RBI
C	Rick Cerone	147	519	144	.277	14	85
1B	Bob Watson	130	469	144	.307	13	68
2B	**Willie Randolph**	138	513	151	.294	7	46
3B	**Graig Nettles**	89	324	79	.244	16	45
SS	**Bucky Dent**	141	489	128	.262	5	52
LF	Lou Piniella	116	321	92	.287	2	27
CF	Bobby Brown	137	412	107	.260	14	47
RF	**Reggie Jackson**	143	514	154	.300	41	111
DH	Eric Soderholm	95	275	79	.287	11	35

==== Other batters ====
Note: G = Games played; AB = At bats; H = Hits; Avg. = Batting average; HR = Home runs; RBI = Runs batted in

Player	G	AB	H	Avg.	HR	RBI
Ruppert Jones	83	328	73	.223	9	42
Bobby Murcer	100	297	80	.269	13	57
Jim Spencer	97	259	61	.236	13	43
Oscar Gamble	78	194	54	.278	14	50
Aurelio Rodríguez	52	164	36	.220	3	14
Joe Lefebvre	74	150	34	.227	8	21
Fred Stanley	49	86	18	.209	0	5
Brian Doyle	34	75	13	.173	1	5
Dennis Werth	39	65	20	.308	3	12
Johnny Oates	39	64	12	.188	1	3
Ted Wilborn	8	8	2	.250	0	1
Roger Holt	2	6	1	.167	0	1
Marshall Brant	3	6	0	.000	0	0
Bruce Robinson	4	5	0	.000	0	0
Dennis Sherrill	3	4	1	.250	0	0
Brad Gulden	2	3	1	.333	1	2
Paul Blair	12	2	0	.000	0	0

=== Pitching ===
==== Starting pitchers ====
Note: G = Games pitched; IP = Innings pitched; W = Wins; L = Losses; ERA = Earned run average; SO = Strikeouts

Bold indicates American League All-Star.

Player	G	IP	W	L	ERA	SO
**Tommy John**	36	265 1/3	22	9	3.43	78
Ron Guidry	37	219 2/3	17	10	3.56	166
Tom Underwood	38	187	13	9	3.66	116
Rudy May	41	175 1/3	15	5	2.46	133
Luis Tiant	25	136 1/3	8	9	4.89	84

==== Other pitchers ====
Note: G = Games pitched; IP = Innings pitched; W = Wins; L = Losses; ERA = Earned run average; SO = Strikeouts

Player	G	IP	W	L	ERA	SO
Ed Figueroa	15	58	3	3	6.98	16
Mike Griffin	13	54	2	4	4.83	25
Gaylord Perry	10	50 2/3	4	4	4.44	28

==== Relief pitchers ====
Note: G = Games pitched; W = Wins; L = Losses; SV = Saves; ERA = Earned run average; SO = Strikeouts

Player	G	W	L	SV	ERA	SO
Goose Gossage	64	6	2	33	2.27	103
Ron Davis	53	9	3	7	2.95	65
Doug Bird	22	3	0	1	2.66	17
Tim Lollar	14	1	0	2	3.34	13
Jim Kaat	4	0	1	0	7.20	1

== ALCS ==
=== Game 1 ===
October 8 Royals Stadium

Team	1	2	3	4	5	6	7	8	9	R	H	E
New York	0	2	0	0	0	0	0	0	0	2	10	1
Kansas City	0	2	2	0	0	0	1	2	X	7	10	0
W: Larry Gura (1–0) L: Ron Guidry (0–1)
HRs: NYY – Rick Cerone (1) Lou Piniella (1) KCR – George Brett (1)

=== Game 2 ===
October 9 Royals Stadium

Team	1	2	3	4	5	6	7	8	9	R	H	E
New York	0	0	0	0	2	0	0	0	0	2	8	0
Kansas City	0	0	3	0	0	0	0	0	X	3	6	0
W: Dennis Leonard (1–0) L: Rudy May (0–1) S: Dan Quisenberry (1)
HRs: NYY – Graig Nettles

=== Game 3 ===
October 10 Yankee Stadium

Team	1	2	3	4	5	6	7	8	9	R	H	E
Kansas City	0	0	0	0	1	0	3	0	0	4	12	1
New York	0	0	0	0	0	2	0	0	0	2	8	0
W: Dan Quisenberry (1–0) L: Rich Gossage (0–1)
HRs: KCR – George Brett (2) Frank White (1)

== Awards and honors ==
Bucky Dent, Goose Gossage, Reggie Jackson, Tommy John, Graig Nettles and Willie Randolph represented the Yankees at the 1980 Major League Baseball All-Star Game.

Randolph earned the inaugural Silver Slugger Award at second base.

== Farm system ==
Level	Team	League	Manager
AAA	Columbus Clippers	International League	Joe Altobelli
AA	Nashville Sounds	Southern League	Stump Merrill
A	Fort Lauderdale Yankees	Florida State League	Doug Holmquist
A	Greensboro Hornets	South Atlantic League	Bob Schaefer
A-Short Season	Oneonta Yankees	New York–Penn League	Art Mazmanian
Rookie	Paintsville Yankees	Appalachian League	Mike Easom
Rookie	GCL Yankees	Gulf Coast League	Carlos Tosca

LEAGUE CHAMPIONS: Columbus, Fort Lauderdale, Greensboro, Oneonta, Paintsville
