= The Bronx Zoo (disambiguation) =

The Bronx Zoo may refer to:

- The Bronx Zoo, an urban zoo in New York City
- The Bronx Zoo (book), book about the New York Yankees by Sparky Lyle
- The Bronx Zoo (TV series), a short lived television series
- The Bronx Zoo (baseball), an era of the New York Yankees consisting of Reggie Jackson, Thurman Munson, Billy Martin, and George Steinbrenner
- A nickname for the original Yankee Stadium
