= Domingo Ramos =

Dominican baseball player (born 1958)

- Ramos (kneeling, center) and Andre Dawson (left) on April 8, 1989.
- Infielder
- Born: March 29, 1958 (age 68); Santiago de los Caballeros, Dominican Republic
- Batted: Right Threw: Right

MLB debut
- September 8, 1978, for the New York Yankees

Last MLB appearance
- October 3, 1990, for the Chicago Cubs

MLB statistics
- Batting average: .240
- Home runs: 8
- Runs batted in: 85
- Stats at Baseball Reference

Teams
- New York Yankees (1978); Toronto Blue Jays (1980); Seattle Mariners (1982–1987); Cleveland Indians (1988); California Angels (1988); Chicago Cubs (1989–1990)

Domingo Antonio Ramos (born March 29, 1958) is a Dominican former professional baseball player who was an infielder in Major League Baseball (MLB) from 1978 to 1990.

Ramos signed with the New York Yankees in 1975 and made his MLB debut in 1978. After that season, the Yankees traded him with Dave Rajsich, Larry McCall, Sparky Lyle, Mike Heath, and cash to Texas Rangers for Greg Jemison, Paul Mirabella, Mike Griffin, Juan Beniquez, and Dave Righetti.

Ramos earned his first career MLB hit on May 23, 1980. On June 26, 1982, he recorded his first career RBI. His first career home run came on an April 17, 1983, in a 7–4 loss against the Oakland Athletics. His first career stolen base came two days later, in a 6–2 loss at the Minnesota Twins. His first career four-hit game came on September 8, 1987, in a 7–0 win over the Cleveland Indians.

In late 1981, he was selected by the Seattle Mariners from the Toronto Blue Jays in the Rule 5 draft. In 1982 with the Mariners, he filled in at all four infield positions.

Ramos hit.283 in 1983 and .311 in 1987. He played in a career-high 75 MLB games in 1985.
