= Sparky Lyle =

American baseball player (born 1944)

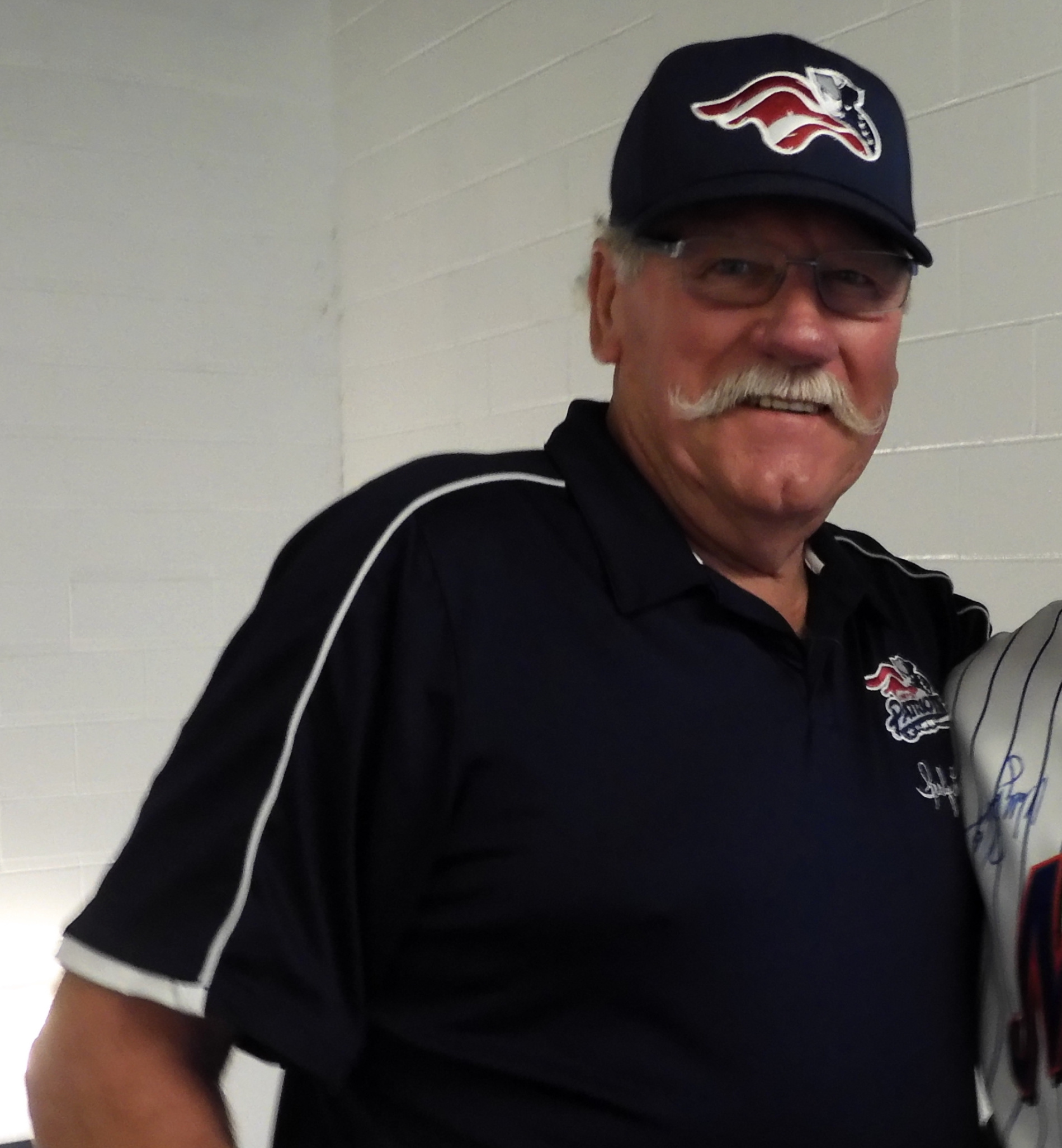
- Lyle at TD Bank Ballpark in 2019
- Pitcher
- Born: July 22, 1944 (age 82); DuBois, Pennsylvania, U.S.
- Batted: Left Threw: Left

MLB debut
- July 4, 1967, for the Boston Red Sox

Last MLB appearance
- September 27, 1982, for the Chicago White Sox

MLB statistics
- Win–loss record: 99–76
- Earned run average: 2.88
- Strikeouts: 873
- Saves: 238
- Stats at Baseball Reference

Teams
- Boston Red Sox (1967–1971); New York Yankees (1972–1978); Texas Rangers (1979–1980); Philadelphia Phillies (1980–1982); Chicago White Sox (1982)

Career highlights and awards
- 3× All-Star (1973, 1976, 1977); 2× World Series champion (1977, 1978); AL Cy Young Award (1977); 2× AL saves leader (1972, 1976)

Albert Walter "Sparky" Lyle (born July 22, 1944) is an American former professional baseball pitcher who spent sixteen seasons in Major League Baseball (MLB) from 1967 through 1982. He was a relief pitcher for the Boston Red Sox, New York Yankees, Texas Rangers, Philadelphia Phillies, and Chicago White Sox.

A three-time All-Star, he won the Cy Young Award in 1977, the first American League reliever so honored. He led the AL in saves in 1972 and 1976. With the Yankees, Lyle was a member of the World Series champions in 1977 and 1978, both over the Los Angeles Dodgers. Lyle holds the distinction of having the most career wins of any pitcher to never pitch a game as a starter.

Lyle co-authored, with Peter Golenbock, The Bronx Zoo, a 1979 tell-all book that chronicled the dissension within the Yankees in its World Series Championship seasons of 1977 and 1978. From 1998 to 2012, Lyle served as manager of the Somerset Patriots, an independent baseball team of the Atlantic League of Professional Baseball.

Lyle is credited, alongside Rollie Fingers, with expanding the role and importance of the reliever in professional baseball beginning in the 1970s.

== Early life and career ==
Lyle was born in DuBois, Pennsylvania, on July 22, 1944, and grew up in nearby Reynoldsville. His father was a carpenter and general contractor, and his mother a seamstress at a coffin factory. He attended Reynoldsville High School where he played varsity football and basketball. During the spring of his junior year, he began playing American Legion baseball for the DuBois team because neither his high school nor Reynoldsville fielded an organized baseball squad.

He struck out 31 batters while pitching 14 of 17 innings in a state tournament game for DuBois. At the time, his pitching repertoire consisted of a fastball, curveball and changeup. He was brought in for a tryout with the Pittsburgh Pirates alongside Bruce Dal Canton. The Pirates signed only the latter after seeing that the speed of Lyle's pitches was no match for Dal Canton's. Lyle did succeed in catching the attention of George Staller who was a scout for the Baltimore Orioles at the time. Lyle signed with the ballclub as an amateur free agent on June 17, 1964.

He spent the opening half of his first professional campaign in 1964 with the Bluefield Orioles. He appeared in seven games, three out of the bullpen. It was the first time he was used as a reliever, an idea which he suggested to manager Jim Frey. Later that season, he would earn a promotion to the Fox Cities Foxes, where he was used exclusively as a starting pitcher in six games for the eventual Midwest League champions.

== Boston Red Sox ==
Lyle was selected by the Boston Red Sox in the first-year draft on November 30, 1964. He progressed up the Red Sox farm system as a relief pitcher, with stops in Winston-Salem in 1965, Pittsfield in 1966 and Toronto in the first half of 1967. It was during his time at Pittsfield that he picked up the slider, a pitch that was introduced to him by Ted Williams at spring training prior to that season. Lyle recalled, "He told me it was the best pitch in baseball because it was the only pitch he couldn't hit even when he knew it was coming." The slider became the most successful pitch in his repertoire.

He was called up to Boston after Dennis Bennett was sold to the New York Mets on June 24, 1967. Lyle pitched two scoreless innings to close out a 4–3 Red Sox loss to the California Angels in his major-league debut at Anaheim Stadium on July 4. He recorded his first career save twelve days later on July 16 in Boston's 9–5 victory over the Detroit Tigers at Fenway Park. His first win in the majors came on July 27 in the Red Sox's ten-inning 6–5 triumph at home over the Angels. He ended his rookie campaign with 27 mound appearances, a 1–2 record, five saves and a 2.28 earned run average (ERA). He was left off Boston's World Series roster due to a sore arm.

He registered 64 saves during the next four years, serving as the team's closer from 1969 to 1971.

== New York Yankees ==
During spring training prior to the 1972 season on March 22, Lyle was traded to the New York Yankees for Danny Cater and a player to be named later (Mario Guerrero). The transaction proved to be one-sided as Lyle became the Yankees' bullpen ace, establishing himself as one of the best relief pitchers of the 1970s. He played a major role in the Yankees' three straight pennants from 1976 to 1978, and World Series titles in the last two of those years. In 1972, he saved 35 games, an American League record, and a major league record for left-handers; Ron Perranoski had set both marks in 1970, but John Hiller would surpass Lyle's total with 38 in 1973. In 1972, Lyle also became the first southpaw to collect 100 saves in the American League. He also finished third in the 1972 MVP voting.

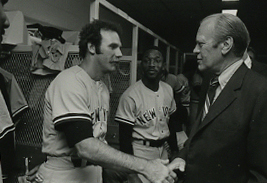
Lyle (left) shaking hands with President Gerald Ford in 1976

Lyle again led the league in saves in 1976, and in 1977 became the first AL reliever to win the Cy Young Award. He was named an American League All-Star in 1973, 1976 and 1977. In 1976, he broke Hoyt Wilhelm's American League record of 154 career saves, and the following year eclipsed Perranoski's major league mark for left-handers of 179 career saves. Through 1977, Lyle had compiled 201 career saves, and was within range of Wilhelm's career big-league record of 227. Lyle was associated with a trademark song to herald his entry into games, Pomp and Circumstance March No. 1 in D.

But despite Lyle's 1977 Cy Young Award, the Yankees decided to upgrade the closer position in the 1977 off-season. To this end they signed Pittsburgh Pirates' reliever Rich Gossage, who had been an All-Star the previous three years and had led the American League in saves while with the Chicago White Sox in 1975. Gossage was a power pitcher as opposed to Lyle's more slider-based approach and could throw his fastball much harder than Lyle could, at or near 100 MPH on a consistent basis. Although Lyle was not opposed to the Yankees' move, he later said that they should have gotten rid of him after they signed Gossage. Lyle knew the 26-year-old Gossage was a rising star who would eventually become the go-to reliever, and Lyle was not okay with a reduced role in the Yankees' bullpen.

During the 1978 season, working mostly in middle relief appearances, Lyle appeared in 59 games and recorded nine saves, most of which were early in the season. He also posted a 9–3 record out of the bullpen, but posted his second-highest earned run average. Lyle suffered a varicose vein flareup in his pelvic area. Yankees teammate Graig Nettles quipped that Lyle went "from Cy Young to sayonara."

During the course of the season, Lyle expressed a desire to leave the Yankees. One of Lyle's desired destinations was the Texas Rangers, and he believed that a deal would be done "before Christmas". On November 10, 1978, the Yankees traded him to the Rangers along with catcher Mike Heath, pitchers Larry McCall and Dave Rajsich, and minor league shortstop Domingo Ramos in exchange for outfielder Juan Beníquez, pitchers Mike Griffin, Paul Mirabella, and Dave Righetti, and minor league outfielder Greg Jemison. $400,000 in cash was paid to the Rangers.

== Later career ==
Lyle signed a contract with the Rangers shortly after he was acquired, with the intention of him finishing his playing career in Texas. However, Lyle was not the same pitcher he had been in his All-Star years and it showed. He split closer duties with Jim Kern his first year in Texas and managed only thirteen saves. Lyle also posted eight losses against five wins. He was nearly dealt along with Johnny Grubb from the Rangers to the Philadelphia Phillies for Tug McGraw, Bake McBride and Larry Christenson at the 1979 Winter Meetings in Toronto, but the proposed transaction was never executed because, although Lyle did not have a no-trade clause negotiated into the deal he had signed after being traded to the Rangers, the two sides had agreed to defer a total of $500,000 that was to be paid to him over ten years as his salary for becoming an analyst on the team's television broadcasts once Lyle retired and they could not strike an agreement regarding that.

In 1980, Lyle recorded only eight saves. Entering the season as one of two contenders to break Hoyt Wilhelm's career saves record, he was caught and passed by Rollie Fingers early in the year on Fingers' way to setting a new mark himself.

Lyle was dealt to the Phillies on September 13 in a transaction that was completed when Kevin Saucier was sent to the Rangers two months later on November 19. Since he was acquired after the deadline for postseason eligibility, he did not pitch for the Phillies during the National League Championship Series nor the 1980 World Series. For the first time in his career Lyle recorded an ERA above 4.00. In 1981 he saw more of the same, recording only two saves in 49 games with a 4.44 ERA and a 9–6 record.

His contract was purchased by the Chicago White Sox from the Phillies on August 21, 1982. He played his last game on September 27. He was released by the White Sox on October 12, 1982. Lyle finished his 16-year career with 238 saves, a 2.88 ERA, and a record of 99–76 in 899 games pitched — all in relief. In 1985, Fingers broke his American League record for career saves; and in 1991 Righetti surpassed Lyle's major-league record for career saves by a left-hander, though Lyle still holds the AL mark of 232.

== Post-playing years ==
In 1998, Lyle became the first manager of the Somerset Patriots, an independent baseball league team based in Bridgewater, New Jersey. He managed the team to Atlantic League pennants in 2001, 2003, 2005, 2008 and 2009, and was the Patriots' manager until November 27, 2012, when he became manager emeritus. Lyle's number 28 was retired by the Patriots on June 14, 2014.

== Clubhouse antics ==
A noted clubhouse prankster in his playing days, Lyle was known for sneaking into the locker room during games to sit naked on birthday cakes prepared for teammates, leaving the imprint of his posterior on the frosting. In his autobiography, Lyle noted that teammate Ron Swoboda turned the tables on him by defecating on a cake which was then delivered to Lyle; Lyle said the reason why he eventually stopped his cake sitting was because of the notoriety he gained from doing it, thinking that someone might try to "put a needle in the cake" to hurt him.

As a world-class practical joker, Lyle engaged in creative pranks like putting goldfish in the dugout water cooler and ordering pizzas to be delivered to the other team's bullpen. Once, he got revenge on Yogi Berra for using his toothpaste before games by injecting liniment into the tube; Lyle said that once the liniment came in contact with Berra's mouth it figuratively caused smoke to pour from his gums.

He loved giving "hotfoots", a time-honored baseball trick where a player will sneak up on another player or reporter while they are giving an interview in the dugout. The unsuspecting victim then has a match or two placed gently in the back or side of their shoe, with the head facing out. When the moment is right, the prankster lights the match head and slinks away to watch from a distance. As soon as the flame from the slowly burning head reaches the victim's shoe, it's hot enough to be felt. Lyle enjoyed the final result, usually a startled yelp in the middle of a serious conversation.

== Books ==
- Lyle, Sparky; Golenbock, Peter (1979). The Bronx Zoo. Crown Publishers. ISBN 0-517-53726-5.
- Lyle, Sparky; Fisher, David (1990). The Year I Owned the Yankees: A Baseball Fantasy. Bantam Books. ISBN 0-553-05750-2.

== See also ==
- List of Major League Baseball annual saves leaders
