= Mike Heath (baseball) =

American baseball player (born 1955)

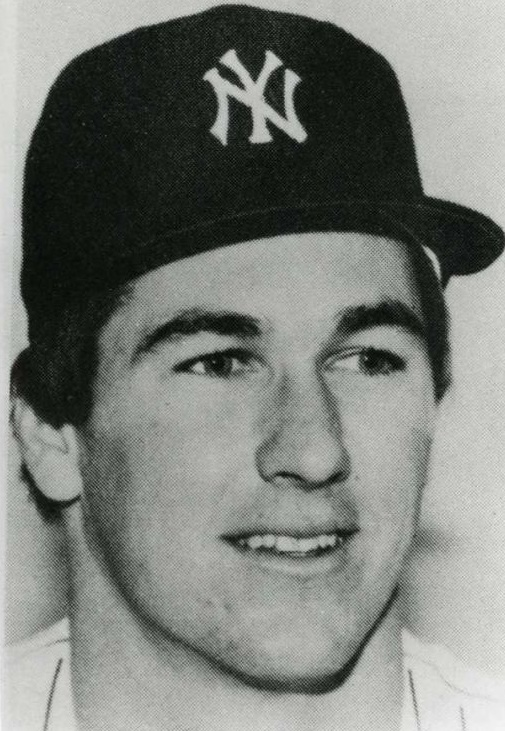
- Heath in 1978
- Catcher
- Born: February 5, 1955 (age 71); Tampa, Florida, U.S.
- Batted: Right Threw: Right

MLB debut
- June 3, 1978, for the New York Yankees

Last MLB appearance
- July 2, 1991, for the Atlanta Braves

MLB statistics
- Batting average: .252
- Home runs: 86
- Runs batted in: 469
- Stats at Baseball Reference

Teams
- New York Yankees (1978); Oakland Athletics (1979–1985); St. Louis Cardinals (1986); Detroit Tigers (1986–1990); Atlanta Braves (1991)

Career highlights and awards
- World Series champion (1978)

Michael Thomas Heath (born February 5, 1955) is an American former professional baseball catcher. He played 14 seasons in Major League Baseball (MLB) with the New York Yankees (1978), Oakland Athletics (1979–1985), St. Louis Cardinals (1986), Detroit Tigers (1986–1990), and Atlanta Braves (1991).

While Heath played most of his games as a catcher, he started his professional baseball career as a shortstop and played every position except pitcher during his major league career. He played 1,083 games at catcher, 142 games in right field, 79 games in left field, 39 games as a DH, 38 games at third base, four games each at first base and shortstop, and one game each at second base and center field.

== Career ==
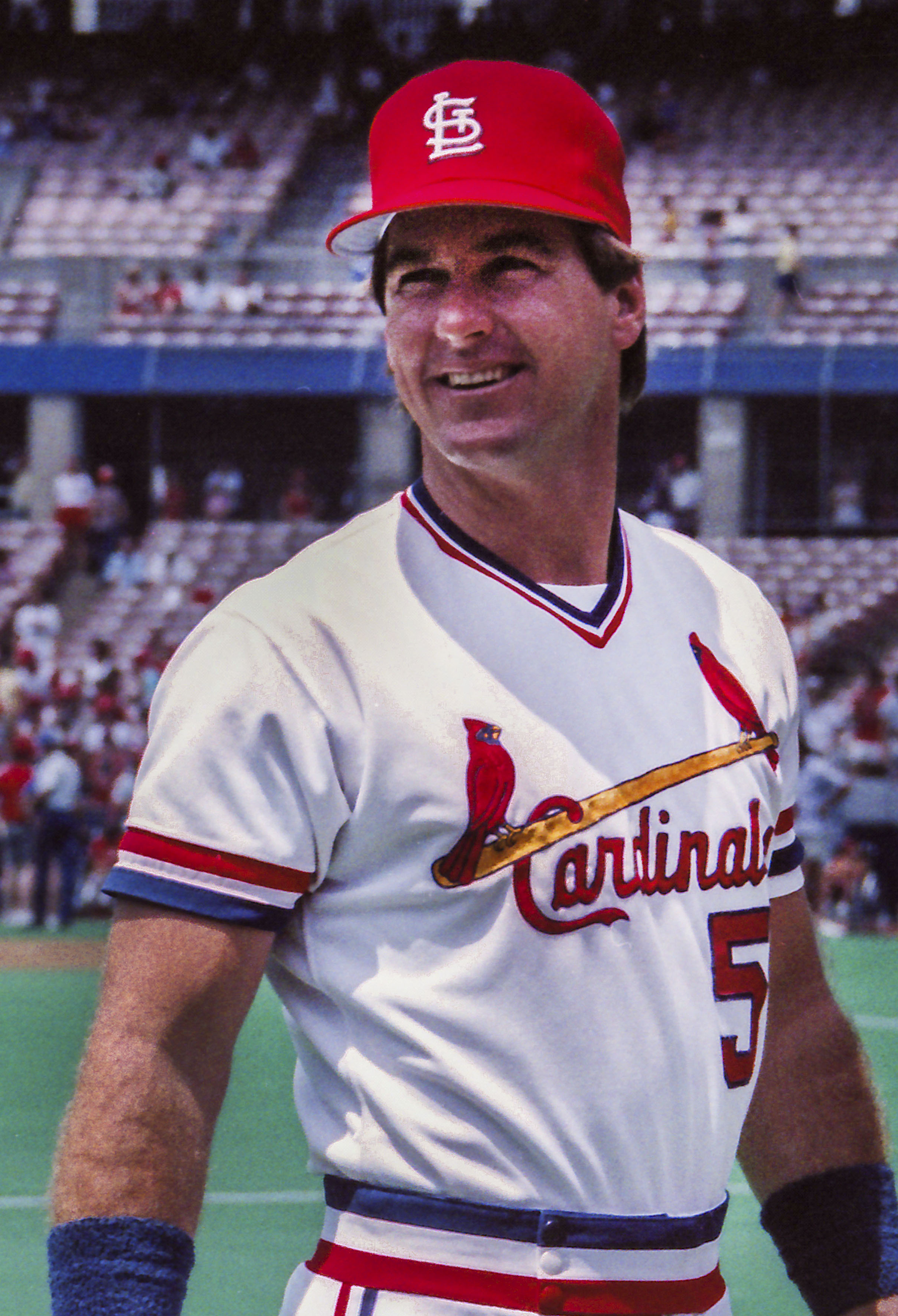
Heath during his one season with the St.Louis Cardinals, 1986.

Drafted by the New York Yankees in the second round of the 1973 Major League Baseball draft, Heath made his major league debut with the team on June 3, 1978, at the age of 23. He hit .228 in 33 games with the 1978 Yankees and appeared in one game of the 1978 World Series.

On November 10, 1978, the Yankees traded Heath, Sparky Lyle, Larry McCall, Dave Rajsich, Domingo Ramos, and cash to the Texas Rangers for Dave Righetti, Juan Beníquez, Mike Griffin, Paul Mirabella, and Greg Jemison. The following June, after never playing at the major league level for Texas, Heath was traded to the Oakland Athletics where he got substantial playing time in seven seasons with the Athletics. Heath hit .333 for the A's in the 1981 American League Championship Series.

While with the A's, Heath caught Mike Warren's no-hitter on September 29, 1983.

After a season in which he batted .250 with 13 home runs, Heath was traded along with Tim Conroy from the Athletics to the Cardinals for Joaquín Andújar during the Winter Meetings on December 10, 1985. The Cardinals were in need of a catcher after releasing Darrell Porter and having only a barely tested Tom Nieto on its depth chart.

Heath was known for his strong throwing arm. In 1989, playing with the Detroit Tigers, Heath led the AL's catchers with 66 assists and 10 double plays.

Heath singled in his last plate appearance, on July 2, 1991, against the Cincinnati Reds.

In 1325 games over 14 seasons, Heath posted a .252 batting average (1061-for-4212) with 462 runs, 173 doubles, 27 triples, 86 home runs, 469 RBI, 54 stolen bases and 278 bases on balls. He finished his career with an overall .981 fielding percentage. In nine postseason games, he batted .190 (4-for-21) with 2 runs, 1 home run and 2 RBI.
