= Larry McCall =

American baseball player (born 1952)

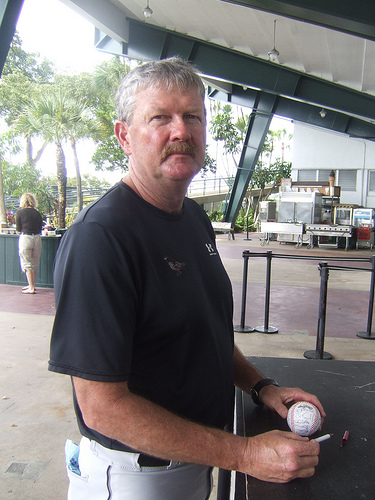
- McCall in 2009
- Pitcher
- Born: September 8, 1952 (age 73); Asheville, North Carolina, U.S.
- Batted: Left Threw: Right

MLB debut
- September 10, 1977, for the New York Yankees

Last MLB appearance
- September 27, 1979, for the Texas Rangers

MLB statistics
- Win–loss record: 2–2
- Earned run average: 5.04
- Strikeouts: 10
- Stats at Baseball Reference

Teams
- New York Yankees (1977–1978); Texas Rangers (1979)

Larry Stephen McCall (born September 8, 1952) is an American former Major League Baseball pitcher who played for the New York Yankees and the Texas Rangers. He bats left-handed and throws right-handed.

== Early life ==
McCall attended Enka High School in Candler, North Carolina. He played for the school's baseball team, helping lead them to the 1970 North Carolina 3A state title.

== Playing career ==
McCall was signed by the Baltimore Orioles on February 27, 1971, as an amateur free agent. On September 16, 1974, he was purchased by the California Angels, but was returned to the Orioles by the Angels on October 25 of the year. On April 10, 1976, he was released by the Orioles, and on the same day, signed with the New York Yankees as a free agent.

McCall made his Major League debut on September 10, 1977, with the Yankees against the Toronto Blue Jays at Yankee Stadium, with 20,296 people attending the game. McCall was called to replace Stan Thomas, and pitched the top of the seventh inning; the Yankees lost the game to the Blue Jays 19–4. On November 10, 1978, McCall was traded by the New York Yankees with Mike Heath, Sparky Lyle, Dave Rajsich, Domingo Ramos, and cash to the Texas Rangers for Dave Righetti, Juan Beníquez, Mike Griffin, Paul Mirabella, and minor leaguer Greg Jemison. He played his final Major League game on September 27, 1979. On January 4, 1980, McCall was traded by the Rangers with Mike Bucci (minors) and Gary Gray to the Cleveland Indians for David Clyde and Jim Norris.

== Coaching career ==
McCall served as the pitching coach with the Bluefield Orioles in 1990. He later coached the Class-A Kane County Cougars for two seasons. He was with the Frederick Keys for the 1993 season and spent three seasons there before going to the High Desert Mavericks in 1996. McCall was the pitching coach for the Double-A Bowie Baysox in 1997, and that off-season he went to Australia to serve as the pitching coach for the Perth Heat. After spending the four years with the Rochester Red Wings, he served as the pitching coach for the Gulf Coast League Orioles in 2002, and for the Delmarva Shorebirds in 2003.

In 2005, McCall was named the winner of the Cal Ripken Sr. Player Development Award. McCall was the bullpen coach for Baltimore during the second half of the 2006 season. His 21 years as a coach in the organization came to an end on September 24, 2010, when the Orioles declined to retain him.
