= Dave Righetti =

American baseball player and coach (born 1958)

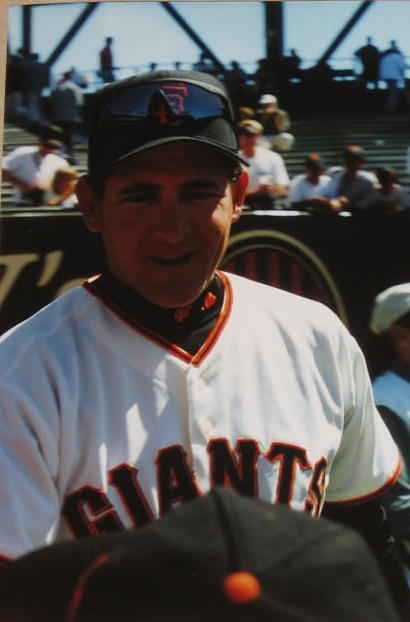
- Righetti with the San Francisco Giants
- Pitcher
- Born: November 28, 1958 (age 67); San Jose, California, U.S.
- Batted: Left Threw: Left

MLB debut
- September 16, 1979, for the New York Yankees

Last MLB appearance
- September 18, 1995, for the Chicago White Sox

MLB statistics
- Win–loss record: 82–79
- Earned run average: 3.46
- Strikeouts: 1,112
- Saves: 252
- Stats at Baseball Reference

Teams
- As player: New York Yankees (1979, 1981–1990); San Francisco Giants (1991–1993); Oakland Athletics (1994); Toronto Blue Jays (1994); Chicago White Sox (1995); As coach: San Francisco Giants (2000–2017)

Career highlights and awards
- 2× All-Star (1986, 1987); 3× World Series champion (2010, 2012, 2014); AL Rookie of the Year (1981); 2× AL Rolaids Relief Man Award (1986, 1987); AL saves leader (1986); Pitched a no-hitter on July 4, 1983

David Allan Righetti (born November 28, 1958), nicknamed "Rags", is an American professional baseball coach and former player. A left-handed pitcher, Righetti played in Major League Baseball from 1979 through 1995 for the New York Yankees, San Francisco Giants, Oakland Athletics, Toronto Blue Jays, and Chicago White Sox. He served as the pitching coach for the Giants from 2000 through 2017.

Righetti began his career as a starting pitcher, but the Yankees converted him into a relief pitcher, using him as their closer, in 1984. He won the American League (AL) Rookie of the Year Award in 1981. As a starter, he threw a no-hitter on July 4, 1983. As a closer, he was twice named the AL Rolaids Relief Man of the Year and pitched in two MLB All-Star Games. He was the first player in history to both pitch a no-hitter and lead the league in saves in his career. Dennis Eckersley later duplicated the feat, as did Derek Lowe.

== Early life ==
David Allan Righetti was born on November 28, 1958, in San Jose, California. His father, Leo, was a professional baseball player. His brother, Steve, is thirteen months older than Dave. Leo trained his sons to become baseball players. Dave and Steve starred for their Lincoln Glen Little League team, Letterman, with Dave playing in the outfield and Steve playing shortstop.

Righetti attended Pioneer High School. Paddy Cottrell, a scout for the Texas Rangers of Major League Baseball, noticed Righetti and suggested he become a pitcher due to his throwing motion. As a senior, he was named to the All-League team.

== College career ==
Righetti enrolled at San Jose City College, where he continued his development as a pitcher on the school's baseball team. He was named the junior college player of the year, beating out teammate Dave Stieb.

== Professional career ==
=== Draft and minor leagues ===
At Cottrell's urging, the Rangers selected Righetti on January 11, 1977, in the first round (10th overall pick) of the amateur draft. The Rangers selected Steve in the sixth round.Both Righetti brothers signed with the Rangers. Dave made his professional debut that year in minor league baseball with the Asheville Tourists of the Class A Western Carolinas League, where he pitched to an 11–3 win–loss record.

In 1978, Righetti pitched for the Tulsa Drillers of the Class AA Texas League. In a July game against the Midland RockHounds, Righetti recorded a league-record 21 strikeouts. Jerry Walker, a scout for the New York Yankees, was present in the stands. Yankees owner George Steinbrenner, while negotiating a trade with Rangers owner Brad Corbett that offseason, specifically waited until late in their negotiations to ask that Righetti be added to the trade. On November 10, 1978, the Yankees acquired Righetti, along with Juan Beníquez, Mike Griffin, Greg Jemison, and Paul Mirabella, while the Rangers acquired Sparky Lyle, Domingo Ramos, Mike Heath, Larry McCall, Dave Rajsich, and cash. The Yankees introduced Righetti as "the next Ron Guidry". Righetti was almost traded to the Minnesota Twins in January 1979; the Twins and Yankees were unable to complete a deal in which Righetti, Chris Chambliss, Juan Beníquez, and Dámaso García would have moved to Minnesota in exchange for Rod Carew.

=== New York Yankees (1979–1990) ===
Righetti made his major league debut with the Yankees on September 16, 1979, wearing uniform number 56. In this game against the Detroit Tigers he pitched five innings, striking out three and allowing three hits, six walks, and three earned runs. After Righetti made his second start, Yankees' manager Billy Martin declared that Righetti "will win 20 games next season". However, Righetti struggled with his control, and spent the 1980 season with the Columbus Clippers of the Class AAA International League, where he had a 6–10 win–loss record and a 4.63 ERA with 101 walks and 139 strikeouts in 142 innings.

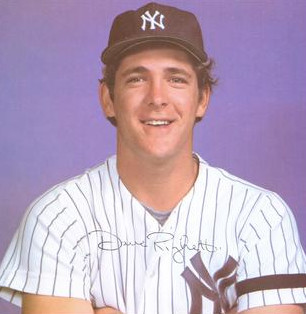
Righetti in 1981

Though Righetti pitched well in spring training in 1981, the Yankees did not have room for him on their roster, so he began the season with Columbus. After he pitched to a 5–0 record and 1.00 ERA with 50 strikeouts in 45 innings, the Yankees recalled Righetti from Columbus in May 1981. He was assigned uniform number 19. The Yankees reserved numbers ending in 9 for pitchers they viewed as having promise: Dick Tidrow wore 19 for the Yankees, while Catfish Hunter wore 29, Ron Davis wore 39, and Guidry wore 49. Righetti pitched strongly as a starter for the Yankees, posting an 8–4 win–loss record in 15 games started, with a 2.06 earned run average (ERA) and 89 strikeouts in 105 innings pitched during the 1981 season. Righetti won the American League's Rookie of the Year award, beating Rich Gedman and Bob Ojeda. Righetti defeated the Milwaukee Brewers twice during the 1981 American League Division Series. The Yankees reached the World Series that year; however, he was knocked out of game three of the 1981 World Series early, which was won by the Los Angeles Dodgers.

In 1982, Righetti pitched to an 8.53 ERA during spring training. Steinbrenner sought to demote Righetti to the minor leagues, but stated he "got outvoted then". Through June 1982, Righetti had pitched to a 5–5 win–loss record with a 4.23 ERA. Though his 77 strikeouts were fourth-best in the American League, his 62 walks were considered a problem. The Yankees demoted Righetti to the minor leagues, for what Steinbrenner termed a "2 1/2-week intensive brushing up". Sammy Ellis, Righetti's pitching coach with Columbus, said that Righetti had been rushing his pitching motion, which was likely due to anxiety. Working with Ellis, Righetti made four starts for the Clippers, recording 33 strikeouts in 26 innings, before he was recalled to New York. Righetti finished the 1982 season with 11 wins in 27 starts, with a 3.79 ERA and 162 strikeouts and 108 walks. His strikeouts were third-best in the AL, while his walks led the league.

On July 4, 1983, Righetti threw a no-hitter against the Boston Red Sox at Yankee Stadium. It was the first Yankee no-hitter since Don Larsen's perfect game in the 1956 World Series, and the first by a Yankee left-hander since 1917. Righetti recorded a swinging strikeout against Wade Boggs to end the game. Twenty-five years later, Righetti reminisced about the game:

My biggest worry, because I had a tendency to fall toward third base, was him (Boggs) tapping a ball between me and Mattingly and me trying to get to first base...I threw a lot of fastballs during the at bat, but the last slider I ended up throwing, he happened to miss it. Thank goodness.

In 1984 Righetti was moved to the Yankees' bullpen to replace Goose Gossage, who signed with the San Diego Padres in the offseason, as their closer. Despite the move being due to the Yankees having an excess of starters, many criticized the decision, arguing that Righetti was more valuable pitching as a starter, where he would accrue more innings.

Entering his first game as a relief pitcher with the bases loaded, Righetti did not allow an inherited runner to score, retiring the final seven batters of the game. He proved even more effective in relief, averaging 32 saves per season over the next seven years with the Yankees, and being named an All-Star in 1986 and 1987. On October 4, 1986, he saved both games of a doubleheader against the Boston Red Sox, finishing the season with 46 saves, and breaking the major league record shared by Dan Quisenberry and Bruce Sutter. The record would stand until Bobby Thigpen saved 57 games for the Chicago White Sox in 1990. Righetti retained the single-season record for left-handers until 1993, when Randy Myers saved 53 games for the Chicago Cubs; Righetti still owns the AL record for left-handers.

Righetti became a free agent after the 1987 season. Amid rumors that Righetti would sign a three-year contract worth $20 million with the Tokyo Giants of Nippon Professional Baseball, Righetti's agent acknowledged that the Giants did make Righetti an offer, but stated that the value was considerably less than what was reported, and stated that Righetti would continue to pitch in MLB. The contract offer was later estimated at $10 million. Righetti chose to re-sign with the Yankees, signing a three-year contract worth $4.5 million.

Righetti struggled with the Yankees early in the 1988 season, blowing four consecutive save opportunities, resulting in boos from the Yankee Stadium crowds. He then recorded five saves in consecutive opportunities.

Righetti became concerned with the direction the Yankees were taking, as they had traded away Rickey Henderson, Jack Clark, and Dave Winfield.

=== San Francisco Giants (1991–1993) ===
After the 1990 season, Righetti signed as a free agent with the San Francisco Giants, receiving a four-year contract worth $10 million. While with the Giants in 1991, he broke Lyle's major league record for left-handers of 238 career saves; Righetti's record stood until 1994, when John Franco surpassed Righetti's career total of 252.

Righetti saved 24 games in 1991. He lost the closer role during the 1992 season to Rod Beck. Righetti made a start on June 10, 1992, his first start since September 1983. He pitched in middle relief for the Giants in the 1993 season.

=== Oakland Athletics (1994) ===
Released by the Giants after the 1993 season, Righetti signed as a free agent with the Oakland Athletics. After beginning 1994 with the Athletics, he was released.

=== Toronto Blue Jays (1994) ===
Righetti signed as a free agent with the Toronto Blue Jays in May 1994. Righetti had a 0–1 win–loss record and 6.75 ERA for the Blue Jays.

After that season, Righetti was released by the Blue Jays.

=== Chicago White Sox (1995) ===
In 1995, Righetti signed as a free agent with the Chicago White Sox. On November 9, 1995, he was again granted free agency; but no team signed him. Righetti retired to end his 16-year career, finishing with 252 saves, a 3.46 ERA, and a record of 82–79 in 718 games.

== Coaching career ==
=== San Francisco Giants (2000–2017) ===
In 2000, Righetti became the pitching coach for the Giants. Righetti's pitchers helped the Giants win the 2002 National League pennant, although the Giants would lose the World Series in seven games to the Anaheim Angels.

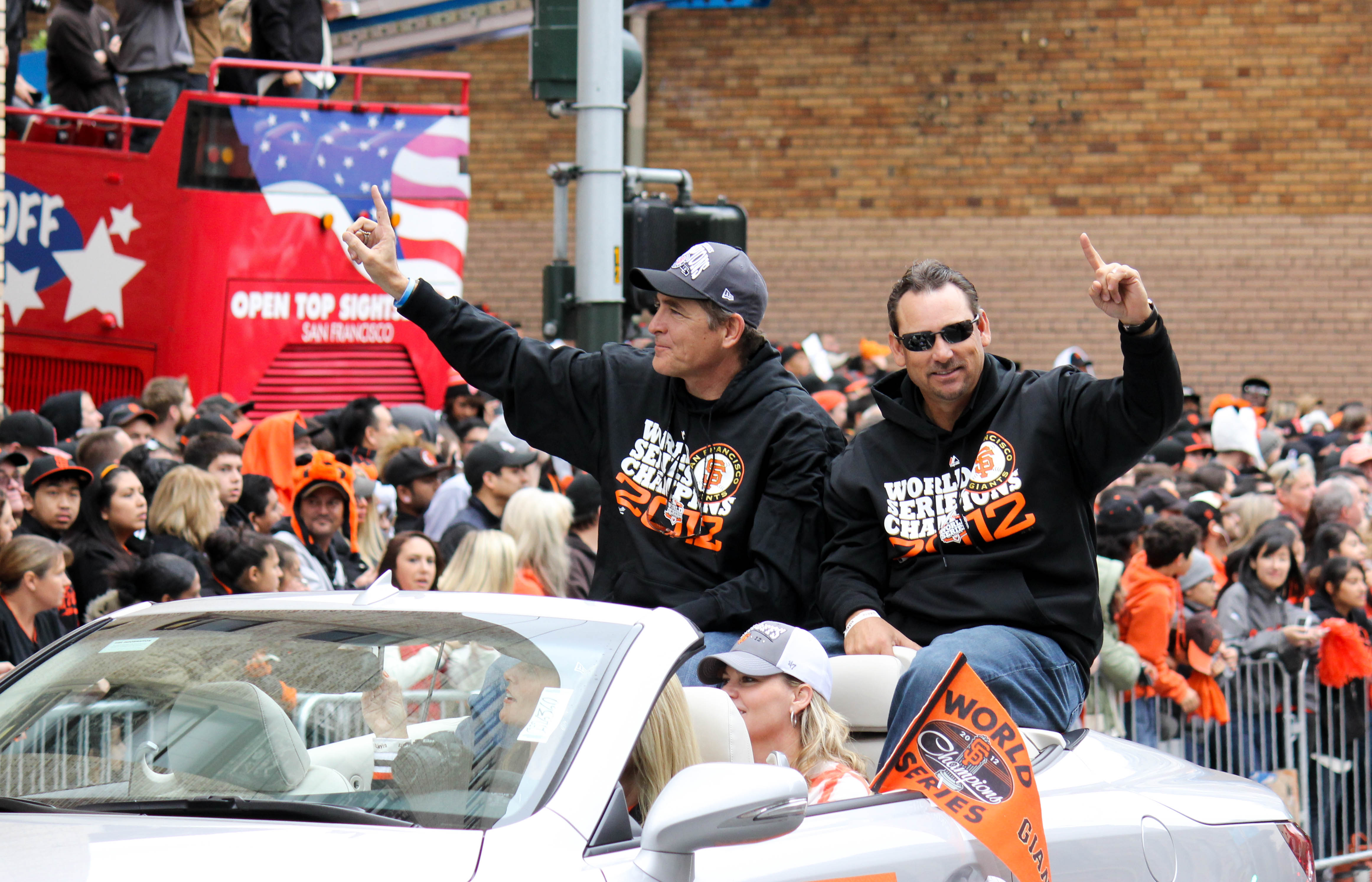
Righetti and Mark Gardner during the 2012 World Series parade

Despite uncertainty if he would return to the Giants for the 2007 season due to a managerial change, Righetti announced in early November 2007 that he would remain with the Giants in his present role. He was the pitching coach for the pitching staff that included Matt Cain, Madison Bumgarner, Tim Lincecum, Jonathan Sánchez, and Brian Wilson that won the 2010, 2012, and 2014 World Series. An analysis by Fangraphs showed that Righetti has an uncanny knack for teaching pitchers to avoid giving up home runs.

After the 2017 team tied for a Major League-worst 64–98 win–loss record, Righetti was removed from his role as pitching coach on October 21, 2017, and moved into a front-office role with the Giants. Righetti spent his entire 18 season coaching career as pitching coach of the San Francisco Giants, working under managers Dusty Baker, Felipe Alou, and Bruce Bochy. He served as the bullpen coach for the United States national baseball team in the 2023 World Baseball Classic.

== Personal life ==
Righetti and his wife had triplets (two daughters and one son), who were born in 1991; Righetti's sister-in-law served as a surrogate mother.

== See also ==
- List of Major League Baseball annual saves leaders
- List of Major League Baseball no-hitters

Awards and achievements
Preceded by Nolan Ryan	No-hitter pitcher July 4, 1983	Succeeded by Bob Forsch
