= Paul Mirabella =

American baseball player (born 1954)

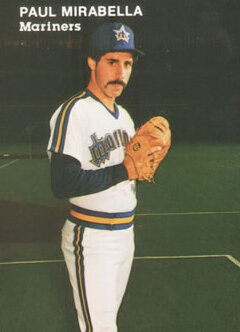
- Mirabella with the Seattle Mariners c. 1984
- Pitcher
- Born: March 20, 1954 (age 72); Belleville, New Jersey, U.S.
- Batted: Left Threw: Left

MLB debut
- July 28, 1978, for the Texas Rangers

Last MLB appearance
- September 27, 1990, for the Milwaukee Brewers

MLB statistics
- Win–loss record: 19–29
- Earned run average: 4.45
- Strikeouts: 258
- Stats at Baseball Reference

Teams
- Texas Rangers (1978); New York Yankees (1979); Toronto Blue Jays (1980–1981); Texas Rangers (1982); Baltimore Orioles (1983); Seattle Mariners (1984–1986); Milwaukee Brewers (1987–1990)

Paul Thomas Mirabella (born March 20, 1954) is an American former professional baseball pitcher. Mirabella, who threw left-handed, played all or parts of 13 seasons in Major League Baseball (MLB) for the Texas Rangers (1978 and 1982), New York Yankees (1979), Toronto Blue Jays (1980–81), Baltimore Orioles (1983), Seattle Mariners (1984–86) and Milwaukee Brewers (1987–90).

Mirabella attended Parsippany High School in Parsippany-Troy Hills, New Jersey, then Montclair State University.

The Rangers selected Mirabella in the first round of the January phase of the 1976 MLB draft. He led the Western Carolinas League with 136 strikeouts in 1976, then led the Texas League with 4 shutouts in 1977.

Mirabella made his MLB debut with Texas on July 28, 1978. That November, the Rangers traded him with Dave Righetti, Juan Beníquez, Mike Griffin, and Greg Jemison to the Yankees for Sparky Lyle, Mike Heath, Larry McCall, Dave Rajsich, Domingo Ramos, and cash. After one season in New York, the Yankees traded Mirabella with Chris Chambliss and Dámaso García to the Blue Jays for Rick Cerone, Tom Underwood, and Ted Wilborn in November 1979.

In 1980, Mirabella had a career-high 22 starts and threw the only three complete games and one shutout of his MLB career, but he had a 5–12 win–loss record. He never started more than two games in any future season. He pitched in eight games for Toronto in 1981. He was traded twice in the offseason, first in December to the Chicago Cubs for a player to be named later (PTBNL) (later identified as Dave Geisel), then back to the Rangers in March 1982 with a PTBNL for Bump Willis. In his second stint with Texas, he worked exclusively as a reliever for the first time, pitching in 40 games. The Rangers released him on March 26, 1983, a year after trading for him.

The following month, Mirabella signed with the Orioles. He pitched in three games for the Orioles, his fewest in any MLB season. The Philadelphia Phillies purchased his contract in August. Despite his limited action, he received a $500 World Series share from the Orioles after the season.

Mirabella played for the Mariners for the next three seasons, pitching in a career-high 52 games in 1984. He began the following season in the majors, but was demoted in May. He pitched in 18 MLB games combined in his final two seasons with the Mariners.

Mirabella played four seasons with Milwaukee to end his MLB career. He second season, in 1988, was one of his finest in the majors, with career bests with four saves and a 1.65 earned run average (ERA).

In the majors, Mirabella had a 19–29 record with a 4.45 ERA. He appeared in 298 games, including 33 as a starting pitcher. He pitched three complete games, including one shutout. As a relief pitcher, he finished 88 games, with 13 saves. Overall, he pitched 499 2/3 innings, facing 2,236 batters, striking out 258.

== Personal life ==
Mirabella and his wife have two children.

In high school, Mirabella played football and was the captain of his fencing team.
