= 1980 Major League Baseball strike =

Labor dispute in Major League Baseball history

The 1980 Major League Baseball strike occurred from April 1 to April 8. The strike caused the final eight days of spring training to be canceled, but it did not impact the regular season schedule.

== See also ==
- 1980 Major League Baseball season
