= Roger Slagle =

American baseball player (born 1953)

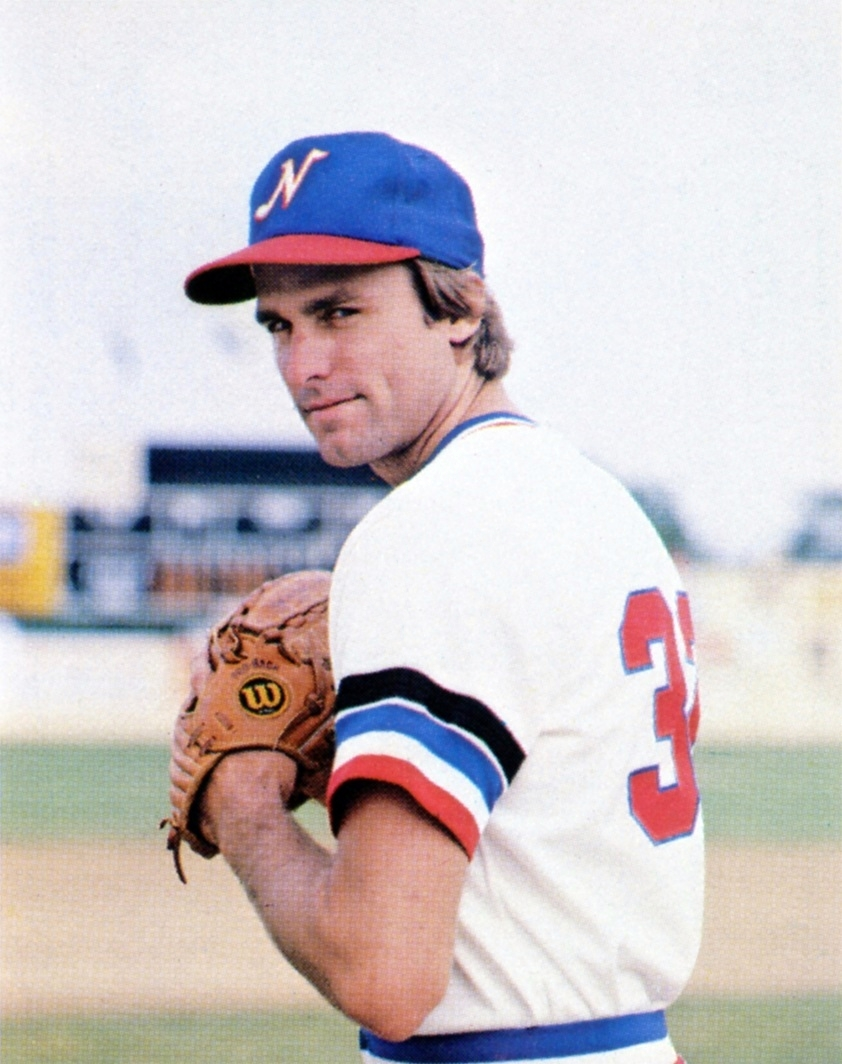
- Slagle with the Nashville Sounds in 1980
- Pitcher
- Born: November 4, 1953 (age 72); Wichita, Kansas, U.S.
- Batted: Right Threw: Right

MLB debut
- September 7, 1979, for the New York Yankees

Last MLB appearance
- September 7, 1979, for the New York Yankees

MLB statistics
- Win–loss record: 0–0
- Earned run average: 0.00
- Strikeouts: 2
- Stats at Baseball Reference

Teams
- New York Yankees (1979)

Roger Lee Slagle (born November 4, 1953) is an American former Major League Baseball (MLB) pitcher. He played a single MLB game for the New York Yankees. He was drafted by the Yankees in the first round (19th pick) of the secondary phase of the 1976 amateur draft.

Slagle grew up in Larned, Kansas and attended a high school too small to field a baseball team. He instead played PONY League Baseball and, while attending Hutchinson Community College, American Legion Baseball. After a year at Hutchinson, he transferred to Kansas where he played for the Kansas Jayhawks baseball team for two years. He sat out one season due to an arm injury.

Slagle pitched two perfect innings of relief for the Yankees in 1979, his only Major League appearance. He was removed from the roster shortly thereafter to make room for pitcher Rick Anderson.

Slagle played his last professional season with the Yankees' Double-A Nashville Sounds in 1982. His playing career ended after he tore his rotator cuff for a second time. As of 2016, he was teaching and coaching high school baseball in Frontenac, Kansas.
