= Greg Mahlberg =

American baseball player (born 1952)

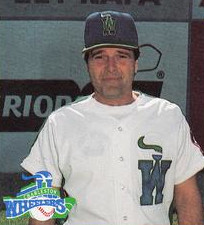
- Mahlberg in 1988
- Catcher
- Born: August 8, 1952; Milwaukee, Wisconsin, U.S.
- Died: April 23, 2024 (aged 71); Tucson, Arizona, U.S.
- Batted: Right Threw: Right

MLB debut
- September 24, 1978, for the Texas Rangers

Last MLB appearance
- September 30, 1979, for the Texas Rangers

MLB statistics
- Batting average: .111
- Home runs: 1
- Runs batted in: 1
- Stats at Baseball Reference

Teams
- Texas Rangers (1978–1979)

Gregory John Mahlberg (August 8, 1952 – April 23, 2024) was an American former professional baseball catcher, manager and coach. He threw and batted right-handed, stood 5 feet 10 inches (1.78 m) tall and weighed 185 pounds (84 kg).

Mahlberg attended Wisconsin Lutheran High School in Milwaukee and the University of Wisconsin–Madison. He was signed by the Texas Rangers as an undrafted free agent in 1973 and appeared briefly in Major League Baseball for the Rangers in 1978–79, collecting two hits in 18 at bats for an .111 career batting average. His lone Major League home run came off left-hander Floyd Bannister on September 3, 1979. As a minor leaguer, he batted .241 in 705 games spread over ten seasons (1973–82).

He began his managing career in the Seattle Mariners farm system in 1983, and spent 15 years as a minor league pilot, also working for the Chicago Cubs, Milwaukee Brewers and Tampa Bay Devil Rays. His career record was 904 victories, 1,050 defeats (.463). He managed in the Class A California League for eight seasons and at one point held the league record for victories by a manager with 526; Lenn Sakata broke the mark in 2007.

Mahlberg died on April 23, 2024 at the age of 71.
