= The Bronx Zoo (book) =

Book by Peter Golenbock

The Bronx Zoo: The Astonishing Inside Story of the 1978 World Champion New York Yankees
- First edition
- Author: Sparky Lyle, Peter Golenbock
- Language: English
- Subject: baseball
- Genre: autobiography
- Publisher: Crown Publishers
- Publication date: 1979
- Publication place: United States
- Media type: Print (Hardcover)
- Pages: 248 (first edition)
- ISBN: 0-517-53726-5

The Bronx Zoo: The Astonishing Inside Story of the 1978 World Champion New York Yankees is a nonfiction book written by former Major League Baseball pitcher Sparky Lyle and Peter Golenbock. A memoir of Lyle's tenure with the New York Yankees, the book documents the 1978 New York Yankees season, including the 1978 World Series and conflicts between players. The book was published by Crown Publishers in 1979.

The term "Bronx Zoo" became a nickname for the Yankees teams of the late 1970s through early 1980s.

== Background and synopsis ==
The New York Yankees won the 1977 World Series. Sparky Lyle, their closer, won the American League Cy Young Award that season, given to the league's best pitcher. However, Yankees owner George Steinbrenner acquired relief pitcher Goose Gossage from the Pittsburgh Pirates that offseason, giving him a larger salary than Lyle's. Though the Yankees wanted to have both Lyle and Gossage work late innings in games, it became apparent that the team would choose Gossage over Lyle in key situations. According to teammate Graig Nettles, Lyle went from "Cy Young to sayonara". Lyle demanded a trade and a larger salary, but received neither. After the 1978 season, the Yankees traded Lyle to the Texas Rangers.

Lyle dictated the book from March through November 1978 with a tape recorder. He received a $40,000 advance to write the book.

In the book, Lyle talks about his penchant for practical jokes. One of his favorite jokes was to sit, naked, on the birthday cake of a teammate.

== Reception ==
Sport printed excerpts from the book before its publication. The book spent 29 weeks on The New York Times bestseller list, peaking at number 2, and was the 13th best selling hardcover book of 1979. Dell Publishing purchased the book from Crown for the paperback version. Lyle stated during the 1979 MLB season that he regretted writing the book, as the publicity distracted him from pitching.

Lyle wrote a follow-up book in 1990, titled The Year I Owned the Yankees: A Baseball Fantasy, which parodied Steinbrenner's ownership of the Yankees.

== See also ==
- Ladies and Gentlemen, The Bronx Is Burning
- The Yankee Years
