= Darryl Jones (baseball) =

American baseball player (born 1951)

- Designated hitter
- Born: June 5, 1951 (age 75); Meadville, Pennsylvania, U.S.
- Batted: Right Threw: Right

MLB debut
- June 6, 1979, for the New York Yankees

Last MLB appearance
- July 11, 1979, for the New York Yankees

MLB statistics
- Batting average: .255
- Home runs: 0
- Runs batted in: 6
- Stats at Baseball Reference

Teams
- New York Yankees (1979)

Darryl Lee Jones (born June 5, 1951) is an American former Major League Baseball designated hitter. He was born on June 5, 1951, in Meadville, Pennsylvania. Jones is the brother of former Major League Baseball player Lynn Jones. Darryl attended college at Westminster College and was drafted by the New York Yankees in the 5th round of the 1972 draft. Jones played 18 games in his career, all of them with the Yankees in 1979. He had 12 career hits in 47 at bats.
