= Dennis Sherrill =

American baseball player (born 1956)

- Infielder
- Born: May 3, 1956 (age 70); Miami, Florida, U.S.
- Batted: Right Threw: Right

MLB debut
- September 4, 1978, for the New York Yankees

Last MLB appearance
- June 27, 1980, for the New York Yankees

MLB statistics
- Batting average: .200
- Home runs: 0
- Runs batted in: 0
- Stats at Baseball Reference

Teams
- New York Yankees (1978–1980)

Dennis Lee Sherrill (born May 3, 1956) is an American former Major League Baseball player for the New York Yankees. After being the Yankees' first round pick in the 1974 Major League Baseball draft, he played just five games in the major leagues, two in 1978 and three in 1980. Despite playing just five games, Sherrill managed to play four different positions: designated hitter, shortstop, second base, and third base (twice).

== Sources ==
- Career statistics from Baseball Reference · Baseball Reference (Minors) · Retrosheet · Baseball Almanac
