= Gary Gray (baseball) =

American baseball player (1952–2025)

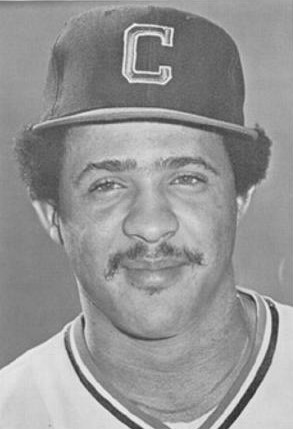
- First baseman
- Born: September 21, 1952; New Orleans, Louisiana, U.S.
- Died: August 29, 2025 (aged 72); LaPlace, Louisiana, U.S.
- Batted: Left Threw: Right

MLB debut
- June 23, 1977, for the Texas Rangers

Last MLB appearance
- September 27, 1982, for the Seattle Mariners

MLB statistics
- Batting average: .240
- Home runs: 24
- Runs batted in: 71
- Stats at Baseball Reference

Teams
- Texas Rangers (1977–1979); Cleveland Indians (1980); Seattle Mariners (1981–1982)

Gary George Gray (September 21, 1952 — August 29, 2025) was an American Major League Baseball (MLB) first baseman who played parts of six seasons from 1977 until 1982. During that time, he played for the Texas Rangers, Cleveland Indians, and Seattle Mariners.

== Career ==
Gray played college baseball at Southeastern Oklahoma State University, and was selected by the Rangers in the 18th round of the 1974 Major League Baseball draft. He spent 1974 with the Rangers' rookie squad, then played for the Anderson Rangers in 1975. With Anderson, Gray had a .302 batting average, 18 home runs, and 95 runs batted in in 135 games. In 1976, he played for the San Antonio Brewers, and had a .305 batting average, 19 home runs, and 109 runs batted in over 124 games. Gray spent the next three seasons primarily with the Tucson Toros, the Rangers' AAA affiliate, but saw bits of playing time with the major league Rangers. He made his debut on June 23, 1977, going 0-for-2 in his only game, and played in 17 and 16 games the following two seasons.

Before the 1980 season began, the Rangers traded Gray, Mike Bucci, and Larry McCall to the Cleveland Indians for David Clyde and Jim Norris. That year, he hit .148 in 28 games with Cleveland, and spent most of the year with the Tacoma Tigers. The following offseason, he was picked up by the Seattle Mariners in the Rule 5 Draft, as manager Rene Lachemann watched Gray play in the Pacific Coast League and wanted him in the starting lineup. He had his best season in 1981, splitting time at first base with starter Bruce Bochte and hitting 13 home runs in just 208 at bats. The next season, he hit .257 in a career high 80 games. After the season, his contract was sold to the California Angels. He played from 1983 to 1987 in the Mexican League, primarily with the Rieleros de Aguascalientes, before retiring from baseball.

Gray died August 29, 2025.
