= Rick Anderson (pitcher) =

American baseball player (1953-1989)

- Pitcher
- Born: December 25, 1953; Inglewood, California, U.S.
- Died: June 23, 1989 (aged 35); Wilmington, California, U.S.
- Batted: Right Threw: Right

MLB debut
- September 18, 1979, for the New York Yankees

Last MLB appearance
- October 5, 1980, for the Seattle Mariners

MLB statistics
- Win–loss record: 0–0
- Earned run average: 3.75
- Strikeouts: 7
- Stats at Baseball Reference

Teams
- New York Yankees (1979); Seattle Mariners (1980)

Richard Lee Anderson (December 25, 1953 – June 23, 1989) was an American Major League Baseball (MLB) pitcher. He pitched in one games for the New York Yankees in 1979 then five games for the Seattle Mariners in 1980.

Anderson attended Southern California Christian High School in Orange, California, then Los Angeles Valley College. The Yankees selected him in the first round of the January phase of the 1972 MLB draft. In 1979, Anderson was named the International League Pitcher of the Year with the Columbus Clippers. He made his major league debut with the Yankees on September 18, 1979, which was the only game pitched for the Yankees. After the season, the Yankees traded him with Jim Beattie, Juan Beníquez, and Jerry Narron to the Mariners for Ruppert Jones and Jim Lewis.

Anderson was a September call-up again in 1980, pitching in five games in his second and final MLB season. Anderson was on Seattle's 1981 Opening Day roster in the disabled list, then was sent down to the minors before playing in a game. After developing arm problems during the season, Anderson was released, ending his professional career.

Anderson died from heart failure brought on by atherosclerosis on June 23, 1989. When his body was discovered in his Wilmington, California home, he was holding a letter from a fan. During his playing days, he was listed at 6 feet 2 inches (1.88 m) tall and 210 pounds (95 kg). At the time of his death, he weighed more than 400 pounds (180 kg).
