= Bruce Robinson (baseball) =

American baseball player (born 1954)

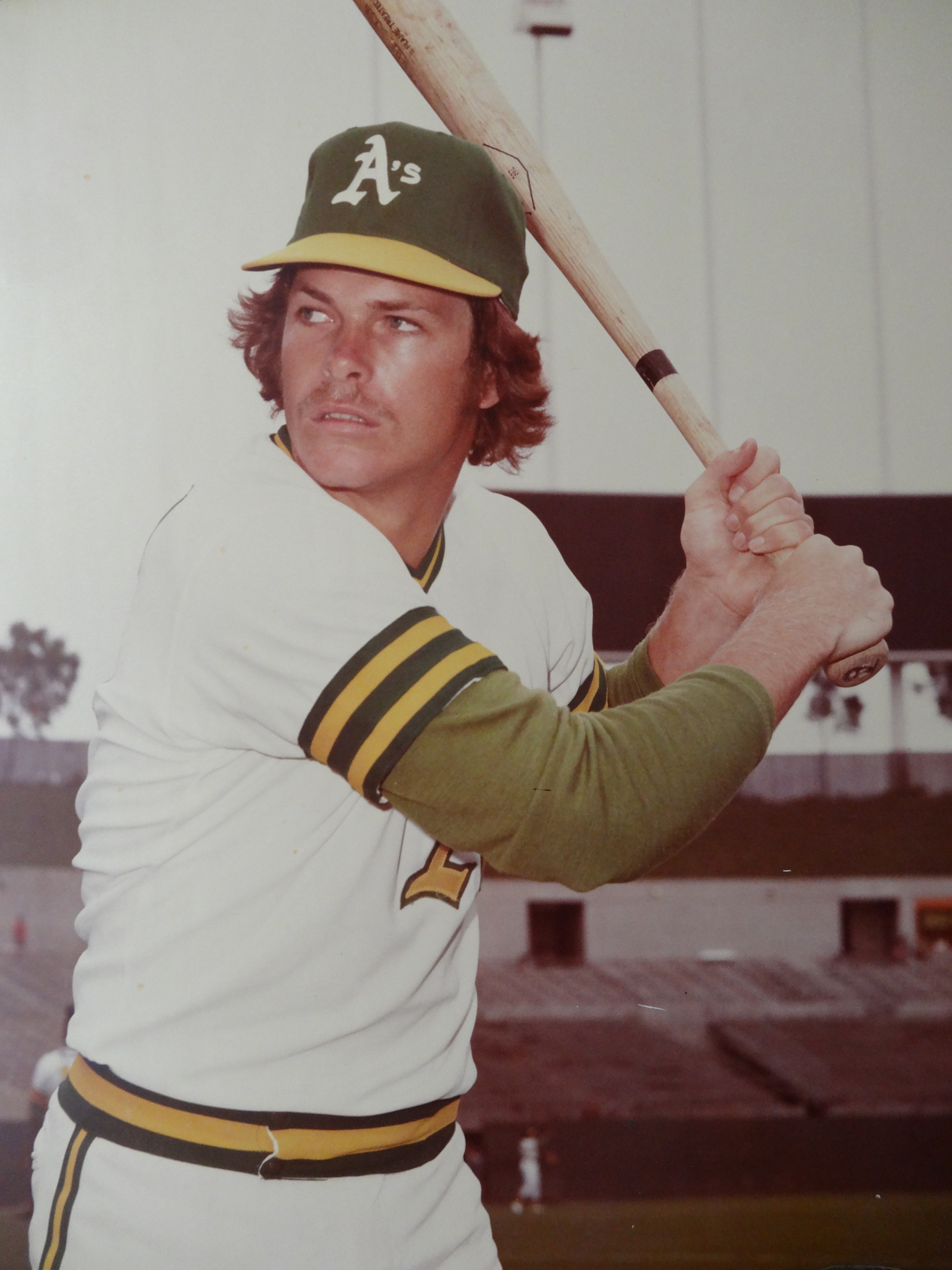
- Catcher
- Born: April 16, 1954 (age 72); La Jolla, California, U.S.
- Batted: Right Threw: Right

MLB debut
- August 19, 1978, for the Oakland Athletics

Last MLB appearance
- October 4, 1980, for the New York Yankees

MLB statistics
- Batting average: .228
- Home runs: 0
- Runs batted in: 10
- Stats at Baseball Reference

Teams
- Oakland Athletics (1978); New York Yankees (1979–1981)

Bruce Philip Robinson (born April 16, 1954) is an American former professional baseball catcher. He played parts of three seasons from 1978 until 1980 and was on the New York Yankees disabled list during the 1981 and 1982 seasons.

A first-round pick by the Oakland Athletics in the 1975 Major League Baseball draft, Robinson's career was derailed by an automobile accident while playing for the New York Yankees in 1980. He never returned to the majors, though he continued to play in the minor leagues in 1983, with the Pittsburgh Pirates AAA affiliate in Hawaii and in 1984 with the A's in Tacoma and Modesto. During that time, Robinson was a player-coach for the Modesto A's in 1984, where he worked with future stars Mark McGwire and Jose Canseco.

== Early years ==
Bruce Robinson was born in La Jolla, California, a beach community within the city of San Diego. After graduating from La Jolla High School in 1972, Bruce was chosen in the fourth round by the Chicago White Sox in the 1972 Major League Baseball draft, but elected to turn down their offer to attend Stanford University on a full baseball scholarship. Robinson received All-American recognition during both summer and college seasons at Stanford, breaking the university's single-season home run record in 1975. To this day, Robinson hit more home runs with a wooden bat in a single season than any other Stanford player.

After finishing the school year at Stanford, Robinson joined the top summer collegiate program in the nation, the Alaska Goldpanners of Fairbanks. There he played with dozens of players who went on to stardom in the Major Leagues, helping the Goldpanners win three consecutive national championships at the National Baseball Congress (NBC) Tournament in Wichita, Kansas. Robinson's 1974 squad is widely acclaimed as the best amateur team ever assembled.

== Professional baseball career ==
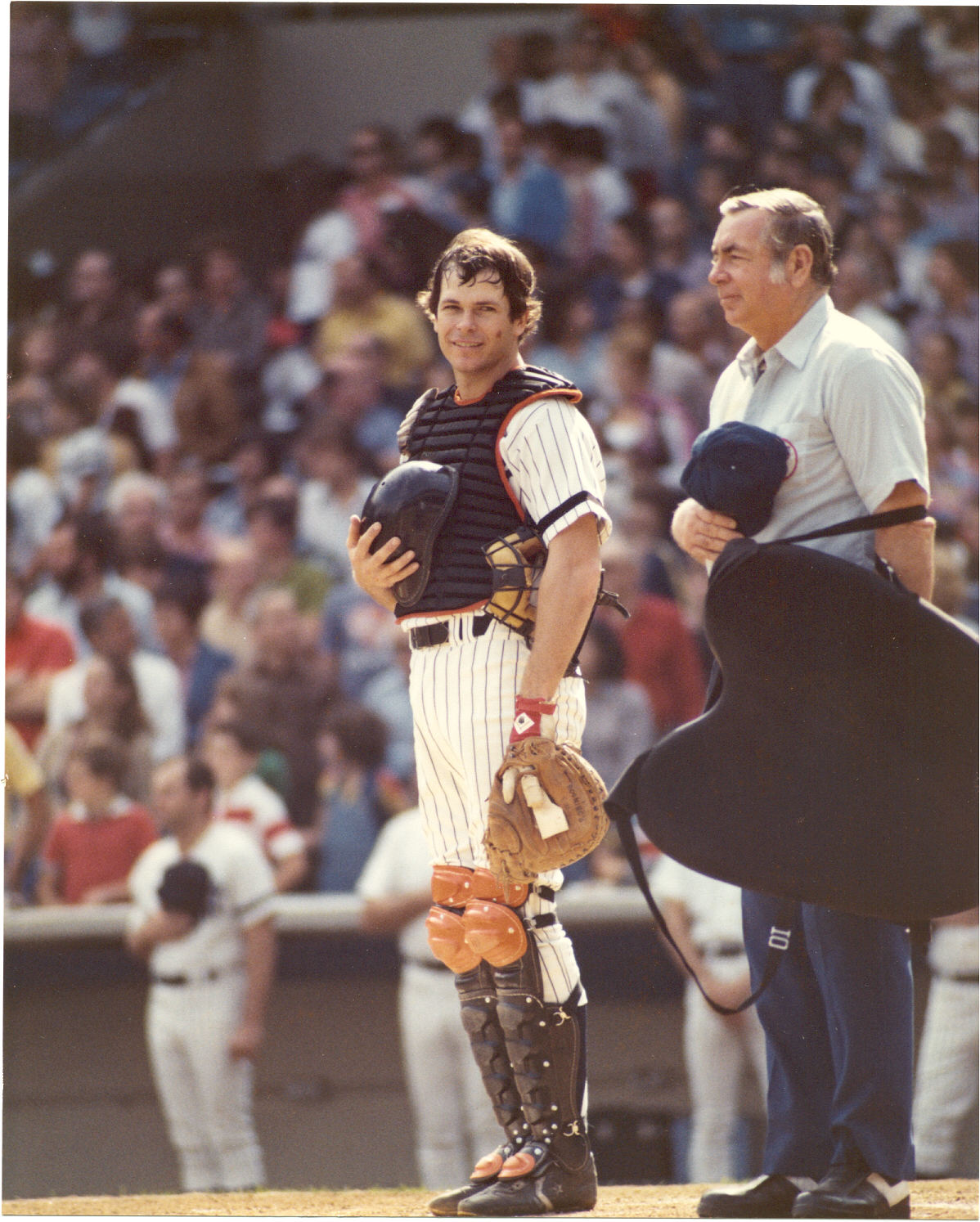
Bruce Robinson at Yankee Stadium

A first-round pick in the 1975 Major League Baseball draft (21st choice overall), Robinson got most of his major league at-bats with the 1978 Oakland Athletics. After batting .299 with 10 home runs and 73 RBI in 102 games with the Vancouver Canadians in 1978, he received a mid-August call-up to the Major League club and hit .250 in 88 plate appearances over the final 28 games of the season.

== Personal life ==
Robinson is also the father of Scott Robinson, an ambidextrous first baseman and catcher who played in the Houston Astros and Seattle Mariners organizations, was league MVP with the Macon Music, and spent two years as a player-coach with the River City Rascals.
