= Goose Gossage =

American baseball player (born 1951)

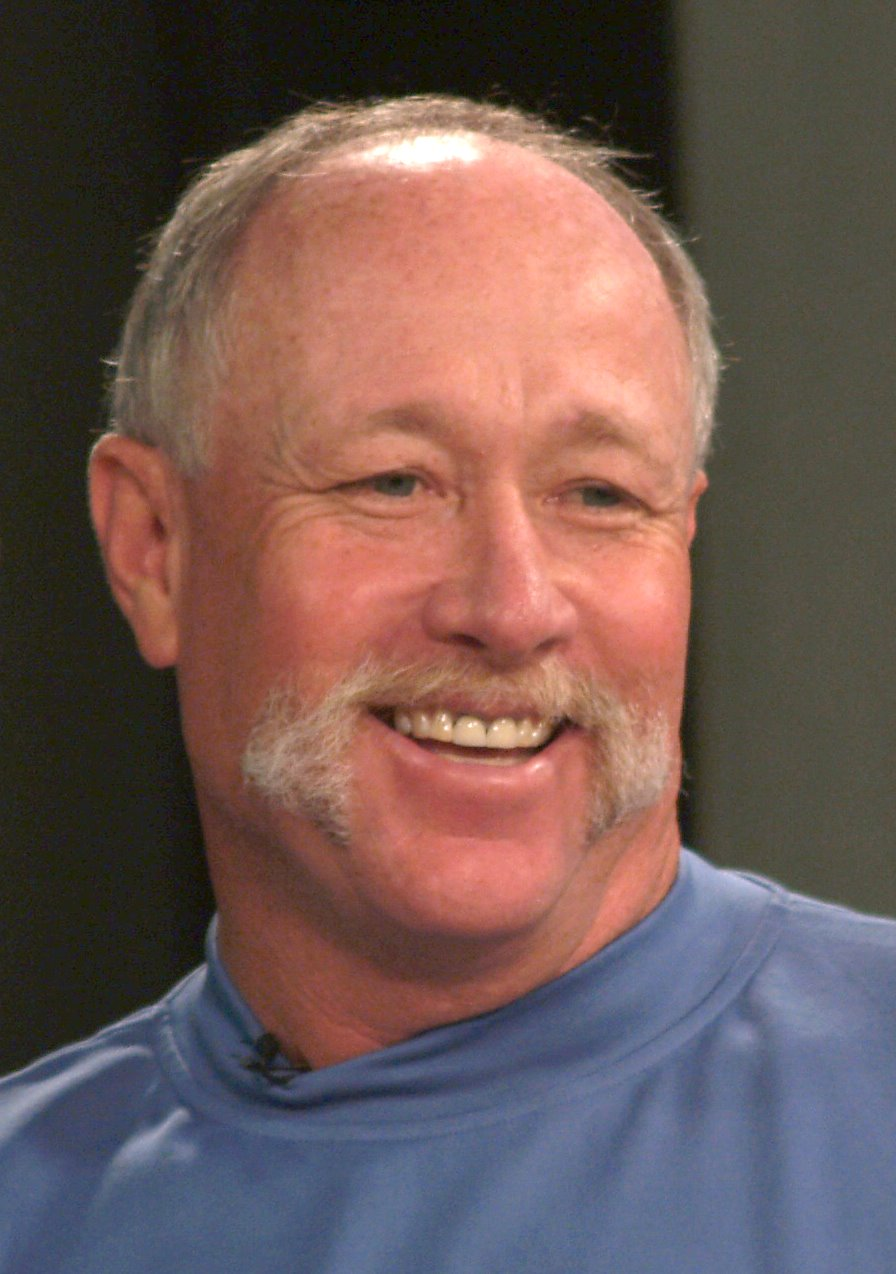
- Gossage in 2007
- Pitcher
- Born: July 5, 1951 (age 75); Colorado Springs, Colorado, U.S.
- Batted: Right Threw: Right

Professional debut
- MLB: April 16, 1972, for the Chicago White Sox
- NPB: July 4, 1990, for the Fukuoka Daiei Hawks

Last appearance
- NPB: October 10, 1990, for the Fukuoka Daiei Hawks
- MLB: August 8, 1994, for the Seattle Mariners

MLB statistics
- Win–loss record: 124–107
- Earned run average: 3.01
- Strikeouts: 1,502
- Saves: 310

NPB statistics
- Win–loss record: 2–3
- Earned run average: 4.40
- Strikeouts: 40
- Saves: 8
- Stats at Baseball Reference

Teams
- Chicago White Sox (1972–1976); Pittsburgh Pirates (1977); New York Yankees (1978–1983); San Diego Padres (1984–1987); Chicago Cubs (1988); San Francisco Giants (1989); New York Yankees (1989); Fukuoka Daiei Hawks (1990); Texas Rangers (1991); Oakland Athletics (1992–1993); Seattle Mariners (1994)

Career highlights and awards
- 9× All-Star (1975–1978, 1980–1982, 1984, 1985); World Series champion (1978); AL Rolaids Relief Man Award (1978); 3× AL saves leader (1975, 1978, 1980); Monument Park honoree

Member of the National

Baseball Hall of Fame
- Induction: 2008
- Vote: 85.8% (ninth ballot)

Richard Michael "Goose" Gossage (born July 5, 1951) is an American former professional baseball pitcher who played 22 seasons in Major League Baseball (MLB) between 1972 and 1994. He pitched for nine different teams, spending his best years with the New York Yankees and San Diego Padres.

In the late 1970s and early 1980s, Gossage was one of the earliest manifestations of the modern closer, with a bold mustache and a gruff demeanor to go along with his overpowering 100 mph fastball. He led the American League (AL) in saves three times and was runner-up twice; by the end of the 1987 season he ranked second in major-league career saves, trailing only Rollie Fingers, although by the end of his career his total of 310 had slipped to fourth all time. When he retired he also ranked third in major-league career games pitched (1,002), and he remains third in wins in relief (115) and innings pitched in relief (1,556 2/3); his 1,502 strikeouts place him behind only Hoyt Wilhelm among pitchers who pitched primarily in relief. He also is the career leader in blown saves (112). From 1977 through 1983 he never recorded an earned run average over 2.62, including a mark of 0.77 in 1981, and in 1980 he finished third in AL voting for both the MVP Award and Cy Young Award as the Yankees won a division title.

Respected for his impact in crucial games, Gossage recorded the final out to clinch a division, league, or World Series title seven times. His eight All-Star selections as a reliever were a record until Mariano Rivera passed him in 2008; he was also selected once as a starting pitcher. In 2008, Gossage was inducted into the Baseball Hall of Fame; he holds the record with Satchel Paige and Hoyt Wilhelm for the most franchises played for (9) by a Hall-of-Fame pitcher. Gossage now works in broadcasting.

== Early life ==
Richard Michael "Goose" Gossage was born on July 5, 1951, in Colorado Springs, Colorado, and he grew up near N. Cascade Avenue. He graduated in 1970 from Wasson High School, where he played on the baseball and basketball teams and is included in the school's athletic "Wall of Fame". His wife Corna Gossage also graduated from Wasson High.

== Professional career ==
=== Chicago White Sox (1972–1976) ===
Gossage was selected by the Chicago White Sox in the ninth round of the 1970 Major League Baseball draft and made his major league debut on April 16, 1972. During his first three major league seasons, he recorded a 4.93 earned run average (ERA). He then had a breakout season in 1975, leading the American League (AL) in saves (26) and outs per relief appearance (6.9). According to wins above replacement (WAR), Gossage's 1975 season is the most valuable by a relief pitcher in MLB history, with 8.2 WAR, surpassing John Hiller's record of 7.9 set just two years earlier with the Detroit Tigers. The White Sox converted Gossage to a starting pitcher in 1976; although he made his only All-Star Game as a starting pitcher, he failed to replicate his success from 1975, finishing with a 9–17 record.

=== Pittsburgh Pirates (1977) ===
After the 1976 season, the White Sox traded Gossage and Terry Forster to the Pittsburgh Pirates for Silvio Martinez and Richie Zisk. With the Pirates, Gossage returned to relief pitching and had another spectacular season, recording 26 saves, a 1.62 ERA and a career-high 151 strikeouts.

=== New York Yankees (1978–1983) ===
Gossage became a free agent after the 1977 season, and signed with the New York Yankees for $3.6 million over six years.

Gossage again led the AL in saves in 1978 (27) and 1980 (33). On October 2, 1978, he earned the save in the Yankees' one-game playoff against the Boston Red Sox for the AL East title, entering with one out in the seventh inning and a 4–2 lead following Bucky Dent's home run; although he allowed two runs in the eighth inning, he held on to preserve the 5–4 victory, getting Carl Yastrzemski to pop up to third baseman Graig Nettles with two out and two men on base in the ninth inning to clinch the division championship. He was also on the mound five days later when the Yankees clinched the pennant in the ALCS against the Kansas City Royals, entering Game 4 in the ninth inning with a 2–1 lead and a runner on second base; he earned the save by striking out Clint Hurdle and retiring Darrell Porter and Pete LaCock on fly balls. He was on the mound ten days later when they captured the World Series title against the Los Angeles Dodgers for their second consecutive championship, coming on with no one out in the eighth inning of Game 6; he retired Ron Cey on a popup to catcher Thurman Munson to clinch the win.

On April 19, 1979, following a Yankee loss to the Baltimore Orioles, Reggie Jackson started kidding Cliff Johnson about his inability to hit Gossage. While Johnson was showering, Gossage insisted to Jackson that he struck out Johnson all the time when he used to face him. “He either homers or strikes out”, Gossage said. When Jackson relayed this information to Johnson upon his return to the locker room, a fight started between him and Gossage. Gossage tore ligaments in his right thumb and missed three months of the season which cost the Yankees a chance to win their third consecutive World Series title. Yankees owner George Steinbrenner fined both Johnson and Gossage. Teammate Tommy John called it "a demoralizing blow to the team." Johnson was traded to Cleveland two months after the brawl. Ron Guidry, the reigning Cy Young Award winner, volunteered to go to the bullpen to replace him. In the first game of a doubleheader on October 4, 1980, Gossage pitched the last two innings of a 5–2 win over the Detroit Tigers, earning his career-high 33rd save as New York clinched another division title. On October 10, George Brett of the Royals hit a tide-turning three-run homer off Gossage into Yankee Stadium's right-field upper deck to lead the Royals to a three-game sweep in the AL Championship Series, after the Yankees had defeated the Royals in three consecutive ALCS from 1976 to 1978. Almost three years later during the regular season, Brett got to Gossage again in the Bronx, blasting a go-ahead two-run home run in the top of the ninth in a game memorialized as the "Pine Tar Game".

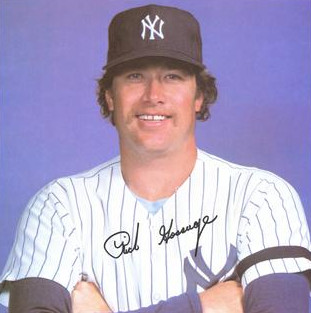
Gossage as a member of the Yankees in 1981

Gossage recorded saves in all three Yankee victories in the 1981 AL Division Series against the Milwaukee Brewers, not allowing a run in 6 2/3 innings, and he was again the final pitcher when they clinched the 1981 pennant against the Oakland Athletics. In 1983, his last season with the Yankees, Gossage broke Sparky Lyle's club record of 141 career saves; Dave Righetti passed his final total of 150 in 1988. Gossage holds the Yankees' career record for ERA (2.14) and hits per nine innings (6.59) among pitchers with at least 500 innings for the team.

In eight of his first ten seasons as a closer, Gossage's ERA was less than 2.27. Over his career, right-handed hitters hit .211 against him.

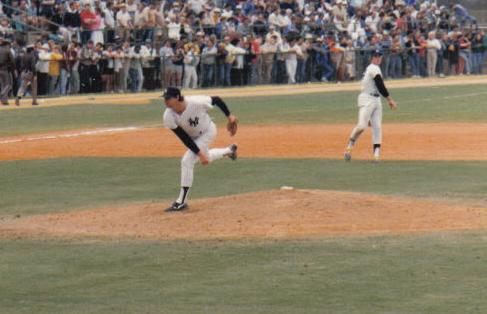
Gossage during 1983 spring training

Gossage became upset with Yankees' owner George Steinbrenner for meddling with the team. In 1982, he called Steinbrenner "the fat man upstairs", and disapproved of the way Yankees' manager Billy Martin used him. Gossage became a free agent after the 1983 season, and insisted that he would not re-sign with New York.

=== San Diego Padres (1984–1987) ===
Gossage in 1984 photo

Gossage signed with the San Diego Padres. In 1984, Gossage clinched another title, earning the save in Game 5 of the NL Championship Series and sending the Padres to their first World Series; after San Diego had scored four runs in the seventh inning to take a 6–3 lead against the Chicago Cubs, Gossage pitched the final two innings, getting Jody Davis to hit into a force play for the final out. During Game 5 of the 1984 World Series versus the Detroit Tigers, after receiving signs from the coaches on the Padres bench and a mound visit by manager Dick Williams, Gossage refused to intentionally walk right fielder Kirk Gibson with two runners on and first base open. On the second pitch, Gossage and the Padres would regret that decision as Gibson homered to deep right field, clinching a World Series win for the Tigers. On August 17, 1986, Gossage struck out Pete Rose in what proved to be Rose's final Major League at bat.

=== Chicago Cubs (1988) ===
Gossage was dealt along with Ray Hayward from the Padres to the Cubs for Keith Moreland and Mike Brumley on February 12, 1988. On August 6, 1988, while with the Cubs, Gossage became the second pitcher to record 300 career saves in a 7–4 victory over the Philadelphia Phillies, coming into the game with two out in the ninth and two men on base and retiring Phil Bradley on a popup to second baseman Ryne Sandberg. He was released by the Cubs in March 1989.

=== San Francisco Giants (1989) ===
Gossage signed with the San Francisco Giants in April.

=== New York Yankees (1989) ===
The Yankees selected Gossage off of waivers on August 10. He pitched in 11 games in his second stint with the franchise, going 1-0 with a 3.77 ERA and recording one save before being granted free agency on November 13.

=== Fukuoka Daiei Hawks (1990) ===
Gossage pitched for the Fukuoka Daiei Hawks of Nippon Professional Baseball in 1990.

=== Texas Rangers (1991) ===
Gossage signed with the Texas Rangers for the 1991 season. On July 23 of that year, he recorded his 308th career save in what also happened to be Nolan Ryan's 308th career win, the only save he would pick up with Texas. In 44 games, Gossage went 4-2 with a 3.57 ERA.

=== Oakland Athletics (1992–1993) ===
Gossage signed one-year contracts to pitch for the Oakland Athletics in 1992 and 1993.

=== Seattle Mariners (1994) ===
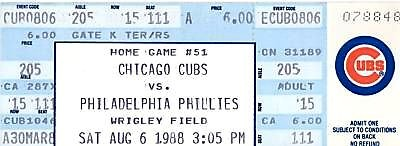
A ticket from the game where Gossage earned his 300th save.

Gossage signed with the Seattle Mariners for the 1994 season. On August 4, 1994, Gossage became the third pitcher in major league history to appear in 1,000 games. Gossage entered a game against the California Angels with two out in the seventh inning and runners on second and third base, trailing 2–1; he picked up the win when the Mariners scored three times in the eighth for a 4–2 victory. In his final major league appearance on August 8, he earned a save of three innings—his first in over 15 months—in the Mariners' 14–4 win over the Rangers, retiring all nine batters he faced; José Canseco flied out to left field to end the game.

Gossage had a record 112 career blown saves. ESPN.com noted that blown saves are "non-qualitative", pointing out that the two career leaders—Gossage and Rollie Fingers (109)—were both inducted into the Baseball Hall of Fame. Fran Zimniuch in Fireman: The Evolution of the Closer in Baseball wrote, "But you have to be a great relief pitcher to blow that many saves. Clearly, [Gossage] saved many, many more than he did not save." More than half of Gossage's blown saves came in tough situations, with the tying run on base when the pitcher entered. In nearly half of those blown tough saves, he entered the game in the sixth or seventh inning. Multiple-inning outings provide more chances for a reliever to blow a save, as he needs not only to get out of the initial situation but also to pitch additional innings in which to possibly lose the lead.

== Pioneer of the closer role ==
The New York Yankees of the late 1970s and early 1980s arguably pioneered the set-up/closer configuration, which was a standard baseball practice until the 2010s. The most effective pairing was Ron Davis and Gossage, with Davis typically entering the game in the 7th or 8th innings and Gossage finishing up. During one stretch with that pairing, the Yankees won 77 of 79 games in which they led after six innings.

Gossage and top relievers of his era were known as firemen, relievers who entered the game when a lead was in jeopardy—usually with men on base—and regardless of the inning and often pitching two or three innings while finishing the game. Gossage had 17 games where he recorded at least 10 outs in his first season as a closer, including three games where he went seven innings. He pitched over 130 innings as a reliever in three different seasons. He had more saves of at least two innings than saves where he pitched one inning or less. The ace reliever's role evolved into that of a closer, whose use was reserved for games where the team had a lead of three runs or less in the ninth inning. Mariano Rivera, considered the greatest closer of all time, earned only one save of seven-plus outs in his career, while Gossage logged 53. "Don't tell me [Rivera's] the best relief pitcher of all-time until he can do the same job I did. He may be the best modern closer, but you have to compare apples to apples. Do what we did," said Gossage.

During his career, Gossage pitched in 1,002 games and finished 681 of them, earning 310 saves. Per nine innings pitched, he averaged 7.45 hits allowed and 7.47 strikeouts. He also made nine All-Star appearances and pitched in three World Series.

== Pitching style ==
Gossage was one of the few pitchers who employed basically just one pitch, a rising 100 mph fastball. Occasionally he would throw a slurve or a changeup. Despite his reputation as a pitcher who threw high and tight to brush batters back, Gossage stated that he intentionally threw at only three hitters in his career: Ron Gant, Andrés Galarraga, and Al Bumbry.

== Nickname ==
The nickname "Goose" came about when a friend did not like Gossage's nickname "Goss", and noted he looked like a goose when he extended his neck to see the signs given by the catcher. Although Gossage is otherwise generally referred to as "Rich" in popular media, a youth sports complex in his hometown of Colorado Springs named after him bears the name "Rick", displaying "Rick 'Goose' Gossage Youth Sports Complex".

== Retirement ==
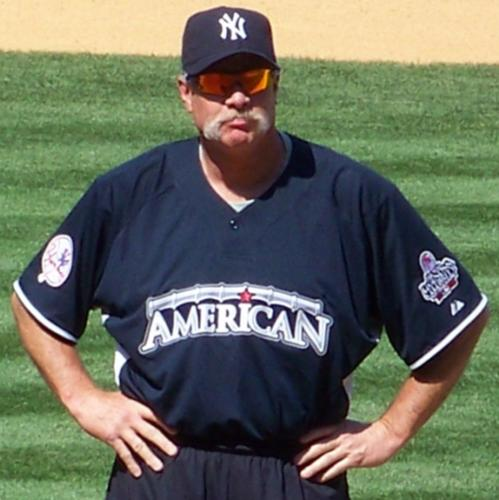
Gossage at the All-Star Legends and Celebrity Softball Game during the 2008 All-Star break.

Gossage lives in his home town, Colorado Springs, Colorado, and is active in the community promoting and sponsoring youth sports. In 1995, the city of Colorado Springs dedicated the Rick "Goose" Gossage Youth Sports Complex, which features five fields for youth baseball and softball competition. He also owned hamburger restaurants in Greeley and Parker, Colorado, called Burgers N Sports.

He has written an autobiography, released in 2000, titled The Goose Is Loose (Ballantine: New York).

His son, Todd, is a professional baseball player who has played for the Sussex Skyhawks, Newark Bears, and Rockland Boulders of the Can-Am League. His cousin's grandson, Aaron Gossage, is a professional disc golf player who is currently signed to a contract with the disc manufacturer MVP. He has won over 20 Mixed Professional Open (MPO) tournaments, amassing career earnings of $231,736 (as of October 2026).

Gossage coached the American League team in the Taco Bell All-Star Legends & Celebrity Softball Game in Anaheim, California on July 12, 2010.

At the Hall of Fame induction in 2008, Gossage expressed gratitude to a number of baseball people who had helped him through his career, and several times described his Hall of Fame week experience as "amazing". The inductions included Dick Williams, his manager at San Diego. After the ceremonies, the two of them sat together for an ESPN interview on the podium, taking audience questions and gently ribbing each other, especially about the upper-deck home run Kirk Gibson hit off Gossage in Game 5 of the 1984 World Series.

The Yankees honored Gossage with a plaque in Monument Park on June 22, 2014.

In his retirement Gossage has expressed support of US President Donald Trump and an equal disdain for Trump's opponents. He has also openly criticized the Black Lives Matter movement and organization as well. Due to these comments and continuous criticism of New York Yankees players (especially Mariano Rivera), and front office executives such as Brian Cashman and Hal Steinbrenner, Gossage has been disinvited from Yankees Spring Training and other events such as "Old Timers' Day."

== See also ==
- List of Major League Baseball annual saves leaders
- Power pitcher
