= Dave Rajsich =

American baseball player (born 1951)

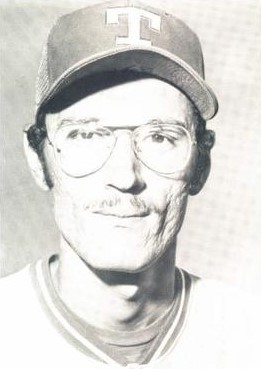
- Pitcher
- Born: September 28, 1951 (age 74); Youngstown, Ohio, U.S.
- Batted: Left Threw: Left

Professional debut
- MLB: July 2, 1978, for the New York Yankees
- NPB: 1984, for the Hiroshima Toyo Carp

Last appearance
- MLB: September 17, 1980, for the Texas Rangers
- NPB: 1984, for the Hiroshima Toyo Carp

MLB statistics
- Win–loss record: 2–1
- Earned run average: 3.36
- Strikeouts: 57

NPB statistics
- Win–loss record: 0–1
- Earned run average: 3.18
- Strikeouts: 15
- Stats at Baseball Reference

Teams
- New York Yankees (1978); Texas Rangers (1979–1980); Hiroshima Toyo Carp (1984)

David Christopher Rajsich (/ˈreɪsɪtʃ/ RAY-sitch; born September 28, 1951) is an American former professional baseball pitcher, who played in Major League Baseball (MLB) from 1978 to 1980 for the New York Yankees and Texas Rangers. He also played one season in Japan for the Hiroshima Toyo Carp in 1984. Rajsich was a southpaw pitcher known as "The Blade" because he was so tall and thin (6 ft 5 in (1.96 m), 175).

Rajsich is the brother of former Major League outfielder Gary Rajsich, with whom he played on the St. Petersburg Pelicans in the Senior Professional Baseball Association. He is currently the pitching coach for the Eugene Emeralds.
