= Mike Griffin (pitcher) =

American baseball player (born 1957)

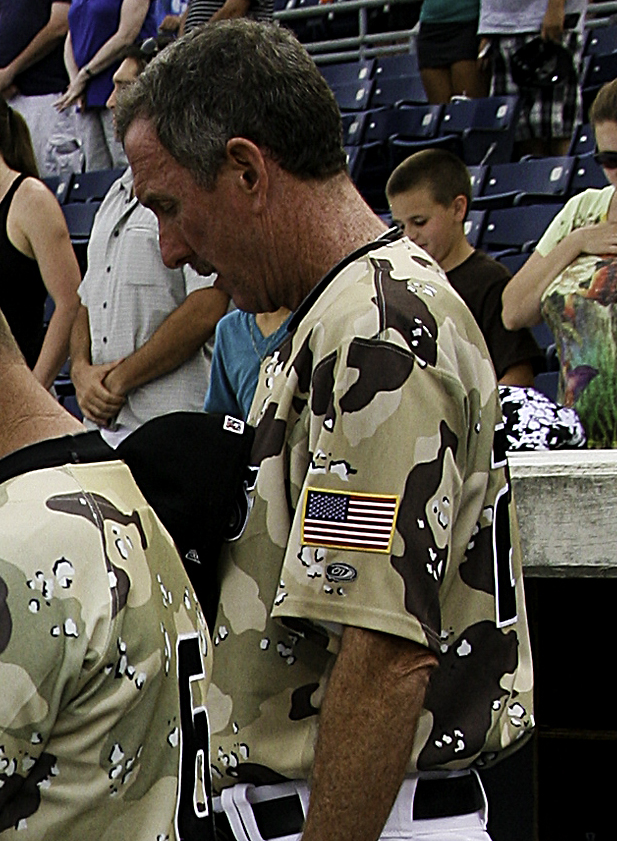
- Griffin with the Norfolk Tides in 2011
- Pitcher
- Born: June 26, 1957 (age 69); Colusa, California, U.S.
- Batted: Right Threw: Right

MLB debut
- September 17, 1979, for the New York Yankees

Last MLB appearance
- June 30, 1989, for the Cincinnati Reds

MLB statistics
- Win–loss record: 7–15
- Earned run average: 4.60
- Strikeouts: 101
- Stats at Baseball Reference

Teams
- New York Yankees (1979–1981); Chicago Cubs (1981); San Diego Padres (1982); Baltimore Orioles (1987); Cincinnati Reds (1989)

Michael Leroy Griffin (born June 26, 1957) is an American former Major League Baseball pitcher. He played during six seasons at the major league level for the New York Yankees, Chicago Cubs, San Diego Padres, Baltimore Orioles, and Cincinnati Reds. He was drafted by the Texas Rangers in the 3rd round of the 1976 amateur draft.

Griffin played his last season in the Cincinnati Reds organization with their Triple-A affiliate, the Nashville Sounds in 1989.

As of 2019, he was the pitching coach for the Norfolk Tides in the Baltimore Orioles organization.
