= Juan Beníquez =

Puerto Rican baseball player (born 1950)

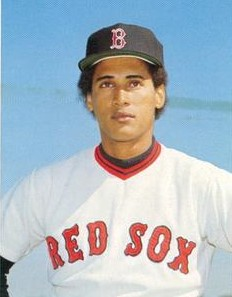
- Outfielder
- Born: May 13, 1950 (age 74); San Sebastián, Puerto Rico
- Batted: Right Threw: Right

MLB debut
- September 4, 1971, for the Boston Red Sox

Last MLB appearance
- May 30, 1988, for the Toronto Blue Jays

MLB statistics
- Batting average: .274
- Home runs: 79
- Runs batted in: 476
- Stats at Baseball Reference

Teams
- Boston Red Sox (1971–1972, 1974–1975); Texas Rangers (1976–1978); New York Yankees (1979); Seattle Mariners (1980); California Angels (1981–1985); Baltimore Orioles (1986); Kansas City Royals (1987); Toronto Blue Jays (1987–1988)

Career highlights and awards
- Gold Glove Award (1977)

Juan José Beníquez Torres (born May 13, 1950) is a Puerto Rican former center fielder in Major League Baseball who played for the Boston Red Sox, Texas Rangers, New York Yankees, Seattle Mariners, California Angels, Baltimore Orioles, Kansas City Royals and Toronto Blue Jays in all or parts of 17 seasons spanning 1971–1988. Listed at 5' 11" (1.82 m), 150 lb. (68 k), Beníquez batted and threw right-handed. He was born in San Sebastián, Puerto Rico.

== Career ==
A valuable role player for a long time, Beníquez spent 17 years in the major leagues playing for eight different American League clubs. He started his career with the Red Sox in 1971, appearing at shortstop as a backup for Luis Aparicio in part of two seasons, and later was switched to center field.

A Gold Glove Award winner with Texas in 1977, Beníquez posted four consecutive .300 seasons with California and Baltimore from 1983 through 1986, with a career-high .336 in 1984, and also hit three home runs in a game for the Orioles in 1986. He appeared in the postseason three times, including the 1975 World Series with the Red Sox.

A .274 career hitter, Beníquez hit 79 home runs with 610 runs and 476 RBI in 1,500 games played. After his major league career was over, he held the record for having played for eight American League teams.

Beníquez hit .359 while playing for the St. Lucie Legends of the Senior Professional Baseball Association in 1989.

== Gallery ==
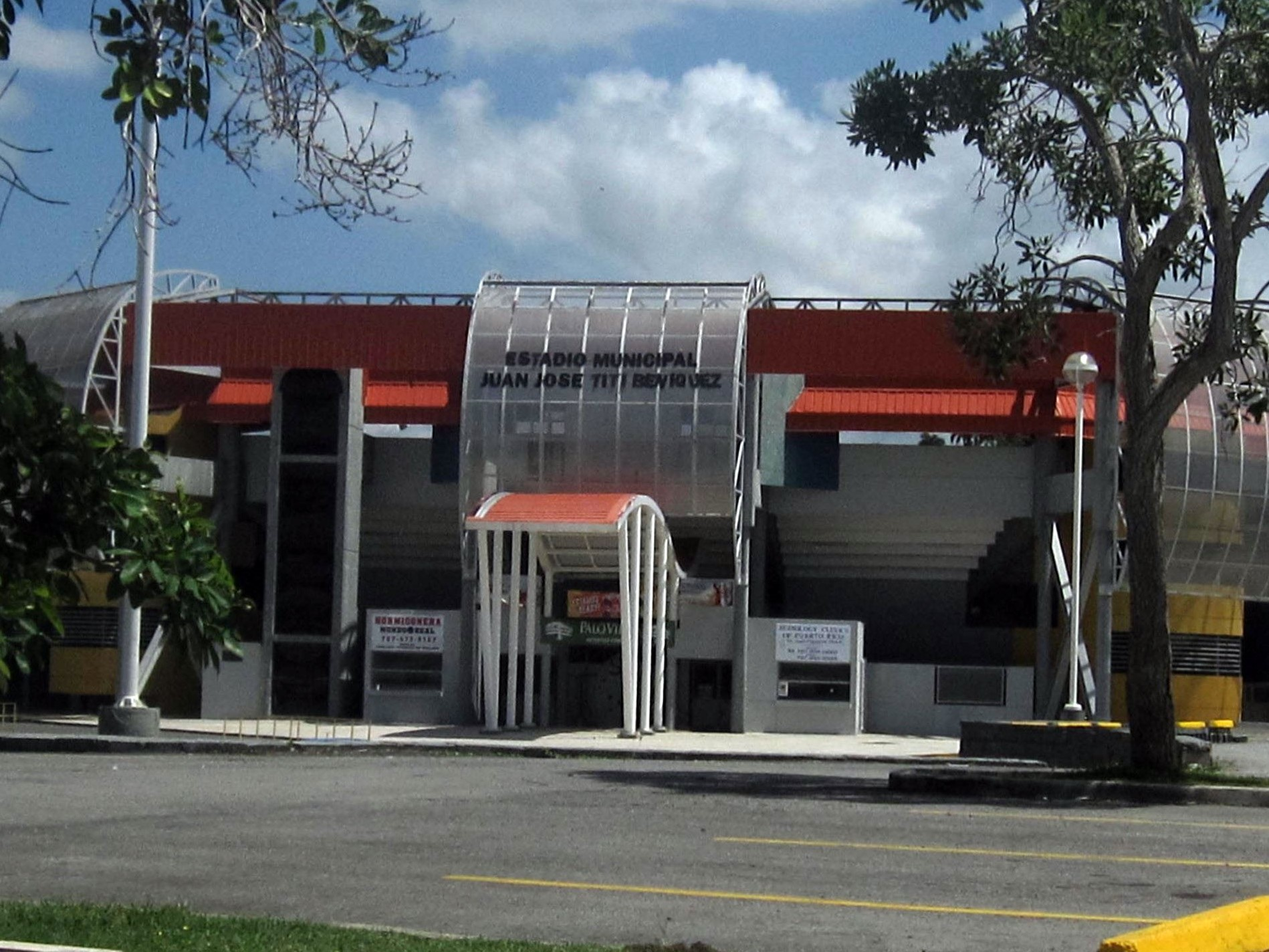
The municipal stadium in San Sebastián is named Estadio Juan Jose Titi Beniquez

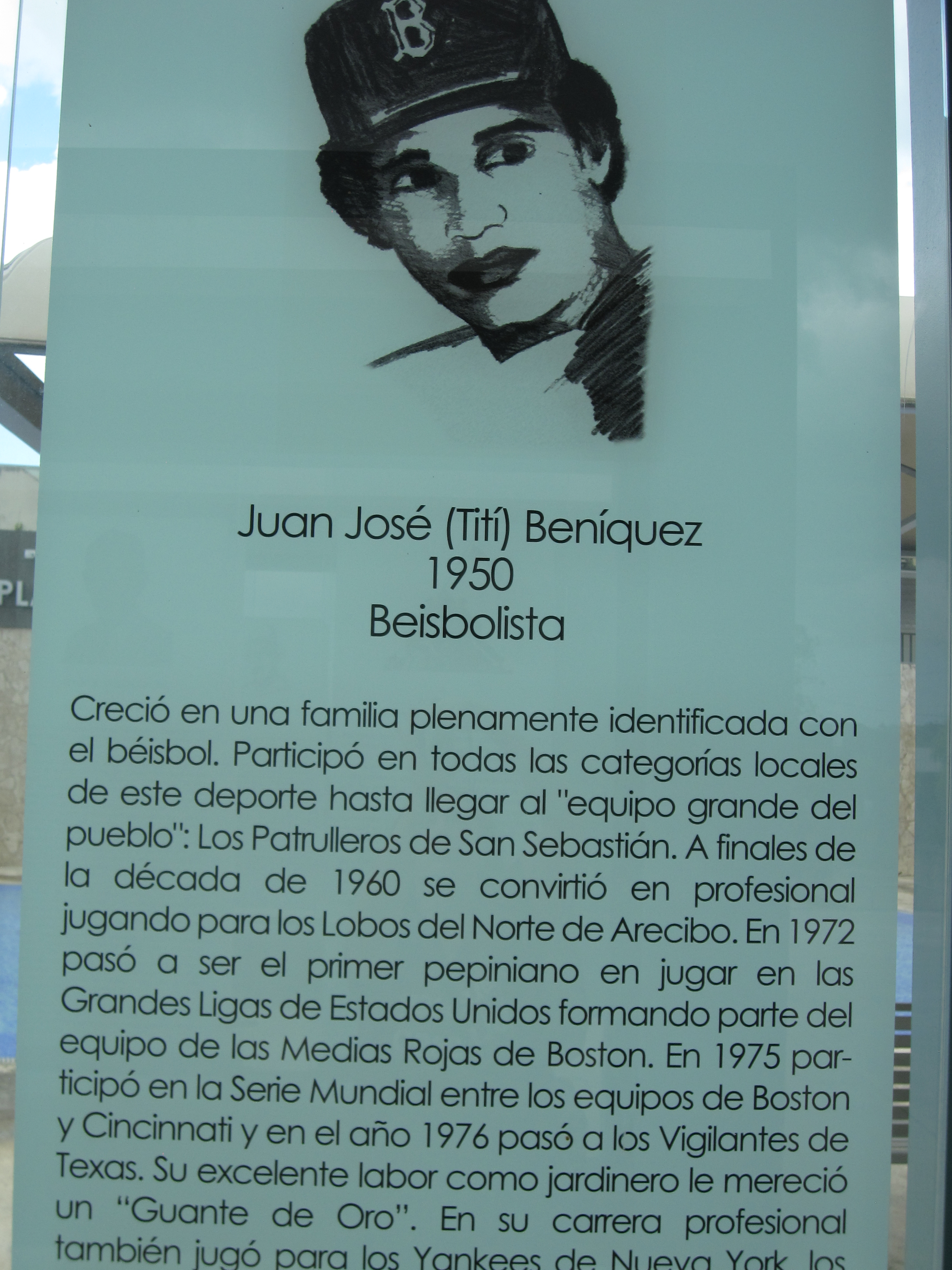
There is a Juan José Beníquez monument at Plaza de La Identidad in San Sebastián barrio-pueblo

== See also ==
- List of Major League Baseball players from Puerto Rico

== Sources ==
- Career statistics from Baseball Reference, or Fangraphs, or Baseball Reference (Minors), or Retrosheet, or SABR Biography Project
