= 1982 Seattle Mariners season =

1982 Seattle Mariners
- League: American League
- Division: West
- Ballpark: Kingdome
- City: Seattle, Washington
- Record: 76–86 (.469)
- Divisional place: 4th
- Owners: George Argyros
- General managers: Dan O'Brien Sr.
- Managers: Rene Lachemann
- Television: KSTW-TV 11
- Radio: KVI 570 AM (Dave Niehaus, Ken Wilson, Wes Stock)

The 1982 Seattle Mariners season was their sixth since the franchise creation, and the team finished fourth in the American League West with a record of 76–86 (.469).

During their first decade, this was the Mariners' best season, their best previous total was 67 wins in 1979. Slightly past the season's midpoint on July 8, their record was 45–38 (.542), just three games behind division-leading Kansas City. Seattle was at .500 (59–59) on August 17, but then dropped seven straight, and closed the season at home with six consecutive losses.

Home attendance at the Kingdome was 1.07 million, twelfth in the league; it was the first time over a million in five years, since the debut season of 1977.

This was Rene Lachemann's only full year as manager with Seattle; previously the manager at its Class AAA affiliate in Spokane. He took over the major league club in early May 1981, initially on an interim basis, succeeding Maury Wills. Lachemann signed a three-year contract in October 1981, and another during the season in 1982, then was relieved of his duties in late June 1983.

== Offseason ==
- October 23, 1981: The Mariners traded a player to be named later to the Kansas City Royals for Manny Castillo. The Mariners completed the deal by sending Bud Black to the Royals on March 2, 1982.
- December 9, 1981: Dan Meyer was traded by the Mariners to the Oakland Athletics for Rich Bordi.
- December 11, 1981: Tom Paciorek was traded by the Mariners to the Chicago White Sox for Todd Cruz, Rod Allen and Jim Essian.
- March 5, 1982: Gaylord Perry was signed as a free agent by the Mariners.

== Regular season ==
The Mariners began the season by beating the Minnesota Twins 11–7, setting a franchise record for most runs scored on Opening Day.

On May 6 against the New York Yankees, Gaylord Perry won his 300th career game, becoming the first pitcher to win 300 games since Early Wynn did so in 1963.

=== Season standings ===
AL West
Team	W	L	Pct.	GB	Home	Road
California Angels	93	69	.574	—	52‍–‍29	41‍–‍40
Kansas City Royals	90	72	.556	3	56‍–‍25	34‍–‍47
Chicago White Sox	87	75	.537	6	49‍–‍31	38‍–‍44
Seattle Mariners	76	86	.469	17	42‍–‍39	34‍–‍47
Oakland Athletics	68	94	.420	25	36‍–‍45	32‍–‍49
Texas Rangers	64	98	.395	29	38‍–‍43	26‍–‍55
Minnesota Twins	60	102	.370	33	37‍–‍44	23‍–‍58

=== Record vs. opponents ===
1982 American League record Sources:
Team	BAL	BOS	CAL	CWS	CLE	DET	KC	MIL	MIN	NYY	OAK	SEA	TEX	TOR
Baltimore	—	4–9	7–5	5–7	6–7	7–6	4–8	9–4–1	8–4	11–2	7–5	7–5	9–3	10–3
Boston	9–4	—	7–5	4–8	6–7	8–5	6–6	4–9	6–6	7–6	8–4	7–5	10–2	7–6
California	5–7	5–7	—	8–5	8–4	5–7	7–6	6–6	7–6	7–5	9–4	10–3	8–5	8–4
Chicago	7–5	8–4	5–8	—	6–6	9–3	3–10	3–9	7–6	8–4	9–4	6–7	8–5	8–4
Cleveland	7–6	7–6	4–8	6–6	—	6–7	2–10	7–6	8–4	4–9	4–8	9–3	7–5	7–6
Detroit	6–7	5–8	7–5	3–9	7–6	—	6–6	3–10	9–3	8–5	9–3	6–6	8–4	6–7
Kansas City	8–4	6–6	6–7	10–3	10–2	6–6	—	7–5	7–6	5–7	7–6	7–6	7–6	4–8
Milwaukee	4–9–1	9–4	6–6	9–3	6–7	10–3	5–7	—	7–5	8–5	7–5	8–4	7–5	9–4
Minnesota	4–8	6–6	6–7	6–7	4–8	3–9	6–7	5–7	—	2–10	3–10	5–8	5–8	5–7
New York	2–11	6–7	5–7	4–8	9–4	5–8	7–5	5–8	10–2	—	7–5	6–6	7–5	6–7
Oakland	5–7	4–8	4–9	4–9	8–4	3–9	6–7	5–7	10–3	5–7	—	6–7	5–8	3–9
Seattle	5–7	5–7	3–10	7–6	3–9	6–6	6–7	4–8	8–5	6–6	7–6	—	9–4	7–5
Texas	3–9	2–10	5–8	5–8	5–7	4–8	6–7	5–7	8–5	5–7	8–5	4–9	—	4–8
Toronto	3–10	6–7	4–8	4–8	6–7	7–6	8–4	4–9	7–5	7–6	9–3	5–7	8–4	—

=== Opening Day starters ===
- Floyd Bannister
- Bruce Bochte
- Manny Castillo
- Al Cowens
- Julio Cruz
- Todd Cruz
- Jim Essian
- Jim Maler
- Joe Simpson
- Richie Zisk

=== Notable transactions ===
- April 1: Shane Rawley was traded by the Mariners to the New York Yankees for Bill Caudill, Gene Nelson, and a player to be named later; Bobby Brown was sent to the Mariners on April 6.
- April 2: Dick Drago was released by the Mariners.
- April 2: Randy Stein was released by the Mariners.
- April 5: Mike Stanton was signed as a free agent by the Mariners.
- May 21: Rick Sweet was purchased by the Mariners from the New York Mets.
- August 6: Dave Revering was signed as a free agent by the Mariners.

==== Draft picks ====
- June 7: 1982 Major League Baseball draft
  - Spike Owen was selected by the Mariners in the first round (sixth pick).
  - Lance Johnson was selected by the Mariners in the 31st round, but did not sign.

=== Roster ===
1982 Seattle Mariners roster
Roster
Pitchers: 39 Larry Andersen; 19 Floyd Bannister; 45 Jim Beattie; 20 Rich Bordi; 37 Bill Caudill; 48 Bryan Clark; 27 Jerry Don Gleaton; 25 Mike Moore; 35 Ron Musselman; 24,43 Gene Nelson; 30 Edwin Núñez; 36 Gaylord Perry; 46 Mike Stanton; 34 Bob Stoddard; 32 Ed Vande Berg	Catchers: 11 Bud Bulling; 7 Jim Essian; 44 Dan Firova; 2 Orlando Mercado; 8 Rick Sweet; Infielders: 12 Manny Castillo; 6 Julio Cruz; 21 Todd Cruz; 1 Dave Edler; 29 Gary Gray; 33 Jim Maler; 26 Vance McHenry; 3 Domingo Ramos; 5 Dave Revering; 3 Paul Serna	Outfielders: 23 Bruce Bochte; 20 Thad Bosley; 44 Bobby Brown; 16 Al Cowens; 42 Dave Henderson; 26 John Moses; 18 Joe Simpson; 14 Steve Stroughter; Other batters: 1 Lenny Randle; 22 Richie Zisk	Manager: 15 Rene Lachemann; Coaches: 13 Chuck Cottier (Third Base); 5 Dave Duncan (Pitching); 28 Vada Pinson (First Base); 9 Bill Plummer (Bullpen)

== Game log ==
=== Regular season ===
1982 regular season game log: 76–86 (Home: 42–39; Away: 34–47)
April: 11–12 (Home: 7–3; Away: 4–9)

#	Date	Time (PT)	Opponent	Score	Win	Loss	Save	Time of Game	Attendance	Record	Box/ Streak

May: 14–14 (Home: 10–8; Away: 4–6)

#	Date	Time (PT)	Opponent	Score	Win	Loss	Save	Time of Game	Attendance	Record	Box/ Streak

June: 15–10 (Home: 5–7; Away: 10–3)

#	Date	Time (PT)	Opponent	Score	Win	Loss	Save	Time of Game	Attendance	Record	Box/ Streak

July: 12–14 (Home: 5–5; Away: 7–9)

#	Date	Time (PT)	Opponent	Score	Win	Loss	Save	Time of Game	Attendance	Record	Box/ Streak

August: 10–19 (Home: 4–11; Away: 6–8)

#	Date	Time (PT)	Opponent	Score	Win	Loss	Save	Time of Game	Attendance	Record	Box/ Streak

September: 14–14 (Home: 9–4; Away: 5–10)

#	Date	Time (PT)	Opponent	Score	Win	Loss	Save	Time of Game	Attendance	Record	Box/ Streak

October: 0–3 (Home: 0–0; Away: 0–3)

#	Date	Time (PT)	Opponent	Score	Win	Loss	Save	Time of Game	Attendance	Record	Box/ Streak

Legend: = Win = Loss = Postponement
Bold = Mariners team member

== Player stats ==
=== Batting ===
==== Starters by position ====
Note: Pos = Position; G = Games played; AB = At bats; H = Hits; Avg. = Batting average; HR = Home runs; RBI = Runs batted in

Pos	Player	G	AB	H	Avg.	HR	RBI
C	Rick Sweet	88	258	66	.256	4	24
1B	Jim Maler	64	221	50	.226	4	26
2B	Julio Cruz	154	549	133	.242	8	49
3B	Manny Castillo	138	506	130	.257	3	49
SS	Todd Cruz	136	492	113	.230	16	57
LF	Bruce Bochte	144	509	151	.297	12	70
CF	Dave Henderson	104	324	82	.253	14	48
RF	Al Cowens	146	560	151	.270	20	78
DH	Richie Zisk	131	503	147	.292	21	62

==== Other batters ====
Player	G	AB	H	Avg.	HR	RBI
Joe Simpson	105	296	76	.257	2	23
Gary Gray	80	269	69	.257	7	29
Bobby Brown	79	245	59	.241	4	17
Paul Serna	65	169	38	.225	3	8
Bud Bulling	56	154	34	.221	1	8
Jim Essian	48	153	42	.275	3	20
Dave Edler	40	104	29	.279	2	18
Dave Revering	29	82	17	.207	3	12
Steve Stroughter	26	47	8	.170	1	3
Lenny Randle	30	46	8	.174	0	1
Thad Bosley	22	46	8	.174	0	2
John Moses	22	44	14	.318	1	3
Domingo Ramos	8	26	4	.154	0	1
Orlando Mercado	9	17	2	.118	1	6
Dan Firova	3	5	0	.000	0	0
Vance McHenry	3	1	0	.000	0	0

=== Pitching ===
==== Starting pitchers ====
Player	G	IP	W	L	ERA	SO
Floyd Bannister	35	247.0	12	13	3.43	209
Gaylord Perry	32	216.2	10	12	4.40	116
Jim Beattie	28	172.1	8	12	3.34	140
Mike Moore	28	144.1	7	14	5.36	73
Gene Nelson	22	122.2	6	9	4.62	71
Bob Stoddard	9	67.1	3	3	2.41	24

==== Other pitchers ====
Player	G	IP	W	L	ERA	SO
Bryan Clark	37	114.2	5	2	2.75	70
Edwin Núñez	8	35.1	1	2	4.58	27
Rich Bordi	7	13.0	0	2	8.31	10

==== Relief pitchers ====
Player	G	W	L	SV	ERA	SO
Bill Caudill	70	12	9	26	2.35	111
Ed Vande Berg	78	9	4	5	2.37	60
Mike Stanton	56	2	4	7	4.16	49
Larry Andersen	40	0	0	1	5.99	32
Ron Musselman	12	1	0	0	3.45	9
Jerry Don Gleaton	3	0	0	0	13.50	1

== Farm system ==
Level	Team	League	Manager
AAA	Salt Lake City Gulls	Pacific Coast League	Bobby Floyd
AA	Lynn Sailors	Eastern League	Mickey Bowers
A	Bakersfield Mariners	California League	Ken Pape
A	Wausau Timbers	Midwest League	R. J. Harrison
A-Short Season	Bellingham Mariners	Northwest League	Jeff Scott
