= 1983 Seattle Mariners season =

1983 Seattle Mariners
- League: American League
- Division: West
- Ballpark: Kingdome
- City: Seattle, Washington
- Record: 60–102 (.370)
- Divisional place: 7th
- Owners: George Argyros
- General managers: Dan O'Brien Sr.
- Managers: Rene Lachemann; Del Crandall (June 25)
- Television: KSTW-TV 11
- Radio: KVI 570 AM (Dave Niehaus, Rick Rizzs, Wes Stock)

The 1983 Major League Baseball season was the seventh season in the history of the Seattle Mariners. They were seventh in the American League West at 60–102 (.370), 39 games behind, with the worst record in the major leagues. They became the first team to fail to sweep an opponent in any series.

In his third season as the Mariners' manager, Rene Lachemann was fired on June 25, succeeded by Del Crandall. At the time, the Mariners were 26–47 (.356), on an eight-game losing streak, and had the worst record in the majors. A former major league manager, Crandall was managing the Triple-A Albuquerque Dukes, the Pacific Coast League affiliate of the Los Angeles Dodgers.

== Offseason ==
- December 9, 1982: Rich Bordi was traded to the Chicago Cubs for Steve Henderson.
- January 20, 1983: Danny Tartabull was chosen from the Cincinnati Reds as a free agent compensation pick.
- January 27, 1983: Vance McHenry was traded to the Texas Rangers for Bob Babcock.
- January 28, 1983: Mike Hart was released.
- March 28, 1983: Bobby Brown was released.
- March 31, 1983: Ken Phelps was purchased from the Montreal Expos.

== Regular season ==
=== Season standings ===
AL West
Team	W	L	Pct.	GB	Home	Road
Chicago White Sox	99	63	.611	—	55‍–‍26	44‍–‍37
Kansas City Royals	79	83	.488	20	45‍–‍36	34‍–‍47
Texas Rangers	77	85	.475	22	44‍–‍37	33‍–‍48
Oakland Athletics	74	88	.457	25	42‍–‍39	32‍–‍49
California Angels	70	92	.432	29	35‍–‍46	35‍–‍46
Minnesota Twins	70	92	.432	29	37‍–‍44	33‍–‍48
Seattle Mariners	60	102	.370	39	30‍–‍51	30‍–‍51

=== Record vs. opponents ===
1983 American League record Sources:
Team	BAL	BOS	CAL	CWS	CLE	DET	KC	MIL	MIN	NYY	OAK	SEA	TEX	TOR
Baltimore	—	8–5	7–5	7–5	6–7	5–8	8–4	11–2	8–4	6–7	8–4	8–4	9–3	7–6
Boston	5–8	—	6–6	6–6	7–6	4–9	5–7	4–9	5–7	7–6	8–4	7–5	7–5	7–6
California	5–7	6–6	—	3–10	8–4	4–8	6–7	6–6	6–7	5–7	5–8	6–7	6–7	4–8
Chicago	5–7	6–6	10–3	—	8–4	8–4	9–4	4–8	8–5	8–4	8–5	12–1	8–5	5–7
Cleveland	7–6	6–7	4–8	4–8	—	5–8	7–5	3–10	6–6	6–7	7–5	8–4	3–9	4–9
Detroit	8–5	9–4	8–4	4–8	8–5	—	7–5	6–7	9–3	5–8	6–6	8–4	8–4	6–7
Kansas City	4–8	7–5	7–6	4–9	5–7	5–7	—	6–6	6–7	6–6	7–6	8–5	8–5–1	6–6
Milwaukee	2–11	9–4	6–6	8–4	10–3	7–6	6–6	—	8–4	4–9	6–6	5–7	8–4	8–5
Minnesota	4–8	7–5	7–6	5–8	6–6	3–9	7–6	4–8	—	4–8	4–9	9–4	5–8	5–7
New York	7–6	6–7	7–5	4–8	7–6	8–5	6–6	9–4	8–4	—	8–4	7–5	7–5	7–6
Oakland	4–8	4–8	8–5	5–8	5–7	6–6	6–7	6–6	9–4	4–8	—	9–4	2–11	6–6
Seattle	4–8	5–7	7–6	1–12	4–8	4–8	5–8	7–5	4–9	5–7	4–9	—	6–7	4–8
Texas	3–9	5–7	7–6	5–8	9–3	4–8	5–8–1	4–8	8–5	5–7	11–2	7–6	—	4–8
Toronto	6–7	6–7	8–4	7–5	9–4	7–6	6–6	5–8	7–5	6–7	6–6	8–4	8–4	—

=== Notable transactions ===
- April 4 – Clint Hurdle was released.
- May 31 – Bob Long was signed as a free agent.
- June 27 – Gaylord Perry was released.
- June 30 – Todd Cruz was purchased by the Baltimore Orioles.

=== Roster ===
1983 Seattle Mariners roster
Roster
Pitchers: 17 Glenn Abbott; 45 Jim Beattie; 39 Karl Best; 37 Bill Caudill; 48 Bryan Clark; 25 Mike Moore; 24 Gene Nelson; 30 Edwin Núñez; 36 Gaylord Perry; 46 Mike Stanton; 34 Bob Stoddard; 49 Roy Thomas; 32 Ed Vande Berg; 40 Matt Young	Catchers: 11 Bud Bulling; 2 Orlando Mercado; 6 Jamie Nelson; 8 Rick Sweet; Infielders: 20 Jamie Allen; 14 Tony Bernazard; 12 Manny Castillo; 11 Darnell Coles; 6 Julio Cruz; 21 Todd Cruz; 1 Dave Edler; 33 Jim Maler; 7 Spike Owen; 44 Ken Phelps; 23 Pat Putnam; 3 Domingo Ramos; 18 Harold Reynolds	Outfielders: 18 Rod Allen; 29 Phil Bradley; 16 Al Cowens; 42 Dave Henderson; 5 Steve Henderson; 14,26 John Moses; 10 Ricky Nelson; 21 Ron Roenicke; Other batters: 47 Al Chambers; 22 Richie Zisk	Manager: 1 Del Crandall; 4 Rene Lachemann; Coaches: 15 Chuck Cottier (Third base); 28 Vada Pinson (First base); 9 Bill Plummer (Bullpen); 35 Frank Funk (Pitching)

== Player stats ==
=== Batting ===
==== Starters by position ====
Note: Pos = Position; G = Games played; AB = At bats; H = Hits; Avg. = Batting average; HR = Home runs; RBI = Runs batted in

Pos	Player	G	AB	H	Avg.	HR	RBI
C	Rick Sweet	93	249	55	.221	1	22
1B	Pat Putnam	144	469	126	.269	19	67
2B	Tony Bernazard	80	300	80	.267	6	30
SS	Spike Owen	80	306	60	.196	2	21
3B	Jaime Allen	86	273	61	.223	4	21
LF	Steve Henderson	121	436	128	.294	10	54
CF	Dave Henderson	137	484	130	.269	17	55
RF	Al Cowens	110	356	73	.205	7	35
DH	Richie Zisk	90	285	69	.242	12	36

==== Other batters ====
Note: G = Games played; AB = At bats; H = Hits; Avg. = Batting average; HR = Home runs; RBI = Runs batted in

Player	G	AB	H	Avg.	HR	RBI
Ricky Nelson	98	291	74	.254	5	36
Todd Cruz	65	216	41	.190	7	21
Manny Castillo	90	203	42	.207	0	24
Ron Roenicke	59	198	50	.253	4	23
Julio Cruz	61	181	46	.254	2	12
Orlando Mercado	66	178	35	.197	1	16
John Moses	93	130	27	.208	0	6
Ken Phelps	50	127	30	.236	7	16
Domingo Ramos	53	127	36	.283	2	10
Jamie Nelson	40	96	21	.219	1	5
Darnell Coles	27	92	26	.283	1	6
Al Chambers	31	67	14	.209	1	7
Phil Bradley	23	67	18	.269	0	5
Jim Maler	26	66	12	.182	1	3
Dave Edler	29	63	12	.190	1	4
Harold Reynolds	20	59	12	.203	0	1
Rod Allen	11	12	2	.167	0	0
Bud Bulling	5	5	0	.000	0	0

=== Pitching ===
==== Starting pitchers ====
Note: G = Games pitched; IP = Innings pitched; W = Wins; L = Losses; ERA = Earned run average; SO = Strikeouts

Player	G	IP	W	L	ERA	SO
Matt Young	33	203.2	11	15	3.27	130
Jim Beattie	30	196.2	10	15	3.84	132
Mike Moore	22	128.0	6	8	4.71	108
Gaylord Perry	16	102.0	3	10	4.94	42
Glenn Abbott	14	82.1	5	3	4.59	38

==== Other pitchers ====
Note: G = Games pitched; IP = Innings pitched; W = Wins; L = Losses; ERA = Earned run average; SO = Strikeouts

Player	G	IP	W	L	ERA	SO
Bob Stoddard	35	175.2	9	17	4.41	87
Bryan Clark	41	162.1	7	10	3.94	76
Edwin Núñez	14	37.0	0	4	4.38	35
Gene Nelson	10	32.0	0	3	7.88	11

==== Relief pitchers ====
Note: G = Games pitched; W = Wins; L = Losses; SV = Saves; ERA = Earned run average; SO = Strikeouts

Player	G	W	L	SV	ERA	SO
Bill Caudill	63	2	8	26	4.71	73
Ed Vande Berg	68	2	4	5	3.36	49
Mike Stanton	50	2	3	7	3.32	47
Roy Thomas	43	3	1	1	3.45	77
Karl Best	4	0	1	0	13.50	3
Manny Castillo	1	0	0	0	23.63	2

== Farm system ==
Level	Team	League	Manager
AAA	Salt Lake City Gulls	Pacific Coast League	Bobby Floyd
AA	Chattanooga Lookouts	Southern League	Mickey Bowers and Bill Haywood
A	Bakersfield Mariners	California League	Greg Mahlberg
A	Wausau Timbers	Midwest League	R. J. Harrison
A-Short Season	Bellingham Mariners	Northwest League	Jeff Scott
