= 1980 Texas Rangers season =

1980 Texas Rangers
- League: American League
- Division: West
- Ballpark: Arlington Stadium
- City: Arlington, Texas
- Record: 76–85 (.472)
- Divisional place: 4th
- Owner: Eddie Chiles
- General managers: Eddie Robinson
- Managers: Pat Corrales
- Television: KXAS-TV (Frank Glieber, Eric Nadel, Mel Proctor)
- Radio: WBAP (Eric Nadel, Bill Merrill, Mel Proctor)

The 1980 Texas Rangers season was the 20th of the Texas Rangers franchise overall, their 9th in Arlington as the Rangers, and the 9th season at Arlington Stadium. The Rangers finished fourth in the American League West with a record of 76 wins and 85 losses.

== Offseason ==
- November 14, 1979: Eric Soderholm was traded by the Texas Rangers to the New York Yankees for players to be named later and cash. The New York Yankees sent Amos Lewis (minors) (December 13, 1979) and Ricky Burdette (minors) (December 13, 1979) to the Texas Rangers to complete the trade.
- December 6, 1979: Doyle Alexander, Larvell Blanks and $50,000 were traded by the Rangers to the Atlanta Braves for Adrian Devine and Pepe Frías.
- January 4, 1980: Larry McCall, Gary Gray, and Mike Bucci (minors) were traded by the Rangers to the Cleveland Indians for David Clyde and Jim Norris.
- January 11, 1980: 1980 Major League Baseball draft
  - Billy Taylor was drafted by the Rangers in the 2nd round. Player signed March 24, 1980.
  - Al Newman was drafted by the Rangers in the 3rd round, but did not sign.
  - Daryl Smith was drafted by the Rangers in the 6th round.
- February 15, 1980: Willie Montañez was traded by the Rangers to the San Diego Padres for Gaylord Perry, Tucker Ashford and Joe Carroll (minors).
- March 31, 1980: La Rue Washington and Chris Smith were traded by the Rangers to the Montreal Expos for Rusty Staub.
- March 31, 1980: David Clyde was released by the Rangers.

== Regular season ==
=== Season standings ===
AL West
Team	W	L	Pct.	GB	Home	Road
Kansas City Royals	97	65	.599	—	49‍–‍32	48‍–‍33
Oakland Athletics	83	79	.512	14	46‍–‍35	37‍–‍44
Minnesota Twins	77	84	.478	19½	44‍–‍36	33‍–‍48
Texas Rangers	76	85	.472	20½	39‍–‍41	37‍–‍44
Chicago White Sox	70	90	.438	26	37‍–‍42	33‍–‍48
California Angels	65	95	.406	31	30‍–‍51	35‍–‍44
Seattle Mariners	59	103	.364	38	36‍–‍45	23‍–‍58

=== Record vs. opponents ===
1980 American League record Sources:
Team	BAL	BOS	CAL	CWS	CLE	DET	KC	MIL	MIN	NYY	OAK	SEA	TEX	TOR
Baltimore	—	8–5	10–2	6–6	6–7	10–3	6–6	7–6	10–2	7–6	7–5	6–6	6–6	11–2
Boston	5–8	—	9–3	6–4	7–6	8–5	5–7	6–7	6–6	3–10	9–3	7–5	5–7	7–6
California	2–10	3–9	—	3–10	4–6	5–7	5–8	6–6	7–6	2–10	3–10	11–2	11–2	3–9
Chicago	6–6	4–6	10–3	—	5–7	2–10	5–8	5–7	5–8	5–7	6–7	6–7	6–7–2	5–7
Cleveland	7–6	6–7	6–4	7–5	—	3–10	5–7	3–10	9–3	5–8	6–6	8–4	6–6	8–5
Detroit	3–10	5–8	7–5	10–2	10–3	—	2–10	7–6	6–6	5–8	6–6	10–2–1	4–8	9–4
Kansas City	6–6	7–5	8–5	8–5	7–5	10–2	—	6–6	5–8	8–4	6–7	7–6	10–3	9–3
Milwaukee	6–7	7–6	6–6	7–5	10–3	6–7	6–6	—	7–5	5–8	7–5	9–3	5–7	5–8
Minnesota	2–10	6–6	6–7	8–5	3–9	6–6	8–5	5–7	—	4–8	6–7	7–6	9–3	7–5
New York	6–7	10–3	10–2	7–5	8–5	8–5	4–8	8–5	8–4	—	8–4	9–3	7–5	10–3
Oakland	5–7	3–9	10–3	7–6	6–6	6–6	7–6	5–7	7–6	4–8	—	8–5	7–6	8–4
Seattle	6–6	5–7	2–11	7–6	4–8	2–10–1	6–7	3–9	6–7	3–9	5–8	—	4–9	6–6
Texas	6–6	7–5	2–11	7–6–2	6–6	8–4	3–10	7–5	3–9	5–7	6–7	9–4	—	7–5
Toronto	2–11	6–7	9–3	7–5	5–8	4–9	3–9	8–5	5–7	3–10	4–8	6–6	5–7	—

=== Notable transactions ===
- June 3, 1980: Tom Henke was drafted by the Rangers in the 4th round of the 1980 Major League Baseball draft (secondary phase).
- July 11, 1980: Charlie Hough was purchased by the Rangers from the Los Angeles Dodgers.
- August 14, 1980: Gaylord Perry was traded by the Rangers to the New York Yankees for Ken Clay and a player to be named later. The Yankees completed the deal by sending Marvin Thompson (minors) to the Rangers on October 1.
- September 13, 1980: Sparky Lyle was traded by the Rangers to the Philadelphia Phillies for a player to be named later. The Phillies completed the deal by sending Kevin Saucier to the Rangers on November 19.

=== Roster ===
1980 Texas Rangers roster
Roster
Pitchers: 23 Brian Allard; 46 Bob Babcock; 29 John Butcher; 16 Ken Clay; 11 Steve Comer; 44 Danny Darwin; 35 Adrian Devine; 24 Ed Figueroa; 27 Jerry Don Gleaton; 49 Charlie Hough; 31 Ferguson Jenkins; 38 John Henry Johnson; 43 Don Kainer; 34 Jim Kern; 28 Dennis Lewallyn; 28 Sparky Lyle; 32 Jon Matlack; 33 Doc Medich; 36 Gaylord Perry; 26 Dave Rajsich	Catchers: 10 Jim Sundberg; Infielders: 29 Tucker Ashford; 25 Buddy Bell; 12 Odie Davis; 9 John Ellis; 3 Pepe Frías; 7 Bud Harrelson; 4 Nelson Norman; 18 Pat Putnam; 2 Mike Richardt; 14 Dave Roberts; 20 Rusty Staub; 1 Bump Wills	Outfielders: 6 Johnny Grubb; 30 Mike Hart; 19 Jim Norris; 0 Al Oliver; 17 Mickey Rivers; 5 Billy Sample; 22 Richie Zisk; Other batters: 8 Danny Walton	Manager: 45 Pat Corrales; Coaches: 41 Jackie Brown; 37 Rich Donnelly; 47 Fred Koenig; 48 Frank Lucchesi; 43 Jackie Moore

== Player stats ==
=== Batting ===
==== Starters by position ====
Note: Pos = Position; G = Games played; AB = At bats; H = Hits; Avg. = Batting average; HR = Home runs; RBI = Runs batted in

Pos	Player	G	AB	H	Avg.	HR	RBI
C	Jim Sundberg	151	505	138	.273	10	63
1B	Pat Putnam	147	410	108	.263	13	55
2B	Bump Wills	146	578	152	.263	5	58
SS	Pepe Frías	116	227	55	.242	0	10
3B	Buddy Bell	129	490	161	.329	17	83
LF	Al Oliver	163	656	209	.319	19	117
CF	Mickey Rivers	147	630	210	.333	7	60
RF	Johnny Grubb	110	274	76	.277	9	32
DH	Richie Zisk	135	448	130	.290	19	77

==== Other batters ====
Note: G = Games played; AB = At bats; H = Hits; Avg. = Batting average; HR = Home runs; RBI = Runs batted in

Player	G	AB	H	Avg.	HR	RBI
Rusty Staub	109	340	102	.300	9	52
Dave Roberts	101	235	56	.238	10	30
Billy Sample	99	204	53	.260	4	19
John Ellis	73	182	43	.236	1	23
Bud Harrelson	87	180	49	.272	1	9
Jim Norris	119	174	43	.247	0	16
Mike Richardt	22	71	16	.225	0	8
Tucker Ashford	15	32	4	.125	0	3
Nelson Norman	17	32	7	.219	0	1
Danny Walton	10	10	2	.200	0	1
Odie Davis	17	8	1	.125	0	0
Mike Hart	5	4	1	.250	0	0

=== Pitching ===
==== Starting pitchers ====
Note: G = Games pitched; IP = Innings pitched; W = Wins; L = Losses; ERA = Earned run average; SO = Strikeouts

Player	G	IP	W	L	ERA	SO
Jon Matlack	35	234.2	10	10	3.68	142
Doc Medich	34	204.1	14	11	3.92	91
Ferguson Jenkins	29	198.0	12	12	3.77	129
Gaylord Perry	24	155.0	6	9	3.43	107
Ken Clay	8	43.0	2	3	4.60	17
Steve Comer	12	41.2	2	4	7.99	9
Ed Figueroa	8	39.2	0	7	5.90	9
John Butcher	6	35.1	3	3	4.08	27
Don Kainer	4	19.2	0	0	1.83	10

==== Other pitchers ====
Note: G = Games pitched; IP = Innings pitched; W = Wins; L = Losses; ERA = Earned run average; SO = Strikeouts

Player	G	IP	W	L	ERA	SO
Brian Allard	5	14.1	0	1	5.65	10

==== Relief pitchers ====
Note: G = Games pitched; W = Wins; L = Losses; SV = Saves; ERA = Earned run average; SO = Strikeouts

Player	G	W	L	SV	ERA	SO
Danny Darwin	53	13	4	8	2.63	104
Sparky Lyle	49	3	2	8	4.69	43
Jim Kern	38	3	11	2	4.83	40
John Henry Johnson	33	2	2	4	2.33	44
Dave Rajsich	24	2	1	2	5.96	35
Charlie Hough	16	2	2	0	3.96	47
Adrian Devine	13	1	1	0	4.82	8
Bob Babcock	19	1	2	0	4.63	15
Jerry Don Gleaton	5	0	0	0	2.57	2
Dennis Lewallyn	4	0	0	0	7.94	1

=== Awards and honors ===
- Buddy Bell, 3B, Gold Glove 1980
- Al Oliver, Silver Slugger Award, 1980
- Jim Sundberg, C, Gold Glove, 1980

All-Star Game

== Farm system ==
Level	Team	League	Manager
AAA	Charleston Charlies	International League	Tom Burgess
AA	Tulsa Drillers	Texas League	Wayne Terwilliger
A	Asheville Tourists	South Atlantic League	Tom Robson
Rookie	GCL Rangers	Gulf Coast League	Andy Hancock
