= 1980 Seattle Mariners season =

1980 Seattle Mariners
- League: American League
- Division: West
- Ballpark: Kingdome
- City: Seattle, Washington
- Record: 59–103 (.364)
- Divisional place: 7th
- Owners: Danny Kaye
- General managers: Lou Gorman
- Managers: Darrell Johnson, Maury Wills
- Television: KING-TV 5
- Radio: KVI 570 AM (Dave Niehaus, Ken Wilson, Bill Freehan)

The 1980 Seattle Mariners season was their fourth since the franchise creation, and ended the season finishing seventh in the American League West with a record of 59–103 (.364).

== Offseason ==
- November 1, 1979: Ruppert Jones and Jim Lewis were traded by the Mariners to the New York Yankees for Jim Beattie, Rick Anderson, Juan Beníquez and Jerry Narron.
- December 6, 1979: Rafael Vásquez, Rob Pietroburgo (minors) and a player to be named later were traded by the Mariners to the Cleveland Indians for Ted Cox. The Mariners completed the deal by sending Larry Anderson to the Indians on March 29, 1980.
- December 20, 1979: Willie Horton was signed as a free agent by the Mariners.
- January 11, 1980: 1980 Major League Baseball draft (secondary phase)
  - Bill Mooneyham was drafted by the Mariners in the 1st round (13th pick), but did not sign.
  - Dan Firova was drafted by the Mariners in the 2nd round.

== Regular season ==
- September 30, 1980: While pitching for the Mariners against the Kansas City Royals, Rick Honeycutt taped a thumbtack to his finger to cut the ball. Royals baserunner Willie Wilson spotted the tack from second base. The umpires investigated and not only found the tack, but also a gash in Honeycutt's forehead. Honeycutt was ejected from the game, suspended for 10 games, and fined.

=== Season standings ===
AL West
| Team | W | L | Pct. | GB | Home | Road |
|---|---|---|---|---|---|---|
| Kansas City Royals | 97 | 65 | .599 | — | 49‍–‍32 | 48‍–‍33 |
| Oakland Athletics | 83 | 79 | .512 | 14 | 46‍–‍35 | 37‍–‍44 |
| Minnesota Twins | 77 | 84 | .478 | 19½ | 44‍–‍36 | 33‍–‍48 |
| Texas Rangers | 76 | 85 | .472 | 20½ | 39‍–‍41 | 37‍–‍44 |
| Chicago White Sox | 70 | 90 | .438 | 26 | 37‍–‍42 | 33‍–‍48 |
| California Angels | 65 | 95 | .406 | 31 | 30‍–‍51 | 35‍–‍44 |
| Seattle Mariners | 59 | 103 | .364 | 38 | 36‍–‍45 | 23‍–‍58 |

=== Record vs. opponents ===
1980 American League record Sources:
| Team | BAL | BOS | CAL | CWS | CLE | DET | KC | MIL | MIN | NYY | OAK | SEA | TEX | TOR |
|---|---|---|---|---|---|---|---|---|---|---|---|---|---|---|
| Baltimore | — | 8–5 | 10–2 | 6–6 | 6–7 | 10–3 | 6–6 | 7–6 | 10–2 | 7–6 | 7–5 | 6–6 | 6–6 | 11–2 |
| Boston | 5–8 | — | 9–3 | 6–4 | 7–6 | 8–5 | 5–7 | 6–7 | 6–6 | 3–10 | 9–3 | 7–5 | 5–7 | 7–6 |
| California | 2–10 | 3–9 | — | 3–10 | 4–6 | 5–7 | 5–8 | 6–6 | 7–6 | 2–10 | 3–10 | 11–2 | 11–2 | 3–9 |
| Chicago | 6–6 | 4–6 | 10–3 | — | 5–7 | 2–10 | 5–8 | 5–7 | 5–8 | 5–7 | 6–7 | 6–7 | 6–7–2 | 5–7 |
| Cleveland | 7–6 | 6–7 | 6–4 | 7–5 | — | 3–10 | 5–7 | 3–10 | 9–3 | 5–8 | 6–6 | 8–4 | 6–6 | 8–5 |
| Detroit | 3–10 | 5–8 | 7–5 | 10–2 | 10–3 | — | 2–10 | 7–6 | 6–6 | 5–8 | 6–6 | 10–2–1 | 4–8 | 9–4 |
| Kansas City | 6–6 | 7–5 | 8–5 | 8–5 | 7–5 | 10–2 | — | 6–6 | 5–8 | 8–4 | 6–7 | 7–6 | 10–3 | 9–3 |
| Milwaukee | 6–7 | 7–6 | 6–6 | 7–5 | 10–3 | 6–7 | 6–6 | — | 7–5 | 5–8 | 7–5 | 9–3 | 5–7 | 5–8 |
| Minnesota | 2–10 | 6–6 | 6–7 | 8–5 | 3–9 | 6–6 | 8–5 | 5–7 | — | 4–8 | 6–7 | 7–6 | 9–3 | 7–5 |
| New York | 6–7 | 10–3 | 10–2 | 7–5 | 8–5 | 8–5 | 4–8 | 8–5 | 8–4 | — | 8–4 | 9–3 | 7–5 | 10–3 |
| Oakland | 5–7 | 3–9 | 10–3 | 7–6 | 6–6 | 6–6 | 7–6 | 5–7 | 7–6 | 4–8 | — | 8–5 | 7–6 | 8–4 |
| Seattle | 6–6 | 5–7 | 2–11 | 7–6 | 4–8 | 2–10–1 | 6–7 | 3–9 | 6–7 | 3–9 | 5–8 | — | 4–9 | 6–6 |
| Texas | 6–6 | 7–5 | 2–11 | 7–6–2 | 6–6 | 8–4 | 3–10 | 7–5 | 3–9 | 5–7 | 6–7 | 9–4 | — | 7–5 |
| Toronto | 2–11 | 6–7 | 9–3 | 7–5 | 5–8 | 4–9 | 3–9 | 8–5 | 5–7 | 3–10 | 4–8 | 6–6 | 5–7 | — |

=== Notable transactions ===
- April 9, 1980: Dave Heaverlo was selected off waivers by the Mariners from the Oakland Athletics.
- June 14, 1980: Paul Serna was signed by the Mariners as an amateur free agent.
- June 16, 1980: Casey Parsons was purchased by the Mariners from the San Francisco Giants.

==== Draft picks ====
- June 3, 1980: 1980 Major League Baseball draft
  - Darnell Coles was drafted by the Mariners in the 1st round (6th pick). Player signed June 13, 1980.
  - John Moses was drafted by the Mariners in the 16th round.
  - Ernest Riles was drafted by the Mariners in the 21st round, but did not sign.

=== Roster ===
1980 Seattle Mariners roster
Roster
| Pitchers: 17 Glenn Abbott; 25 Rick Anderson; 38 Floyd Bannister; 45 Jim Beattie; 24 Rob Dressler; 55,60 Dave Heaverlo; 40 Rick Honeycutt; 27,54 Byron McLaughlin; 20 Mike Parrott; 41 Shane Rawley; 49 Dave Roberts; 44 Manny Sarmiento; 16 Gary Wheelock | Catchers: 5 Larry Cox; 21 Marc Hill; 3 Jerry Narron; 15 Bob Stinson; Infielders: 22 Kim Allen; 4 Jim Anderson; 23 Bruce Bochte; 10 Ted Cox; 6 Julio Cruz; 15 Dave Edler; 11 Mario Mendoza; 2 Larry Milbourne; 1 Bill Stein | Outfielders: 12 Juan Beníquez; 19 Rod Craig; 7 Dan Meyer; 14 Tom Paciorek; 8 Leon Roberts; 18 Joe Simpson; 26 Reggie Walton; Other batters: 53 Willie Horton | Manager: 22 Darrell Johnson; 30 Maury Wills; Coaches: 31 Don Bryant (Bullpen); 35 Frank Funk (First Base/Pitching); 30 Bill Mazeroski (Third Base); 28 Vada Pinson (Hitting); 32 Wes Stock (Pitching) |

== Player stats ==
=== Batting ===
==== Starters by position ====
Note: Pos = Position; G = Games played; AB = At bats; H = Hits; Avg. = Batting average; HR = Home runs; RBI = Runs batted in

| Pos | Player | G | AB | H | Avg. | HR | RBI |
|---|---|---|---|---|---|---|---|
| C | Larry Cox | 105 | 243 | 49 | .202 | 4 | 20 |
| 1B | Bruce Bochte | 148 | 520 | 156 | .300 | 13 | 78 |
| 2B | Julio Cruz | 119 | 422 | 88 | .209 | 2 | 16 |
| SS | Mario Mendoza | 114 | 277 | 68 | .245 | 2 | 14 |
| 3B | Ted Cox | 83 | 247 | 60 | .243 | 2 | 23 |
| LF | Dan Meyer | 146 | 531 | 146 | .275 | 11 | 71 |
| CF | Juan Beníquez | 70 | 237 | 54 | .228 | 6 | 21 |
| RF | Leon Roberts | 119 | 374 | 94 | .251 | 10 | 33 |
| DH | Willie Horton | 97 | 335 | 74 | .221 | 8 | 36 |

==== Other batters ====
Note: G = Games played; AB = At bats; H = Hits; Avg. = Batting average; HR = Home runs; RBI = Runs batted in

| Player | G | AB | H | Avg. | HR | RBI |
|---|---|---|---|---|---|---|
| Tom Paciorek | 126 | 418 | 114 | .273 | 15 | 59 |
| Joe Simpson | 129 | 365 | 91 | .249 | 3 | 34 |
| Jim Anderson | 116 | 317 | 72 | .227 | 8 | 30 |
| Larry Milbourne | 106 | 258 | 68 | .264 | 0 | 26 |
| Rod Craig | 70 | 240 | 57 | .238 | 3 | 20 |
| Bill Stein | 67 | 198 | 53 | .268 | 5 | 27 |
| Jerry Narron | 48 | 107 | 21 | .196 | 4 | 18 |
| Bob Stinson | 48 | 107 | 23 | .215 | 1 | 8 |
| Dave Edler | 28 | 89 | 20 | .225 | 3 | 9 |
| Reggie Walton | 31 | 83 | 23 | .277 | 2 | 9 |
| Marc Hill | 29 | 70 | 16 | .229 | 2 | 9 |
| Kim Allen | 23 | 51 | 12 | .235 | 0 | 3 |

=== Pitching ===
==== Starting pitchers ====
Note: G = Games pitched; IP = Innings pitched; W = Wins; L = Losses; ERA = Earned run average; SO = Strikeouts

| Player | G | IP | W | L | ERA | SO |
|---|---|---|---|---|---|---|
| Floyd Bannister | 32 | 217.2 | 9 | 13 | 3.47 | 155 |
| Glenn Abbott | 31 | 215.0 | 12 | 12 | 4.10 | 78 |
| Rick Honeycutt | 30 | 203.1 | 10 | 17 | 3.94 | 79 |
| Jim Beattie | 33 | 187.1 | 5 | 15 | 4.85 | 67 |
| Gary Wheelock | 1 | 3.0 | 0 | 0 | 6.00 | 1 |

==== Other pitchers ====
Note: G = Games; IP = Innings pitched; W = Wins; L = Losses; ERA = Earned run average; SO = Strikeouts

| Player | G | IP | W | L | ERA | SO |
|---|---|---|---|---|---|---|
| Rob Dressler | 30 | 149.1 | 4 | 10 | 3.98 | 50 |
| Mike Parrott | 27 | 94.0 | 1 | 16 | 7.28 | 53 |
| Rick Anderson | 5 | 9.2 | 0 | 0 | 3.72 | 7 |

==== Relief pitchers ====
Note: G = Games pitched; W = Wins; L = Losses; SV = Saves; ERA = Earned run average; SO = Strikeouts

| Player | G | W | L | SV | ERA | SO |
|---|---|---|---|---|---|---|
| Shane Rawley | 59 | 7 | 7 | 13 | 3.33 | 68 |
| Dave Heaverlo | 60 | 6 | 3 | 4 | 3.89 | 42 |
| Byron McLaughlin | 45 | 3 | 6 | 2 | 6.85 | 41 |
| Dave Roberts | 37 | 2 | 3 | 3 | 4.37 | 47 |
| Manny Sarmiento | 9 | 0 | 1 | 1 | 3.68 | 15 |

== Farm system ==
| Level | Team | League | Manager |
|---|---|---|---|
| AAA | Spokane Indians | Pacific Coast League | Rene Lachemann |
| AA | Lynn Sailors | Eastern League | Bobby Floyd |
| A | San Jose Missions | California League | Bill Plummer |
| A-Short Season | Bellingham Mariners | Northwest League | Jeff Scott |

LEAGUE CO-CHAMPIONS: Bellingham
