= Willie Horton (baseball) =

American baseball player (born 1942)

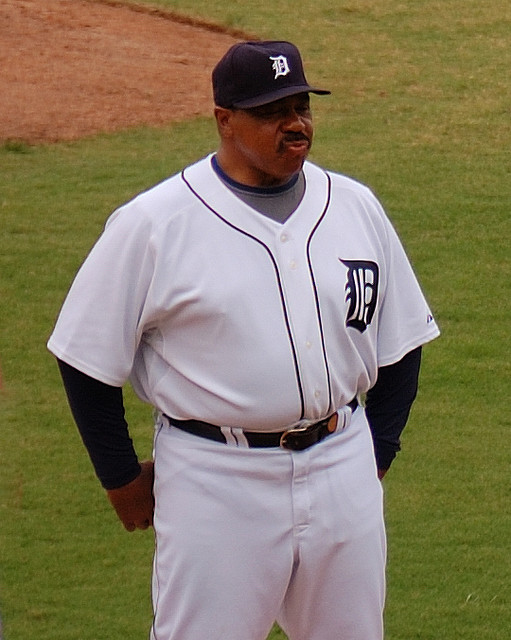
- Horton in his Detroit Tigers uniform in 2010
- Left fielder / Designated hitter
- Born: October 18, 1942 (age 84); Arno, Virginia, U.S.
- Batted: Right Threw: Right

MLB debut
- September 10, 1963, for the Detroit Tigers

Last MLB appearance
- October 5, 1980, for the Seattle Mariners

MLB statistics
- Batting average: .273
- Home runs: 325
- Runs batted in: 1,163
- Stats at Baseball Reference

Teams
- As player: Detroit Tigers (1963–1977); Texas Rangers (1977); Cleveland Indians (1978); Oakland Athletics (1978); Toronto Blue Jays (1978); Seattle Mariners (1979–1980); As coach: New York Yankees (1985); Chicago White Sox (1986)

Career highlights and awards
- 4× All-Star (1965, 1968, 1970, 1973); World Series champion (1968); Detroit Tigers No. 23 retired

Willie Horton (born William Wattison Horton; October 18, 1942), nicknamed "Willie the Wonder", is an American former professional baseball left fielder and designated hitter who played in Major League Baseball from 1963 to 1980, primarily for the Detroit Tigers.

Over an eighteen-year career spanning six American League teams, he was a four-time All-Star and won a World Championship with the 1968 Tigers. He hit 20 or more home runs seven times, and his 325 career home runs ranked sixth among AL right-handed hitters when he retired. He enjoyed his best season in 1968, finishing second in the AL with 36 homers, a .543 slugging average and 278 total bases. In the later years of his career, he was twice named the AL's top designated hitter.

== Early years ==
Horton is the youngest of 14 children of James Horton and his wife Lillian (Wattison) Horton. He was born in Arno, Virginia, a small community in the corporate limits of Appalachia, Virginia. He hit a home run at Tiger Stadium at 16 years old during an all-city high school game. After winning a city championship with Detroit Northwestern High School in 1959 he signed with the Tigers in 1961, playing for the Tigers' farm team, the Duluth Dukes, on the shores of Lake Superior.

== Professional career ==
=== Detroit Tigers ===
Horton posted double-digit home run totals in 12 regular seasons from 1965 to 1976, and hit two home runs in a game on 30 occasions. He had a career-high 36 home runs in 1968, a pitcher's year in which Detroit won the World Series; he finished second in the AL to Frank Howard in homers, slugging and total bases. In a year in which the league batting average was .230 and Carl Yastrzemski won the batting title with a .301 mark, Horton's .285 average was good for fourth in the AL. He finished fourth in the MVP voting.

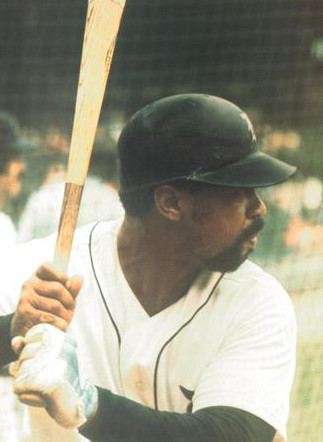
Horton in 1975

He also batted .304 in the World Series against the St. Louis Cardinals that year. In order to combine Horton's offensive power with a good defense, manager Mayo Smith moved regular center fielder Mickey Stanley to shortstop as a replacement for Ray Oyler, who was benched because of his paltry .135 batting average. He kept Al Kaline, a routine Gold Glove Award winner, in right field and put Jim Northrup in center field; the two had platooned in right field for much of the year. When the Tigers were safely ahead in the game, Oyler would replace Stanley at shortstop, batting in Horton's lineup spot; Stanley returned to center field, and Northrup would move over to replace Horton in left field. In Game 2, Horton had a solo home run to give the Tigers an early 1–0 lead, and they won 8–1. While not considered a great defensive outfielder, he made a pivotal play in the fifth inning of Game 5. With the Cardinals leading the Series 3–1 and the game 3–2, Lou Brock doubled with one out. He tried to score on Julián Javier's single, but chose not to slide; Horton's throw reached catcher Bill Freehan on one bounce to beat Brock on a close play. Horton still lists the throw as the most memorable moment of his career. Detroit scored three runs in the seventh inning to win 5–3, and went on to win Games 6 and 7 as well; Horton had two runs and two RBI in the 13–1 blowout in Game 6, and two hits and a run in the final 4–1 victory.

Horton was a four-time member of the AL All-Star team (1965, 1968, 1970 and 1973). On July 18, 1969, playing against the Cleveland Indians, he tied Boston Braves outfielder Earl Clark's record for most put outs in a nine inning game by a left fielder, nine, a record that has since been tied by Jacoby Ellsbury of the Boston Red Sox. He hit three home runs against the Milwaukee Brewers on June 9, 1970.

In 1970, in a game in Milwaukee against the Brewers, Horton likely saved fellow Tiger Al Kaline's life. While chasing a fly ball, Kaline collided with outfielder Jim Northrup and fell onto the warning track. Immediately he began to suffocate as, on impact, his jaw had gotten locked and his tongue obstructed his breathing. Realizing what happened, Horton rushed over and pried opened Kaline's mouth, clearing his airway.

On April 14, 1974, he hit a popup which struck and killed a pigeon at Fenway Park. He was named the AL's Outstanding Designated Hitter in 1975 after hitting 25 home runs with 92 RBI.

=== Texas Rangers ===
After being supplanted as left fielder by Steve Kemp and designated hitter by Rusty Staub, Horton was traded from the Tigers to the Texas Rangers for Steve Foucault on April 12, 1977. He again hit three home runs in a 7–3 win over the Kansas City Royals at Royals Stadium one month later on May 15. He spent 1978 playing for the Cleveland Indians, Oakland Athletics and Toronto Blue Jays, traded there along with Phil Huffman from the Athletics to the Toronto Blue Jays for former batting champion and top DH Rico Carty on August 15, 1978. He played with the Seattle Mariners from 1979 to 1980.

=== Navegantes del Magallanes ===
In 1978, he joined the Venezuelan team Navegantes del Magallanes as a designated hitter and manager. In his first season with Magallanes, Horton earned the nickname "El Brujo" ("The Wizard"), taking the team from last place the previous season to first, winning the 1979 Caribbean Series championship with a 5–1 record.

=== Seattle Mariners ===
In 1979 with the Mariners, he was again named the AL's Outstanding Designated Hitter after hitting .279 with 29 HR and a career-high 106 RBI, and he received The Sporting News Comeback Player of the Year Award as well. On June 5, against the Tigers against John Hiller, he hit what seemed to be his 300th career home run, but it struck a speaker hanging from the roof of the Kingdome and bounced onto the field for a single; he would collect number 300 the next day against Jack Morris. His Mariners record of 106 RBI was broken by Alvin Davis in 1984, his marks of 180 hits and 296 total bases were broken by Phil Bradley in 1985, and his record of 29 home runs was broken by Gorman Thomas in 1985. His record of 646 at bats was broken by Alex Rodriguez in 1998; Horton remains one of only four Mariners to have played the full 162 games in a season. He played his final major league game on October 5, 1980. He was traded back to the Rangers from the Mariners along with Rick Honeycutt, Leon Roberts, Mario Mendoza and Larry Cox for Richie Zisk, Jerry Don Gleaton, Rick Auerbach, Ken Clay, Brian Allard and minor-league right-handed pitcher Steve Finch in an 11-player blockbuster deal on December 18, 1980. Horton played two more years in the Pacific Coast League and another season in Mexican baseball.

== Career summary ==
In an 18-season career, Horton posted a .273 batting average and .457 slugging average with 1993 hits, 284 doubles, 1,163 RBIs, 873 runs and 20 stolen bases in 2028 games. His 325 home runs in the AL placed him sixth behind only Harmon Killebrew (573), Jimmie Foxx (524), teammate Al Kaline (399), Rocky Colavito (371) and Joe DiMaggio (361) among right-handed hitters.

Among his baseball superstitions was his use of the same batting helmet throughout his career; he repainted it when he changed teams.

== Honors ==
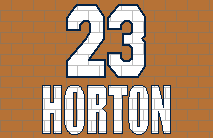
Willie Horton's number 23 was retired by the Detroit Tigers in 2000.

On July 15, 2000 Horton became just the sixth former player given the ultimate honor by the Detroit Tigers; a statue of Horton was placed in Comerica Park and his number 23 was retired, joining a select group that includes former Tigers players Ty Cobb (who played before uniforms had numbers), Charlie Gehringer (number 2), Hank Greenberg (number 5), Al Kaline (number 6), and Hal Newhouser (number 16).

In 2004, the state of Michigan proclaimed October 18 to be "Willie Horton Day", which has been held annually since, in honor of Horton who had been involved with charities in the city since his playing days. Then-Governor Jennifer Granholm said of the proclamation:

Willie Horton is one of those rare baseball players who doesn't need a diamond to truly sparkle and shine—he's a star on and off the field. This fitting recognition will continue to inform future generations of his accomplishments."

In 2019, the city of Detroit unveiled "Willie Horton Drive", named in honor of the slugger. It is situated at the intersection of Canfield Street and the John C. Lodge service drive.

Horton was inducted into the Michigan Baseball Hall of Fame on August 17, 2019.

== Post-playing life ==
After retiring, Horton coached for the New York Yankees and Chicago White Sox.

Since 2003, Horton has served as a Special Assistant to Tigers President/CEO/General Manager, originally Dave Dombrowski, followed by Al Avila, and currently Scott Harris. Former Tigers teammate Al Kaline also held this position, and the two threw out the first pitch of the 2006 World Series at Comerica Park.

On Opening Day 2013, Horton threw out the first pitch at Comerica Park in Detroit. The Tigers went on to win 8–3 over the New York Yankees.

Horton's autobiography 23: Detroit's Own Willie the Wonder, the Tigers' First Black Great was published in July 2022.

Horton and his wife, Gloria reside in Bloomfield Hills, Michigan. The couple have seven children and 21 grandchildren.

In September 1968, Horton legally had his name changed from "William Wattison Horton" to simply "Willie Horton", saying that he preferred "Willie" to his more formal, former name.

== See also ==
- List of Major League Baseball career home run leaders
- List of Major League Baseball career runs batted in leaders
