= The Sporting News Comeback Player of the Year Award =

American Major League Baseball award

The Sporting News Comeback Player of the Year Award is the oldest of three annual awards in Major League Baseball given to one player in each league who has reemerged as a star in that season. It was established in 1965. The winner in each league is selected by the TSN editorial staff.

In 2005, Major League Baseball officially sponsored its own Comeback Player of the Year Award for the first time. TSN and MLB honored the same players in 2005—Ken Griffey Jr. in the National League and Jason Giambi in the American League. The Players Choice Awards, awarded by the Major League Baseball Players Association, also began a Comeback Player honor in 1992.

Listed below are the players honored with the TSN award by year, name, team and league.

== Honorees ==
Year	American League		National League	
Year	Winner	Team	Winner	Team
1965	Norm Cash (1)	Detroit Tigers	Vern Law	Pittsburgh Pirates
1966	Boog Powell (1)	Baltimore Orioles	Phil Regan	Los Angeles Dodgers
1967	Dean Chance	Minnesota Twins	Mike McCormick	San Francisco Giants
1968	Ken Harrelson	Boston Red Sox	Alex Johnson	Cincinnati Reds
1969	Tony Conigliaro	Boston Red Sox	Tommie Agee	New York Mets
1970	Clyde Wright	California Angels	Jim Hickman	Chicago Cubs
1971	Norm Cash (2)	Detroit Tigers	Al Downing	Los Angeles Dodgers
1972	Luis Tiant	Boston Red Sox	Bobby Tolan	Cincinnati Reds
1973	John Hiller	Detroit Tigers	Davey Johnson	Atlanta Braves
1974	Ferguson Jenkins	Texas Rangers	Jimmy Wynn	Los Angeles Dodgers
1975	Boog Powell (2)	Cleveland Indians	Randy Jones	San Diego Padres
1976	Dock Ellis	New York Yankees	Tommy John	Los Angeles Dodgers
1977	Eric Soderholm	Chicago White Sox	Willie McCovey	San Francisco Giants
1978	Mike Caldwell	Milwaukee Brewers	Willie Stargell	Pittsburgh Pirates
1979	Willie Horton	Seattle Mariners	Lou Brock	St. Louis Cardinals
1980	Matt Keough	Oakland Athletics	Jerry Reuss	Los Angeles Dodgers
1981	Richie Zisk	Seattle Mariners	Bob Knepper	Houston Astros
1982	Andre Thornton	Cleveland Indians	Joe Morgan	San Francisco Giants
1983	Alan Trammell	Detroit Tigers	John Denny	Philadelphia Phillies
1984	Dave Kingman	Oakland Athletics	Joaquín Andújar	St. Louis Cardinals
1985	Gorman Thomas	Seattle Mariners	Rick Reuschel	Pittsburgh Pirates
1986	John Candelaria	California Angels	Ray Knight	New York Mets
1987	Bret Saberhagen (1)	Kansas City Royals	Rick Sutcliffe (1)	Chicago Cubs
1988	Storm Davis	Oakland Athletics	Tim Leary	Los Angeles Dodgers
1989	Bert Blyleven	California Angels	Lonnie Smith	Atlanta Braves
1990	Dave Winfield	California Angels	John Tudor	St. Louis Cardinals
1991	José Guzmán	Texas Rangers	Terry Pendleton	Atlanta Braves
1992	Rick Sutcliffe (2)	Baltimore Orioles	Gary Sheffield	San Diego Padres
1993	Bo Jackson	Chicago White Sox	Andrés Galarraga (1)	Colorado Rockies
1994	José Canseco	Texas Rangers	Tim Wallach	Los Angeles Dodgers
1995	Tim Wakefield	Boston Red Sox	Ron Gant	Cincinnati Reds
1996	Kevin Elster	Texas Rangers	Eric Davis	Cincinnati Reds
1997	David Justice	Cleveland Indians	Darren Daulton	Philadelphia Phillies / Florida Marlins
1998	Bret Saberhagen (2)	Boston Red Sox	Greg Vaughn	San Diego Padres
1999	John Jaha	Oakland Athletics	Rickey Henderson	New York Mets
2000	Frank Thomas	Chicago White Sox	Andrés Galarraga (2)	Atlanta Braves
2001	Rubén Sierra	Texas Rangers	Matt Morris	St. Louis Cardinals
2002	Tim Salmon	Anaheim Angels	Mike Lieberthal	Philadelphia Phillies
2003	Gil Meche	Seattle Mariners	Javy López	Atlanta Braves
2004	Paul Konerko	Chicago White Sox	Chris Carpenter (1)	St. Louis Cardinals
2005	Jason Giambi	New York Yankees	Ken Griffey Jr.	Cincinnati Reds
2006	Jim Thome	Chicago White Sox	Nomar Garciaparra	Los Angeles Dodgers
2007	Carlos Peña	Tampa Bay Devil Rays	Dmitri Young	Washington Nationals
2008	Cliff Lee	Cleveland Indians	Fernando Tatís	New York Mets
2009	Aaron Hill	Toronto Blue Jays	Chris Carpenter (2)	St. Louis Cardinals
2010	Vladimir Guerrero	Texas Rangers	Tim Hudson	Atlanta Braves
2011	Jacoby Ellsbury	Boston Red Sox	Lance Berkman	St. Louis Cardinals
2012	Adam Dunn	Chicago White Sox	Buster Posey (1)	San Francisco Giants
2013	Mariano Rivera	New York Yankees	Francisco Liriano	Pittsburgh Pirates
2014	Chris Young	Seattle Mariners	Casey McGehee	Miami Marlins
2015	Prince Fielder	Texas Rangers	Matt Harvey	New York Mets
2016	Mark Trumbo	Baltimore Orioles	José Fernández	Miami Marlins
2017	Mike Moustakas	Kansas City Royals	Greg Holland	Colorado Rockies
2018	David Price	Boston Red Sox	Matt Kemp	Los Angeles Dodgers
2019	Hunter Pence	Texas Rangers	Josh Donaldson	Atlanta Braves
2020	Carlos Carrasco	Cleveland Indians	Daniel Bard	Colorado Rockies
2021	Trey Mancini	Baltimore Orioles	Buster Posey (2)	San Francisco Giants
2022	Justin Verlander	Houston Astros	Brandon Drury	Cincinnati Reds / San Diego Padres
2023	Tyler Glasnow	Tampa Bay Rays	Cody Bellinger	Chicago Cubs
2024	Vladimir Guerrero Jr.	Toronto Blue Jays	Chris Sale	Atlanta Braves
2025	Jacob deGrom	Texas Rangers	Christian Yelich	Milwaukee Brewers
2026	Yordan Alvarez	Houston Astros	Zack Wheeler	Philadelphia Phillies

== Notes ==
- The only players to be named twice in the American League are Norm Cash, Boog Powell and Bret Saberhagen.
- The only players to be named twice in the National League are Andrés Galarraga, Chris Carpenter and Buster Posey.
- The only player to be named in both leagues is Rick Sutcliffe.
- The only player to be named posthumously is José Fernández; he died in a boating accident on September 25, 2016.

== See also ==
- Baseball awards
- List of MLB awards
- TSN Player of the Year
- TSN Pitcher of the Year
- TSN Rookie of the Year
- SN Reliever of the Year
- TSN Manager of the Year
- TSN Executive of the Year
