= Mendoza Line =

Baseball threshold for incompetent hitting

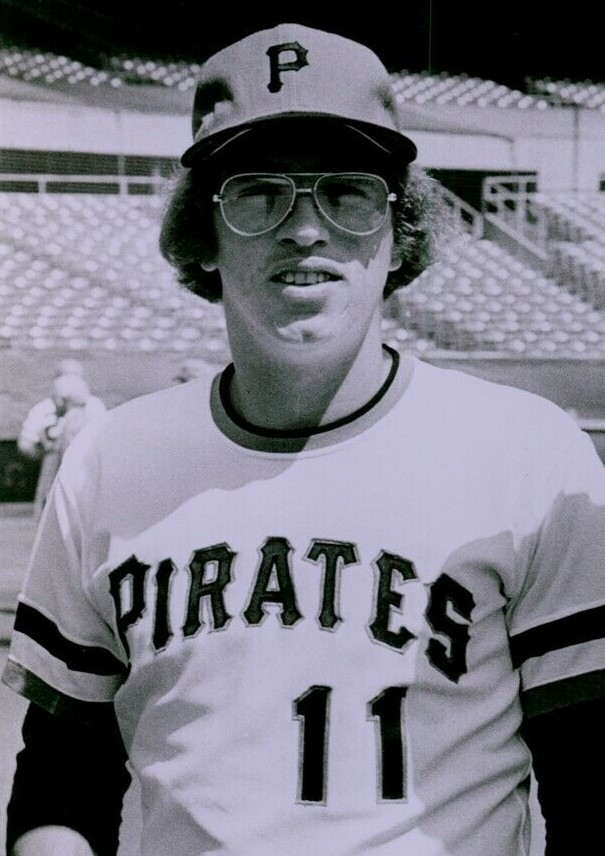
Mario Mendoza, who had a career batting average of .215

The Mendoza Line is baseball jargon for a .200 batting average, the supposed threshold for offensive futility in Major League Baseball.

The term derives from light-hitting shortstop Mario Mendoza, who failed to reach .200 five times in his nine major league seasons. When a position player's batting average falls below .200, the player is said to be "below the Mendoza Line.” Some commentators consider this the threshold below which a position player's presence on the roster at a particular level cannot be justified regardless of the player's defensive abilities. Conversely, a qualifying sub-.200 batting average against over the course of a season is considered a significant achievement for a pitcher.

== Origin ==
Mendoza was a lightly used shortstop from Chihuahua, Mexico, who played for three franchises during a nine-season Major League Baseball career. While his fielding was highly regarded, his hitting was not. His batting average was between .180 and .199 in five seasons out of nine.

When he had trouble staying above .200 in 1979, teammates began to chide him. "...Tom Paciorek and Bruce Bochte used it to make fun of me," Mendoza said in 2010. "Then they were giving George Brett a hard time because he had a slow start that year, so they told him, 'Hey, man, you're going to sink down below the Mendoza Line if you're not careful.' And then Brett mentioned it to Chris Berman from ESPN, and eventually it spread and became a part of the game."

Berman deflects credit back to Brett in popularizing the term. "Mario Mendoza — it's all George Brett," Berman said. "We used it all the time in those 1980s SportsCenters. It was just a humorous way to describe how someone was hitting."

Mendoza ended up finishing 1979 below his own "line", at .198. His hitting improved modestly in 1980 and 1981; he improved enough that, even with another sub-.200 in his final season of 1982, he raised his career batting average to .215.

However, Mendoza hit exactly .200 in the post-season, going 1-for-5 in 3 games with Pittsburgh in the 1974 NLCS.

Mendoza returned to Mexico in 1983 and played seven seasons in the Mexican League, and achieved a more than respectable .291 career batting average in that league.

== Use outside of baseball ==
The term is also used outside of baseball to convey a similar connotation of unacceptably subpar performance:

- "The U.S. 10-year note yield declined below 2%... before moving back above the Mendoza Line... to 2.09% by early afternoon."
- "A sub-$2,000 per theater average... is the Mendoza Line of box office numbers..."
- "Republican pollster Neil Newhouse... argues that these numbers have crossed below the political 'Mendoza line'..."
- On an episode of How I Met Your Mother, Barney explains the "Vicky Mendoza Diagonal" line, which determines how attractive a girl must be in order for him to date her depending on how "crazy" she is.
- During the 2025 NFL season, some commentators referred to securing the number 1 draft pick for 2026 as "crossing the Mendoza Line".

== See also ==
- Interstate (baseball), hitting between .100 and .199
