= Mario Mendoza =

Mexican baseball player (born 1950)

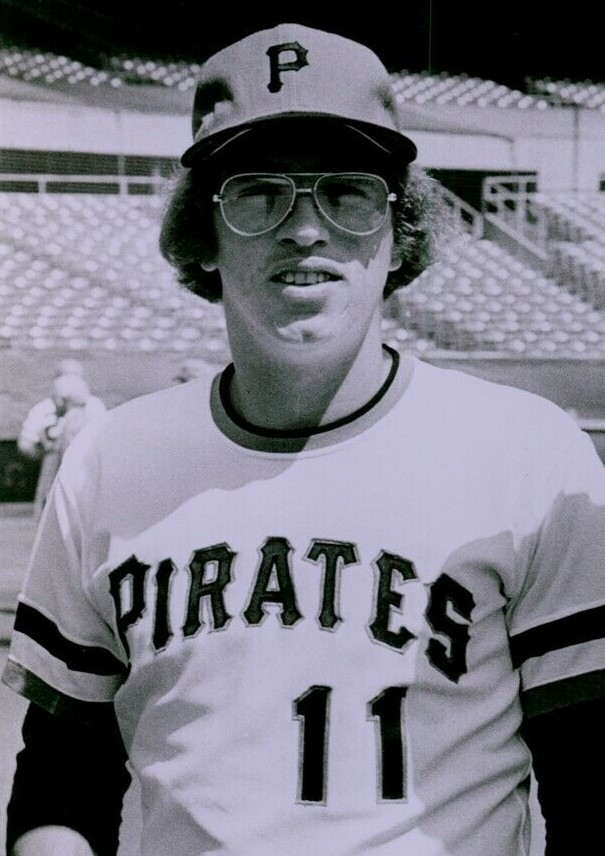
- Mendoza with the Pittsburgh Pirates in 1974
- Shortstop / Manager
- Born: 26 December 1950 (age 75); Chihuahua, Chihuahua, Mexico
- Batted: Right Threw: Right

MLB debut
- April 26, 1974, for the Pittsburgh Pirates

Last MLB appearance
- May 22, 1982, for the Texas Rangers

MLB statistics
- Batting average: .215
- Home runs: 4
- Runs batted in: 101
- Stats at Baseball Reference

Teams
- Pittsburgh Pirates (1974–1978); Seattle Mariners (1979–1980); Texas Rangers (1981–1982)

Member of the Mexican Professional

Baseball Hall of Fame
- Induction: 2000
Medals
Men's baseball
Representing Mexico
Central American and Caribbean Games
| Bronze medal – third place | 1970 Panama City | Team |

Mario Mendoza Aizpuru (born 26 December 1950) is a Mexican former professional baseball infielder who later managed Saraperos de Saltillo of the Mexican League. Mendoza, a lifetime .215 hitter, is best known for being the source of the name for the threshold for batting ineptitude, the "Mendoza Line", meaning a batting average of .200. Mendoza managed in the minor leagues and in Mexico after his nine-year Major League Baseball (MLB) playing career. He is a member of the Mexican Professional Baseball Hall of Fame.

== Playing career ==
=== Pittsburgh Pirates ===
Mendoza first caught the eye of the Pittsburgh Pirates while playing for the Mexico City Diablos Rojos of the Mexican League in 1970. His ability for picking grounders prompted the Pirates to purchase Mendoza's contract from Mexico City.

Mendoza played four seasons in the Pirates' farm system before debuting with the Pirates on April 26, 1974, as a pinch runner for Willie Stargell. With the Pirates down 3–2 in the ninth inning to the Houston Astros, Mendoza scored the tying run in the Pirates' 4–3 victory. For the season, Mendoza batted .221 in 91 games, but had only 177 plate appearances. He was primarily a defensive replacement when starting Pirates shortstop Frank Taveras (who himself only had a .246 batting average in 1974) had been pinch hit for late in a game. He reached the postseason for the only time in his career during his rookie season. He started Game Three of the 1974 National League Championship Series against the Los Angeles Dodgers, and went one for three with a walk and an RBI infield single.

On June 28, 1977, Mendoza pitched two innings of mop up duty in the second game of a doubleheader against the St. Louis Cardinals. The Pirates, having used seven pitchers in a doubleheader with the Montreal Expos two days earlier, had already used three pitchers in the first-game 6–1 loss. Completely depleted of pitchers, Pirates manager Chuck Tanner started relief pitcher Grant Jackson in the second game, pitching six innings despite giving up ten runs (only six of which were earned), and the Pirates were already down 10–3 by the time Mendoza was handed the ball. After getting Keith Hernandez to line into a double play to end his first inning of work, Mendoza gave up a three-run home run to Ken Reitz the following inning, giving Mendoza a career 13.50 earned run average.

Mendoza remained with the Pirates as a defensive replacement through 1978, playing some second and third base as well. In five seasons with the Pirates, Mendoza batted .221, .180, .185, .198, and .218, respectively.

=== Seattle Mariners ===
Mendoza's request for a trade was granted at the Winter Meetings on December 5, 1978, when he was dealt along with Odell Jones and Rafael Vásquez from the Pirates to the Seattle Mariners for Enrique Romo, Tom McMillan and Rick Jones. In his first season with the Mariners in 1979, he made a career-high 401 plate appearances in a career high 148 games and 132 starts at shortstop. While providing the Mariners with a steady glove, he ended the season with a .198 batting average—making him only the fourth major leaguer ever to play as many as 148 games in a season and fail to break .200. The following year, Mendoza fared better at the plate, batting .245 in 277 at-bats.

=== Texas Rangers ===
Mendoza was traded along with Willie Horton, Rick Honeycutt, Leon Roberts and Larry Cox from the Mariners to the Texas Rangers for Richie Zisk, Jerry Don Gleaton, Rick Auerbach, Ken Clay, Brian Allard and minor-league right-handed pitcher Steve Finch in an 11-player blockbuster deal on December 18, 1980. In 1981, Mendoza split time at short with Mark Wagner with Mendoza receiving the bulk of the playing time, and finishing with a .231 batting average. During the following season, he was released in June 1982 with a .118 batting average.

=== Return to Mexico ===
Mendoza received an invitation to spring training with the Pirates in 1983. After failing to make the team, he accepted a player-coach position with their triple A Pacific Coast League affiliate, the Hawaii Islanders. After one season in Hawaii, Mendoza returned to Mexico as a player/manager of the Monclova Acereros.

Mendoza only managed Monclova for part of his first season back in the Mexican League, but his playing career in Mexico lasted seven seasons after his major league career ended. His career batting average in Mexico was a substantially better .291; he earned the nickname Manos de Seda, or Silk Hands, for his fielding prowess.

== Managerial career ==
Bill Bavasi, an executive with the Anaheim Angels, believed Mendoza was someone who had potential as a manager and offered him the reins to the Angels' Class A advanced California League affiliate, Lake Elsinore Storm, for the 1998 season. He remained with the Storm until they became a San Diego Padres affiliate in 2001, managing his son, Mario Jr., in 2000.

Mendoza was inducted into the Mexican Professional Baseball Hall of Fame in 2000. After managing the San Francisco Giants' double A Texas League affiliate Shreveport SwampDragons in 2002, Mendoza returned to Mexico to manage Dos Laredos in 2003, the Angelopolis Tigres in 2004, the Olmecas de Tabasco in 2005 and 2006, and the Piratas de Campeche in 2007. He was named manager of the Broncos de Reynosa during the 2012 season. He was dismissed as Reynosa's manager in May 2013 after the team started in first place with a 30–23 win–loss record; team leadership cited differences of opinion with Mendoza.

Mendoza became manager of the Saraperos de Saltillo of the Mexican League on 4 May 2023. He was sacked by the team on 5 June 2023.

== The "Mendoza Line" ==
Mendoza claims that the term was invented in 1979 by his Mariner teammates Bruce Bochte and Tom Paciorek. Bochte and Paciorek would tease Mendoza about his low batting average, as he struggled to hit .200 for the season - and throughout his career, finishing below .200 five times in his nine seasons in the big leagues.

Although Mendoza finished his career with a batting average of .215, the Mendoza Line is almost universally accepted as being at .200, an average Mendoza flirted with all that year. From May 10 to the end of the season it fluctuated between .175 and .210, usually staying within just a few points of .200 before finishing at .198.

The 'Mendoza Line' phrase was overheard by Kansas City Royals batting champion George Brett, who used it in an interview in 1980 during his pursuit of a .400 batting average. He reportedly stated, "The first thing I look for in the Sunday papers is who is below the Mendoza line." The reference caught the attention of ESPN announcer Chris Berman, and the "Mendoza Line" became part of popular culture. However, Brett also praised Mendoza's defensive abilities, claiming Mendoza robbed him of sure base hits on several occasions with exceptional defensive plays.
