= Rick Honeycutt =

American baseball player and coach (born 1954)

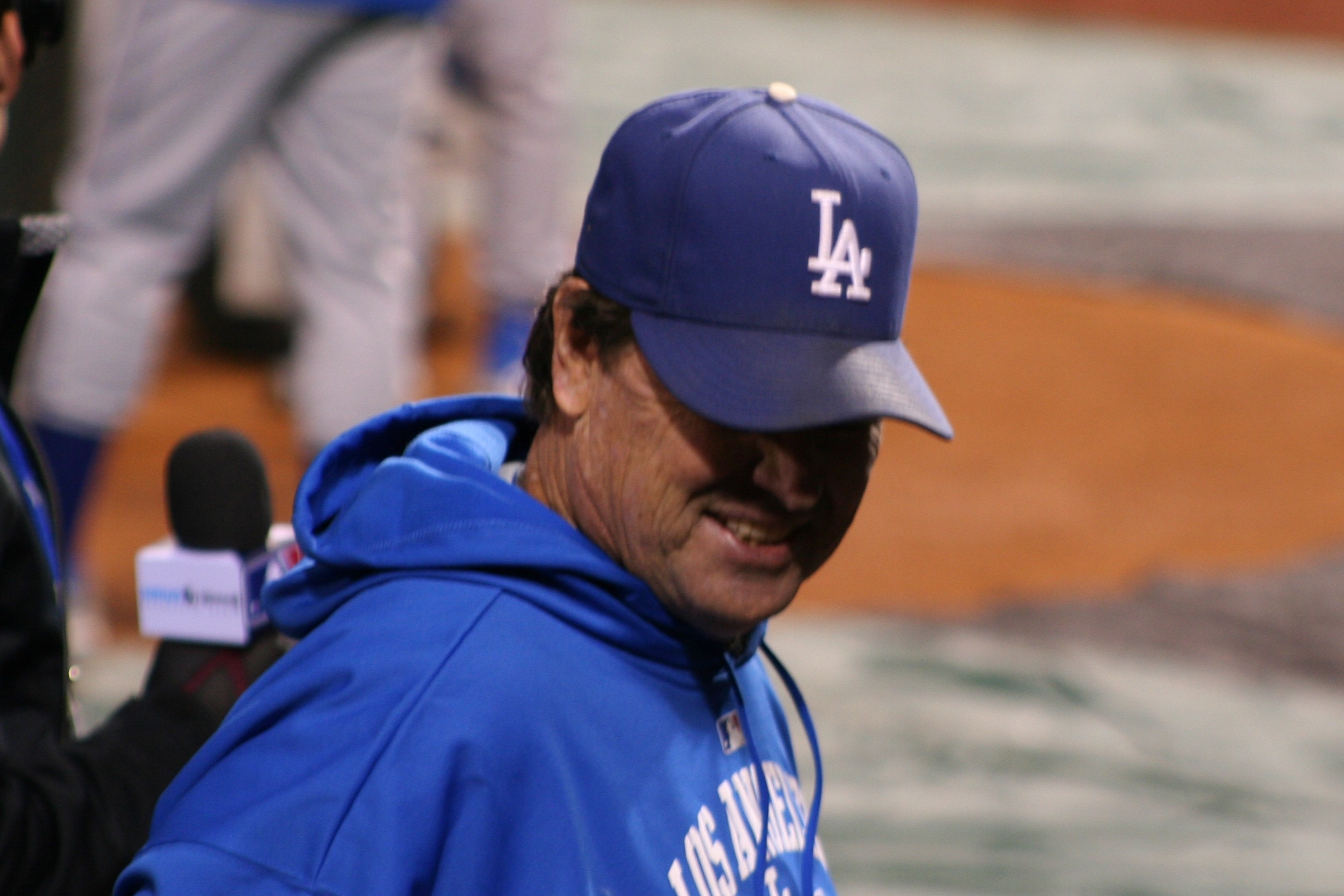
- Honeycutt with the Los Angeles Dodgers
- Pitcher
- Born: June 29, 1954 (age 72); Chattanooga, Tennessee, U.S.
- Batted: Left Threw: Left

MLB debut
- August 24, 1977, for the Seattle Mariners

Last MLB appearance
- May 2, 1997, for the St. Louis Cardinals

MLB statistics
- Win–loss record: 109–143
- Earned run average: 3.72
- Strikeouts: 1,038
- Stats at Baseball Reference

Teams
- As player: Seattle Mariners (1977–1980); Texas Rangers (1981–1983); Los Angeles Dodgers (1983–1987); Oakland Athletics (1987–1993); Texas Rangers (1994); Oakland Athletics (1995); New York Yankees (1995); St. Louis Cardinals (1996–1997); As coach: Los Angeles Dodgers (2006–2019)

Career highlights and awards
- 2× All-Star (1980, 1983); World Series champion (1989); AL ERA leader (1983)

Frederick Wayne Honeycutt (born June 29, 1954), nicknamed "Honey", is an American former professional baseball coach and pitcher. Honeycutt pitched in Major League Baseball (MLB) for six different teams over 21 years, from 1977 to 1997. He pitched in 30 post-season games, including 20 League Championship Series games and seven World Series games, and never lost a game, going 3–0. Honeycutt gave up no runs in the 1988 and 1990 post-seasons, and was a member of the Oakland Athletics' 1989 World Series championship team. He was also the pitching coach for the Los Angeles Dodgers from 2006 through 2019.

== Playing career ==
Honeycutt was born in Chattanooga, Tennessee, and graduated from Lakeview High School in Fort Oglethorpe, Georgia. He was drafted in the 14th round (336th overall) of the 1972 Major League Baseball draft by the Baltimore Orioles, but did not sign.

Honeycutt played for the Tennessee Volunteers baseball team from 1973 to 1976, where he was an All-American first baseman-pitcher and won the Southeastern Conference batting title with a .404 mark. He played summer ball in Liberal, Kansas, in the Jayhawk League, for Bob Cerv.

Honeycutt was drafted again in the 17th round (405th overall) of the 1976 MLB draft by the Pittsburgh Pirates. After 1 1/2 seasons in their minor league system, the Pirates traded him to the Seattle Mariners in August 1977 to complete an earlier trade for Dave Pagan.

Honeycutt made his major league debut on August 24, 1977, against the Toronto Blue Jays. He pitched two scoreless innings of relief, struck out three, and allowed two hits. His first start was against the New York Yankees on August 31. He pitched 7 1/3 innings in that start, allowing three earned runs in a no-decision. He finished the season 0–1 with a 4.34 ERA in 10 games (three starts).

Honeycutt earned his first career win in his first start the following year, beating the Minnesota Twins on April 7, 1978. In the game, he allowed three earned runs and four walks in seven innings as the Mariners won 6–3. In 26 games (24 starts) during the 1978 season, he posted a 5–11 record and a 4.89 ERA.

Honeycutt matured into a control pitcher, being selected to the 1980 All-Star Game. While he was pitching on September 30, 1980, he was caught using a thumbtack to illegally cut the ball. He was ejected and suspended for 10 games. On December 18, 1980, Honeycutt was traded along with Willie Horton, Leon Roberts, Mario Mendoza and Larry Cox from the Mariners to the Texas Rangers for Richie Zisk, Jerry Don Gleaton, Rick Auerbach, Ken Clay, Brian Allard and minor-league right-handed pitcher Steve Finch in an 11-player blockbuster deal. In 1983, Honeycutt represented the Rangers in the All-Star Game. On August 19, 1983, Honeycutt was traded from the Rangers to the Los Angeles Dodgers for Dave Stewart and Ricky Wright. Honeycutt led the American League in ERA in 1983 with 2.42, although he was traded to the Dodgers late in the season.

On August 29, 1987, the Dodgers traded Honeycutt to the Oakland Athletics for a player to be named later, who would be Tim Belcher. Converted from a starting pitcher to relief in 1988 by Oakland, he became a set-up man to Dennis Eckersley, posting a series of sub-3.7 ERAs from 1988 through 1993. He was the oldest major league player in both 1996 and 1997.

Honeycutt made 268 starts and 529 relief appearances in his career, logging 2,160 innings pitched and compiling 109 wins and 38 saves.

== Coaching career ==
Following his playing career, Honeycutt spent a year coaching his kids' teams before joining the Dodgers as their minor league pitching coordinator.

Honeycutt joined the Dodgers' coaching staff as pitching coach for the 2006 season. He also launched a sporting goods and apparel business in Chattanooga, Tennessee.

Honeycutt and Mariano Duncan were the only holdovers from Grady Little's 2007 coaching staff to return on new Dodgers' manager Joe Torre's 2008 coaching staff. Honeycutt also remained as pitching coach when Don Mattingly replaced Torre after the 2010 season. When Mattingly left the team after the 2015 season, Honeycutt was the only coach to remain on the staff for new manager Dave Roberts.

Due to a back injury, Honeycutt stepped down as pitching coach for the Dodgers after the 2019 season to take a new role as a special assistant to the team. Honeycutt's 14 years as the Dodgers pitching coach (under four different managers) tied Ron Perranoski for the longest tenure in that role in the organization's history.

== See also ==
- List of Major League Baseball annual ERA leaders

Awards and achievements
Preceded by Andre Dawson	Oldest Player in the National League; 1996–1997	Succeeded by Dennis Martínez
Preceded by Jim Colborn	Los Angeles Dodgers Pitching Coach; 2006–2019	Succeeded by Mark Prior
