= Larry Cox (baseball) =

American baseball player (1947–1990)

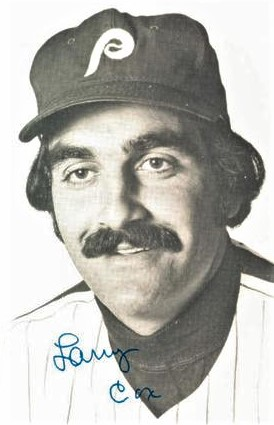
- Catcher
- Born: September 11, 1947; Bluffton, Ohio, U.S.
- Died: February 17, 1990 (aged 42); Bellefontaine, Ohio, U.S.
- Batted: Right Threw: Right

MLB debut
- April 18, 1973, for the Philadelphia Phillies

Last MLB appearance
- May 23, 1982, for the Chicago Cubs

MLB statistics
- Batting average: .221
- Home runs: 12
- Runs batted in: 85
- Stats at Baseball Reference

Teams
- Philadelphia Phillies (1973–1975); Seattle Mariners (1977); Chicago Cubs (1978); Seattle Mariners (1979–1980); Texas Rangers (1981); Chicago Cubs (1982)

Larry Eugene Cox (September 11, 1947 – February 17, 1990) was an American professional baseball catcher and coach. He played all or parts of nine seasons in Major League Baseball (MLB), from 1973 until 1982. Cox threw and batted right-handed, standing 5 feet 11 inches (1.80 m; 180 cm) tall, and weighing 190 pounds (86 kg; 14 st), during his playing days.

== Early life ==
Cox, a native of Ottawa, Ohio, was a 1965 graduate of Ottawa-Glandorf High School, located in Ottawa. The following year, he was signed by the Philadelphia Phillies as an amateur free agent.

== Playing career ==
After spending seven full seasons in minor league baseball in the club's farm system, Cox debuted with the Phils on April 18, 1973, appeared in one game, and was shuttled back to the minor leagues. He split the 1974–75 seasons between Philadelphia and the minors. On October 24, 1975, Cox was traded to the Minnesota Twins for Sergio Ferrer. He then spent the entire 1976 campaign back in Triple-A for the Twins, then was purchased by the Seattle Mariners. He was traded along with Willie Horton, Rick Honeycutt, Leon Roberts and Mario Mendoza from the Mariners to the Texas Rangers for Richie Zisk, Jerry Don Gleaton, Rick Auerbach, Ken Clay, Brian Allard and minor-league right-handed pitcher Steve Finch in an 11-player blockbuster deal on December 18, 1980.

Cox made the majors for five full seasons, playing for the Mariners (1977), Chicago Cubs (1978), the Mariners again (in 1979 and 1980) and Texas Rangers (1981). He returned to the Cubs briefly in May 1982 but spent most of that season as a coach in the minors. He played in 382 career major league games in his career with 182 hits in 825 at bats (a .221 batting average). He hit 12 home runs and had 85 RBI.

== Managerial and coaching career ==
Cox remained in the Cub organization as a minor league manager from 1983 to 1987, and became the bullpen coach on Don Zimmer's staff in 1988–89, including the Cubs' 1989 NL East champion team.

Cox died on February 17, 1990, of a heart attack while playing racquetball in Bellefontaine, Ohio, at the age of 42.
