= Leon Roberts =

American baseball player (born 1951)

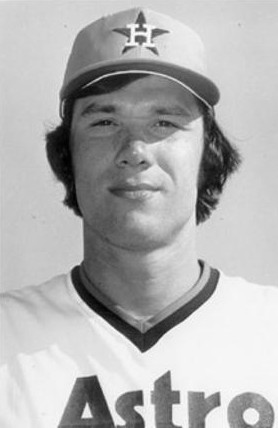
- Roberts in 1976
- Outfielder
- Born: January 22, 1951 (age 75); Vicksburg, Michigan, U.S.
- Batted: Right Threw: Right

MLB debut
- September 3, 1974, for the Detroit Tigers

Last MLB appearance
- September 30, 1984, for the Kansas City Royals

MLB statistics
- Batting average: .267
- Home runs: 78
- Runs batted in: 328
- Stats at Baseball Reference

Teams
- Detroit Tigers (1974–1975); Houston Astros (1976–1977); Seattle Mariners (1978–1980); Texas Rangers (1981–1982); Toronto Blue Jays (1982); Kansas City Royals (1983–1984)

Leon Kauffman Roberts (born January 22, 1951) is an American former corner outfielder in Major League Baseball who played from 1974 through 1984 for the Detroit Tigers, Houston Astros, Seattle Mariners, Texas Rangers, Toronto Blue Jays and Kansas City Royals. Listed at 6' 3", 200 lb., Roberts batted and threw right handed.

== Career ==
Roberts was born in Vicksburg, Michigan, and graduated from Portage Northern High School, where he played baseball, football, basketball and ran track. He attended the University of Michigan, originally recruited to play football by coach Bo Schembechler. He played three years of college baseball and college basketball for the Michigan Wolverines.

Roberts was drafted by the Detroit Tigers in the 10th round (236th overall) of the 1972 Major League Baseball draft. He made his major league debut on September 3, 1974, going 0-for-5 in a 5–4 win over the Cleveland Indians. Roberts eventually earned the dubious honor of replacing Al Kaline in right field for the Tigers.

Roberts was dealt along with Terry Humphrey, Gene Pentz and Mark Lemongello from the Tigers to the Houston Astros for Milt May, Dave Roberts and Jim Crawford on December 6, 1975. With the Mariners needing a right-handed power-hitting outfielder and the Astros more speed and infield depth, he was sent to Seattle for Jimmy Sexton two years later on December 5, 1977.

Roberts' most productive season came in 1978, when he led the Mariners with a .301 batting average (sixth in the American League), and set career-highs with 22 home runs and 92 RBI in 134 games.

On December 18, 1980, Roberts was traded along with Willie Horton, Rick Honeycutt, Mario Mendoza and Larry Cox from the Mariners to the Texas Rangers for Richie Zisk, Jerry Don Gleaton, Rick Auerbach, Ken Clay, Brian Allard and minor-league right-handed pitcher Steve Finch in an 11-player blockbuster deal.

On February 5, 1983, Roberts was traded by the Blue Jays to the Royals for a young Cecil Fielder. He also pitched one inning for Kansas City in 1984, giving up three earned runs. Roberts played his last game on September 30, 1984 against the Oakland Athletics, recording a pinch-hit RBI single in his final career at bat.

At the end of his career, it was discovered that Roberts had seriously bad eyesight due to an accident when he was a child. "I have real bad eyes," Roberts said, "I stabbed my eye with a knife when I was a kid. I was goofing around with my jackknife. I kept it hidden because I wanted to be a ballplayer. I had bad focusing point in my right eye and bad depth perception in my left eye, but I kept it secret so I wouldn’t be released. I never told anyone that I had such bad vision in my right eye, not a manager, not a teammate, not anyone. When we had our physicals in spring training there would be a long line, just like a cattle call. I would sneak up and read the line they wanted us to read and memorize it. Then when I got up there I’d just recite what I’d memorized. No one ever figured it out. I would always force myself to really concentrate on reading the ball and tracking the ball."

In an 11-season career, Roberts posted a batting average of .267 (731-for-2,737) with 78 home runs and 328 RBI in 901 games played. Following his professional playing career, he began a career managing in the Minor Leagues.

Roberts played winter ball with the Leones del Caracas club of the Venezuelan League during the 1977–1978 season.
