= Brian Allard =

American baseball player (born 1958)

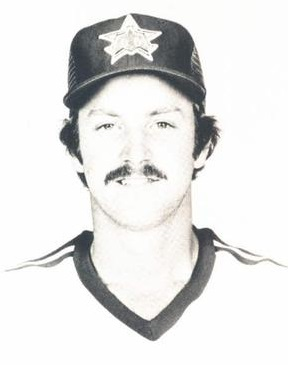
- Pitcher
- Born: January 3, 1958 (age 68); Spring Valley, Illinois, U.S.
- Batted: Right Threw: Right

MLB debut
- August 8, 1979, for the Texas Rangers

Last MLB appearance
- June 10, 1981, for the Seattle Mariners

MLB statistics
- Win–loss record: 4–6
- Earned run average: 4.23
- Strikeouts: 44
- Stats at Baseball Reference

Teams
- Texas Rangers (1979–1980); Seattle Mariners (1981)

Brian Marshall Allard (born January 3, 1958) is an American former Major League Baseball pitcher who played for the Texas Rangers (1979-1980) and Seattle Mariners (1981). His fastball was 90-95 mph. He also threw a curveball, slider, and changeup. He lives in Washington.

== Professional career ==
=== Texas Rangers ===
Allard was selected by Texas Rangers in fourth round, 84th overall, of 1976 Major League Baseball draft.

He made his debut with the Rangers on August 8, 1979 against the Detroit Tigers at the age of 21. Allard went two innings, giving up two earned runs on two hits in that game. He finished the '79 season going 1–3 in seven games, four for starts, with a 4.32 ERA.

In 1979 Allard went 0-1 for the Rangers with a 5.65 ERA in five games, two for starts.

=== Seattle Mariners ===
On December 12, 1980, Allard was traded by the Rangers along with Steve Finch, Rick Auerbach, Ken Clay, Jerry Don Gleaton and Richie Zisk to the Seattle Mariners for Larry Cox, Rick Honeycutt, Willie Horton, Mario Mendoza and Leon Roberts.

In 1981 Allard started seven games for the Mariners, including a start against the Cleveland Indians' Len Barker. Barker had thrown a perfect game in his previous start. Allard out dueled Barker, combining with relief pitcher Shawn Rawley to pitch a three-hit game.

I was pumped, I knew it would be a tough battle. You just knew [Len Barker] would pitch well.

— Brian Allard, The Spokesman-Review: May 21, 1981.

Allard went on to finish the '81 season with a 3–2 record with a 3.75 ERA in seven games, all for starts. This would be his last season at the Major League level.
