= Steve Stroughter =

American baseball player

- Designated hitter / Left fielder
- Born: March 15, 1952; Visalia, California, U.S.
- Died: March 6, 2018 (aged 65); Fresno, California, U.S.
- Batted: Left Threw: Right

Professional debut
- MLB: April 7, 1982, for the Seattle Mariners
- NPB: April 9, 1983, for the Hanshin Tigers

Last appearance
- MLB: July 24, 1982, for the Seattle Mariners
- NPB: June 18, 1983, for the Hanshin Tigers

MLB statistics
- Batting average: .170
- Home runs: 1
- Runs batted in: 3

NPB statistics
- Batting average: .276
- Home runs: 5
- Runs batted in: 12
- Stats at Baseball Reference

Teams
- Seattle Mariners (1982); Hanshin Tigers (1983)

Stephen Lewis Stroughter (March 15, 1952 – March 6, 2018) was an American Major League Baseball designated hitter/left fielder who played for the Seattle Mariners in 1982. He attended College of the Sequoias.

== Career ==
Stroughter was originally drafted by the California Angels in the 15th round of the 1970 amateur draft, but he chose not to sign. He was drafted in the 1971 secondary phase amateur draft by the Chicago Cubs, but he again did not sign. He was the sixth overall pick in the 1971 secondary phase (active) amateur draft (drafted by the San Francisco Giants), and signed. On October 24, 1975, he was purchased by the Angels from the Giants. On April 5, 1979, he was released by the Angels and on June 5, 1979, he was signed by the Mariners. On December 19, 1980, he was traded to the Twins for Mike Bacsik. On May 28, 1981, he was purchased by the Mariners.

Stroughter spent over a decade in the minors before making his big league debut on April 7, at the age of 30. Pinch-hitting for Jim Essian, Stroughter grounded out in his first big league at-bat, which was against Doug Corbett of the Minnesota Twins.

A solid minor league player who hit for average and some power, Stroughter hit only .170 in 26 big league games (47 at-bats). Perhaps the best game of his career occurred on May 4. He went 2–4 with a home run off of Dennis Martínez.

He played his final big league game on July 24, 1982. Following his big league career, he returned to the minors and also played baseball in Japan, appearing in 28 games for the Hanshin Tigers in 1983.

Stroughter died March 6, 2018.
