= Vance McHenry =

American baseball player

- Shortstop
- Born: July 10, 1956 (age 69); Chico, California
- Batted: Right Threw: Right

MLB debut
- August 13, 1981, for the Seattle Mariners

Last MLB appearance
- June 27, 1982, for the Seattle Mariners

MLB statistics
- Batting average: .211
- Home runs: 0
- Runs batted in: 2
- Stats at Baseball Reference

Teams
- Seattle Mariners (1981–1982)

Vance Loren McHenry (born July 10, 1956) is a former Major League Baseball shortstop for the Seattle Mariners. He played sparingly in two brief major league stints in 1981 and 1982, batting .211 in 18 games.

McHenry attended Chico High School in Chico, California. He played college baseball at Butte College and for the UNLV Rebels. He played in the 1978 NCAA Division I tournament with UNLV.

The Mariners selected McHenry in the 11th round of the 1978 MLB draft. He made his MLB debut in August 1981, hitting a single and getting a run batted in as a pinch hitter in his first plate appearance. In 15 games, he had a .222 batting average. He ended his major league tenure with three games in June 1982, all as a late-game defensive replacement, getting one at bat. He was called up to fill in for the injured Todd Cruz, replacing Lenny Randle on the roster. In his first game in the majors that season, McHenry made a throwing error in the 11th inning that allowed two runs to score in a loss to the Toronto Blue Jays.

Seattle traded McHenry to the Texas Rangers for pitcher Bob Babcock in January 1983. McHenry played in the minors through 1985.

McHenry was inducted into Chico's baseball hall of fame in 2007.
