= Odie Davis =

American baseball player (born 1955)

- Shortstop
- Born: August 13, 1955 (age 70); San Antonio, Texas, U.S.
- Batted: Right Threw: Right

MLB debut
- September 3, 1980, for the Texas Rangers

Last MLB appearance
- October 5, 1980, for the Texas Rangers

MLB statistics
- Batting average: .125
- Home runs: 0
- Runs batted in: 0
- Stats at Baseball Reference

Teams
- Texas Rangers (1980)

Odie Ernest Davis (born August 13, 1955) is an American former professional baseball player. He was a shortstop for one season (1980) with the Texas Rangers. For his career, he compiled a .125 batting average in 8 at-bats.

An alumnus of Prairie View A&M University, he was born in San Antonio, Texas.
