= Rick Auerbach =

American baseball player (born 1950)

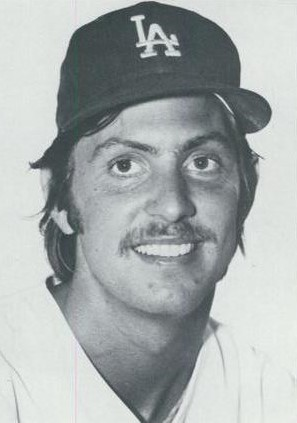
- Shortstop
- Born: February 15, 1950 (age 76); Woodland Hills, California, U.S.
- Batted: Right Threw: Right

MLB debut
- April 13, 1971, for the Milwaukee Brewers

Last MLB appearance
- August 12, 1981, for the Seattle Mariners

MLB statistics
- Batting average: .220
- Home runs: 9
- Runs batted in: 86
- Stats at Baseball Reference

Teams
- Milwaukee Brewers (1971–1973); Los Angeles Dodgers (1974–1976); Cincinnati Reds (1977–1980); Seattle Mariners (1981)

Frederick Steven Auerbach (born February 15, 1950) is an American former Major League Baseball shortstop.

== Early years ==
Auerbach was born in Woodland Hills, California, to Esther and Jack Auerbach. He was drafted by the California Angels in the 13th round of the 1968 Major League Baseball draft upon graduation from Taft High School, but chose, instead, to play college baseball at Los Angeles Pierce College in Woodland Hills. He was drafted the next year in the secondary phase of the 1969 amateur draft by the expansion Seattle Pilots.

He split his one season in the Pilots' farm system between the Pioneer League's Billings Mustangs and the Midwest League's Clinton Pilots, batting a combined .238 with four home runs and 29 runs batted in between the two.

He began the 1970 season with Clinton (now a Milwaukee Brewers affiliate). After batting .325 through the first month of the season, he made the jump all the way up to triple A, where he batted an even .300.

== Milwaukee Brewers ==
Auerbach began the 1971 season as the Brewers' starting shortstop, but lost the job following the June 1 acquisition of Bob Heise from the San Francisco Giants. With his batting average hovering below .200 all season, and more strikeouts than hits (30 to 28), he was sent down to triple A at the end of June. He returned to the majors for a brief three game stint in August, and returned for good in September, and showed modest improvement. He batted .229 for the month, and clubbed his first home run on September 24 off the Oakland Athletics' Diego Segui to lead his team to a 1–0 victory.

Auerbach played in a career high 153 games in 1972 on his way to several career highs. He split the season as the Brewers' lead-off hitter and just ahead of the pitcher in the eight hole. Batting lead-off, he batted just .198 with only 28 runs scored, but as an eighth hitter, he batted .303 with 21 RBIs. Overall, he batted .218 with two home runs and thirty RBIs.

== Los Angeles Dodgers ==
Twelve games into the 1973 season, Auerbach was dealt to the Los Angeles Dodgers for Tim Johnson. With Bill Russell firmly entrenched at the shortstop position, Auerbach spent the season in triple A with the Albuquerque Dukes. After the season, the Brewers purchased Auerbach back from the Dodgers. A month later, the Dodgers purchased Auerbach back from the Brewers.

Backing up Russell at short and Davey Lopes at second, and occasionally pinch hitting, Auerbach saw very limited playing time in 1974, but batted .342 in his limited role. He reached the postseason for the first time in his career, and got a double in his only at bat in the 1974 National League Championship Series.

An injury to Russell early in the 1975 season landed Auerbach a starting job with the Dodgers for most of the first half of the season. He was batting below .200 for much of the time Russell was gone, but managed to get his batting average up to .209 by the time Russell returned. He had just twelve at bats after that. He saw very little playing time in 1976 as well, getting six hits in 47 at bats all season.

== Cincinnati Reds ==
Just as Spring training 1977 was beginning, the Dodgers sent Auerbach to the New York Mets for pitcher Hank Webb. He appeared in 22 games for the triple A Tidewater Tides when he was the player to be named later in the deal that sent Lenny Randle to the Mets from the Texas Rangers. On June 15, 1977, his contract was sold to the Cincinnati Reds.

Auerbach saw a slightly increased role in 1978. On April 22, he hit his first home run in nearly four years, off San Francisco's Vida Blue. His second home run of the season initiated a come from behind rally against the Dodgers on July 2, yet Auerbach was batting just .167 through July. He would then go on a 12-for-19 tear that would raise his average to .327 for the season.

Following Pete Rose's departure via free agency, Auerbach saw more playing time at third base in 1979. He continued to be thorn in the side of his former franchise, but it took a personal turn during the Dodgers' May 25 17–6 mauling of the Reds. With the Dodgers already ahead 14–2, Lopes drilled a 3–0 fastball for three-run home run. Auerbach found that a clear violation of baseball's unwritten rules, and a bench-clearing brawl ensued. On June 27, he went 3-for-5 with three doubles and two RBIs in the Reds' 9–1 victory over the Dodgers.

He batted .210 with one home run and twelve RBIs for a Reds team that captured the National League West by a game and a half over the Houston Astros. Auerbach went hitless in two at bats in the 1979 National League Championship Series against the Pittsburgh Pirates.

Auerbach batted .333 in 24 games for the Reds in 1980 when his contract was purchased by the Texas Rangers on his wedding day of July 19. He never reported to his new team, and sat out the remainder of the season.

== Seattle Mariners ==
On December 12, 1980, the Rangers sent Richie Zisk, Brian Allard, Ken Clay, Jerry Don Gleaton, minor leaguer Steve Finch and a player to be named later to the Seattle Mariners for Larry Cox, Rick Honeycutt, Mario Mendoza, Leon Roberts and a player to be named later. Designated hitter Willie Horton was sent to Texas, and Auerbach went to the M's to complete the deal. Auerbach batted just .155 with one home run and six RBIs in what would be his final season.

== Retirement ==
As of 2012, Auerbach was working as a farrier. He resides in Calabasas, CA.

== Career statistics ==
Games	PA	AB	Runs	Hits	2B	3B	HR	RBI	SB	BB	SO	HBP	Avg.	Fld%
624	1567	1407	167	309	56	5	9	86	36	127	198	6	.220	.956
