= Jerry Don Gleaton =

American baseball player (born 1957)

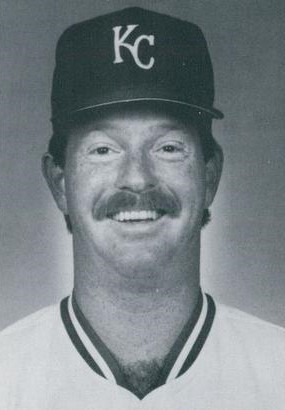
- Gleaton c. 1988 with the Kansas City Royals
- Pitcher
- Born: September 14, 1957 (age 68); Brownwood, Texas, U.S.
- Batted: Left Threw: Left

MLB debut
- July 11, 1979, for the Texas Rangers

Last MLB appearance
- July 20, 1992, for the Pittsburgh Pirates

MLB statistics
- Win–loss record: 15–23
- Earned run average: 4.25
- Strikeouts: 265
- Stats at Baseball Reference

Teams
- Texas Rangers (1979–1980); Seattle Mariners (1981–1982); Chicago White Sox (1984–1985); Kansas City Royals (1987–1989); Detroit Tigers (1990–1991); Pittsburgh Pirates (1992)

Jerry Don Gleaton (born September 14, 1957) is an American former professional baseball pitcher who played from 1979 to 1992 for the Texas Rangers, Seattle Mariners, Chicago White Sox, Kansas City Royals, Detroit Tigers, and Pittsburgh Pirates of Major League Baseball (MLB). He was a left-handed pitcher who worked mainly in relief.

Gleaton attended Brownwood High School in Brownwood, Texas. He played college baseball for the Texas Longhorns and was an All-American and the Southwest Conference player of the year in 1979.

The Rangers selected Gleaton in the first round (18th pick overall) of the 1979 MLB draft. He made his MLB debut that July, pitching in five games. He was traded, along with Richie Zisk, Rick Auerbach, Ken Clay, Brian Allard, and minor-league right-handed pitcher Steve Finch from the Rangers to the Mariners for Willie Horton, Rick Honeycutt, Leon Roberts, Mario Mendoza and Larry Cox on December 18, 1980. In the minor leagues, he led the Eastern League with 13 complete games in 1982.

Seattle traded Gleaton and pitcher Gene Nelson to the White Sox for Salomé Barojas in June 1984. Gleaton spent the 1986 season in the minors, then elected free agency. After signing with the Royals, he led the team with 48 games pitched in 1987. The Royals traded him to the Tigers for minor leaguer Chuck Everson in April 1990, and he had a career-high 13 saves with Detroit that season. He pitched in his final MLB season with Pittsburgh in 1992 before being released in July. He pitched in the San Francisco Giants and Florida Marlins minor league organizations before retiring.

Gleaton was inducted into the Texas Longhorns Hall of Fame in 1999 and the Big Country Athletic Hall of Fame in Abilene, Texas, in 2013.

Gleaton resides in Brownwood, Texas. After his playing career, he was a scout for Detroit from 1994 to 1996. He was an assistant coach for the Howard Payne University Yellow Jackets, an NCAA Division III program, through 2017. He has also been the activities director at a Brownwood church.
