= Paul Serna =

American baseball player (born 1958)

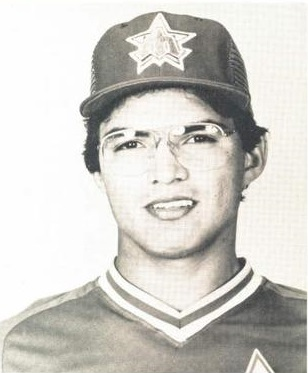
- Serna in 1981
- Infielder
- Born: November 16, 1958 (age 67); El Centro, California
- Batted: Right Threw: Right

MLB debut
- September 1, 1981, for the Seattle Mariners

Last MLB appearance
- October 3, 1982, for the Seattle Mariners

MLB statistics
- Batting average: .236
- Home runs: 7
- Runs batted in: 17
- Stats at Baseball Reference

Teams
- Seattle Mariners (1981–1982)

Paul David Serna (born November 16, 1958) is an American former professional baseball player. He played in Major League Baseball (MLB) for the Seattle Mariners in 1981 and 1982.

Serna played college baseball at Imperial Valley College and for the Azusa Pacific Cougars. He was a first-team NAIA All-American in 1979. He signed as an amateur free agent with Seattle in June 1980, and by the following September he was in the MLB. As a September call-up from the Mexican Baseball League, Serna hit in the first eight MLB games when he had a plate appearance, the longest such streak in franchise history. Playing mostly shortstop down the stretch, he batted .255 with four home runs in 30 games. He spent the whole 1982 season in Seattle as a utility infielder. He hit two home runs, including a game-winning 11th inning home run, against the Milwaukee Brewers on May 30. He was ejected from a June game against the Kansas City Royals for arguing balls and strikes, with manager Chuck Cottier subsequently tossed. In 68 games that season, Serna batted .225 with three home runs and eight runs batted in.

The following season, Serna returned to the minor leagues. He played for three more seasons but never played in the majors again. Serna retired in Apri after reporting to spring training overweight.

Following his playing career, Serna lived in Sparks, Nevada.
