= R. J. Harrison (baseball) =

American baseball executive

Robert Joseph "R. J." Harrison (born March 14, 1954, at Long Beach, California) is an American front-office executive in Major League Baseball. He was the director of amateur scouting of the Tampa Bay Rays from 2006 through 2015, and has since served the Rays as senior advisor for scouting and baseball operations. He is the son of longtime Seattle Mariners scout Bob Harrison.

R. J. Harrison is a former minor league pitcher and catcher. He stood 6 feet 7 inches (2.01 m) tall, weighed 210 pounds (95 kg), threw right-handed and batted left-handed. He graduated from Robert A. Millikan Senior High School of Long Beach in 1972 and attended Arizona State University, where he played catcher on the Sun Devils' varsity baseball team from 1973–1975.

Harrison turned professional with the St. Louis Cardinals as a catcher in 1975, but by the middle of his second season in the Redbird farm system he had converted to pitcher. In 1977 he had his finest season as a professional, winning 14 games, with a 2.45 earned run average and 16 complete games with the St. Petersburg Cardinals of the Class A Florida State League. But his pitching career was derailed by injuries. In 1978 he landed on the disabled list of the Double-A Arkansas Travelers for the last six weeks of the season, and was released by the Cardinals prior to the 1979 campaign.

After sitting out that season, he signed with the Mariners in 1980 and spent two seasons pitching for their Double-A Lynn Sailors affiliate before beginning his post-playing career as manager of the Class A Wausau Timbers in 1982. He managed in the minor leagues through 1987 for Seattle and the San Francisco Giants, winning the 1987 California League championship with the Fresno Giants, before becoming a scout. He joined the Tampa Bay organization in 1995, three years before its first MLB team played an official game.
