= Jim Maler =

American baseball player (born 1958)

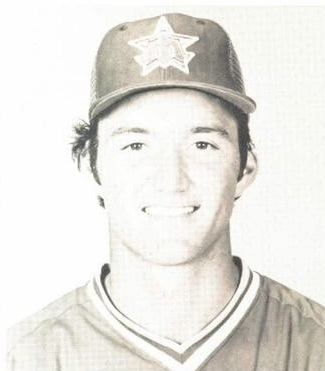
- First baseman
- Born: August 16, 1958 (age 68); New York, New York
- Batted: Right Threw: Right

MLB debut
- September 3, 1981, for the Seattle Mariners

Last MLB appearance
- July 24, 1983, for the Seattle Mariners

MLB statistics
- Batting average: .226
- Home runs: 5
- RBI: 31
- Stats at Baseball Reference

Teams
- Seattle Mariners (1981–1983)

Career highlights and awards
- Tied major league record for most assists in an inning by a first baseman

James Michael Maler (born August 16, 1958) is a former first baseman in Major League Baseball who played for the Seattle Mariners from 1981 to 1983.

He was 6 ft 4 in (1.93 m) tall and he weighed 230 pounds.

== The draft and minor league career ==
Jim Maler was the "Miami Herald Athlete Of The Year" in 1976 while playing baseball, football and basketball at Coral Gables High School. He was the University of Miami "Athlete Of The Year" in 1977 while playing baseball and football at UM. His freshman hitting streak record lasted 30 years until it was broken in 2007. Maler was taken in the first round, fifth overall, in the 1978 January Regular Phase draft by the Mariners out of Miami-Dade College (University of Miami).

Maler suffered a severe knee injury his first year in the minor leagues with Seattle, which slowed his career.

A power hitter in the minors, he hit as high as .310, hit as many as 24 home runs and drove in as many as 100 runs. Maler hit 97 home runs, 170 doubles, 27 triples and over 500 RBIs in his minor league career.

== Major league career ==
On September 3, 1981, at the age of 22, Maler made his big league debut, collecting 2 hits in 4 at-bats against the Boston Red Sox, with his first at-bat turning into a double off the "Green Monster" at Fenway Park against pitcher Tom Burgmeier. His debut game was a 19-inning contest, with the Mariners beating the Red Sox 8–7, that set the Fenway Park longest game record for innings played.

He played 12 games in the majors in 1981, hitting .348 in 23 at-bats.

In 1982, he appeared in 64 games, batting .226 in 221 at-bats. One of the highlights of his 1982 season was a grand slam he hit on May 22 off of Randy Lerch of the Milwaukee Brewers. Perhaps the best game of his career came on April 6 - his first game of the year. Maler went 3 for 4 with a home run and five RBI in an 11–7 win over the Minnesota Twins. Maler had the first single ever hit in the Hubert H. Humphrey Metrodome.

In 1983 in 66 at-bats, he hit .182. In January 1984, he was traded to the New York Mets for minor leaguer John Semprini.

It seems that, just as quickly as Maler's promising young career began, it was over. He played his final big league game on July 24, 1983. His big league career was over before his 25th birthday as he suffered another devastating knee injury in 1984 that ended his Major League career.

== Career statistics ==
Maler hit .226 in 102 major league games. In 310 at-bats, he collected 70 hits (including five home runs), drove in 31 runs, scored 24 runs, walked 19 times and struck out 47 times. He posted a .994 career fielding percentage.

== Other information ==
- Maler wore number 11 (1981) and 33 (1982 and 1983)
- Maler is one of two first basemen to hold the American League record for most assists in an inning, with three. Dick Stuart is the other AL first baseman.
