= Bud Bulling =

American baseball player (1952–2014)

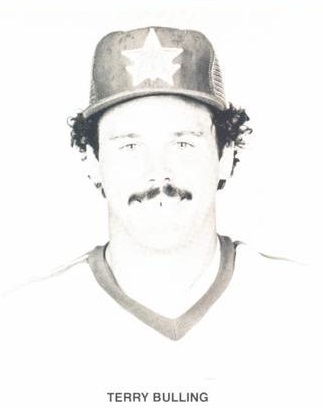
- Catcher
- Born: December 15, 1952; Lynwood, California, U.S.
- Died: March 8, 2014 (aged 61); Salem, Oregon, U.S.
- Batted: Right Threw: Right

MLB debut
- July 3, 1977, for the Minnesota Twins

Last MLB appearance
- April 14, 1983, for the Seattle Mariners

MLB statistics
- Batting average: .223
- Home runs: 3
- Runs batted in: 28
- Stats at Baseball Reference

Teams
- Minnesota Twins (1977); Seattle Mariners (1981–1983)

Terry Charles Bulling (December 15, 1952 – March 8, 2014) was a Major League Baseball catcher for the Minnesota Twins (1977) and Seattle Mariners (1981–1983).

The Twins selected Bulling in the 14th round of the 1974 MLB Draft. That year, while playing for the Wisconsin Rapids Twins, Bulling was accidentally shot in the abdomen by a teammate. The bullet lodged in his pelvic bone and he spent three days in intensive care. Bulling was a Midwest League All-Star the following two seasons. He made his MLB debut with Minnesota in 1977, called up to replace the injured Glenn Borgmann. Bulling hit .156 in 15 games.

The Mariners purchased Bulling's contract in March 1979, and he returned to the majors in 1981. In 1982, Bulling caught Gaylord Perry's 300th win. He had served as Perry's personal catcher and the team's backup.

Bulling died March 8, 2014 in Salem, Oregon. He had three children. He had been married.
