= Bob Stoddard =

American baseball player (born 1957)

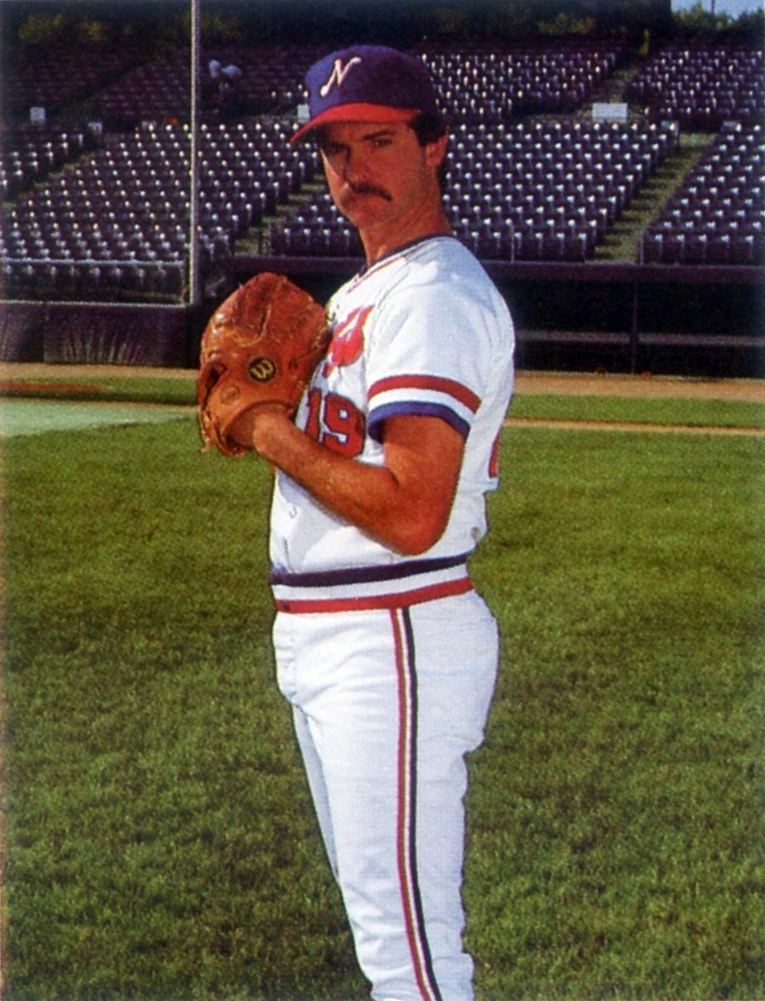
- Stoddard with the Nashville Sounds in 1985
- Pitcher
- Born: March 8, 1957 (age 69); San Jose, California, U.S.
- Batted: Right Threw: Right

MLB debut
- September 4, 1981, for the Seattle Mariners

Last MLB appearance
- September 19, 1987, for the Kansas City Royals

MLB statistics
- Win–loss record: 18–27
- Earned run average: 4.03
- Strikeouts: 223
- Stats at Baseball Reference

Teams
- Seattle Mariners (1981–1984); Detroit Tigers (1985); San Diego Padres (1986); Kansas City Royals (1987)

Robert Lyle Stoddard (born March 8, 1957) is an American former professional baseball pitcher who played for the Seattle Mariners, Detroit Tigers, San Diego Padres and Kansas City Royals of Major League Baseball (MLB). Stoddard attended Fresno State University and he threw and batted right-handed.

Stoddard, who was 6'1" and 200 (some sources say he was 190 or 210) pounds, was drafted four times. He was drafted in the 19th round of the 1975 MLB draft by the Milwaukee Brewers, in the 3rd round of the 1976 MLB draft by the Oakland Athletics. In 1976, he was drafted by the Atlanta Braves in the third round too, this time in a different draft (there are multiple drafts held each year). He was not drafted at all in 1977, and in 1978-when he was drafted by the Seattle Mariners in the 10th round-he finally decided to sign.

Stoddard had spent less than four seasons in the minor leagues when he made his MLB debut on September 4, 1981, at the age of 24. He experienced two successful seasons in 1981 and 1982, posting ERAs of 2.60 and 2.41 in each of those two seasons, respectively. In 1983, his statistics went "downhill"-his win–loss record was a mediocre 9-17. After that season, his ERA reached under 3.00 only once more. His final MLB game was September 19, 1987.
