= Manny Castillo =

Dominican baseball player (born 1957)

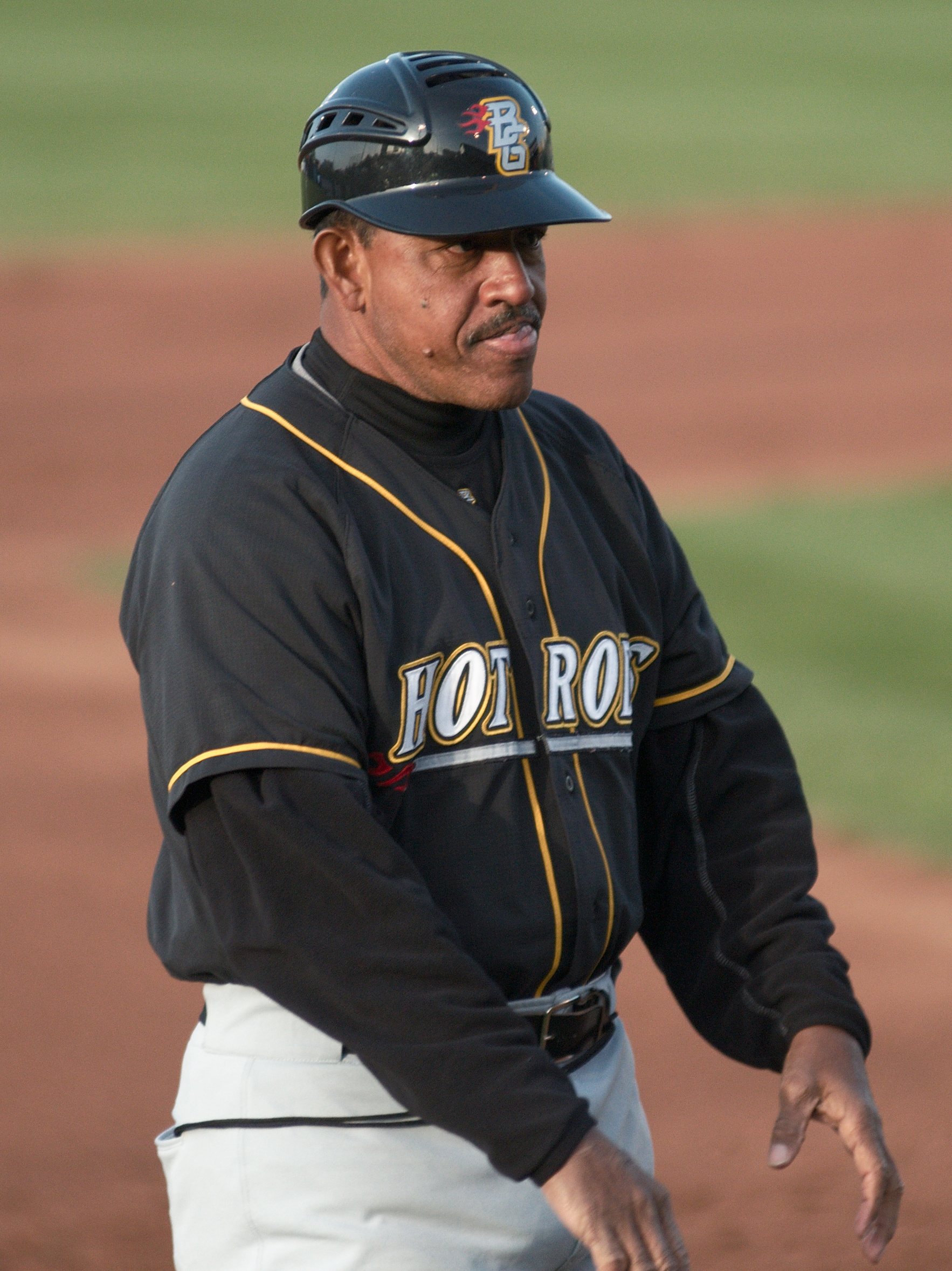
- Castillo with the Bowling Green Hot Rods in 2010
- Third baseman
- Born: April 1, 1957 (age 69); Santo Domingo, Dominican Republic
- Batted: Switch Threw: Right

MLB debut
- September 1, 1980, for the Kansas City Royals

Last MLB appearance
- October 2, 1983, for the Seattle Mariners

MLB statistics
- Batting average: .242
- Home runs: 3
- Runs batted in: 73
- Stats at Baseball Reference

Teams
- Kansas City Royals (1980); Seattle Mariners (1982–1983)

Esteban Manuel Antonio Castillo Cabrera (born April 1, 1957) is a Dominican former Major League Baseball (MLB) third baseman. Castillo played three seasons in MLB, with the Kansas City Royals in 1980 and the Seattle Mariners in 1982 and 1983. He played in 236 games in his career, with a batting average of .242 with 174 hits in 719 at-bats. He had 3 stolen bases, 3 home runs, 73 RBI, and 63 runs. He batted and threw right-handed and was 5 foot 9.

Castillo originally signed with the New York Mets in 1972. He was a September call-up with the Royals in 1980, playing in seven games. He had a 287-game consecutive games played streak in Triple-A spanning 1980 and 1981. He won the American Association Most Valuable Player Award in 1981. The Royals traded Castillo to the Mariners in October 1981, with the Mariners sending Bud Black back the following March. Castillo had been blocked in Kansas City by future Hall of Famer George Brett.

Castillo had his best season in 1982 with the Mariners, when he had 130 hits, a .257 average, and all three of his home runs. He set a franchise rookie record with 29 doubles and nine sacrifice flies. He hit his first home run on August 26 off Jack Morris of the Detroit Tigers, snapping a Seattle losing streak. The Mariners released Castillo in March 1984. He signed with the Toronto Blue Jays the following month and played in Triple-A for one season. He then played in the Mexican Baseball League from 1985 to 1988.

Castillo began coaching in with a minor league team in San Pedro de Macorís, Dominican Republic in 1989. In 1997, he became the manager of the Tampa Bay Devil Rays' Dominican Summer League affiliate. He was promoted to the American minor leagues in 2002, often serving as a hitting coach. He has coached the Florida Complex League Rays since 2021.

Castillo and his wife have six children.
