= Richie Zisk =

American baseball player (born 1949)

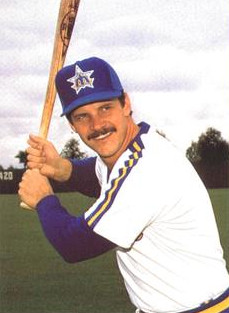
- Outfielder / Designated hitter
- Born: February 6, 1949 (age 77); Brooklyn, New York, U.S.
- Batted: Right Threw: Right

MLB debut
- September 8, 1971, for the Pittsburgh Pirates

Last MLB appearance
- September 21, 1983, for the Seattle Mariners

MLB statistics
- Batting average: .287
- Home runs: 207
- Runs batted in: 792
- Stats at Baseball Reference

Teams
- Pittsburgh Pirates (1971–1976); Chicago White Sox (1977); Texas Rangers (1978–1980); Seattle Mariners (1981–1983)

Career highlights and awards
- 2× All-Star (1977, 1978)

Richard Walter Zisk (born February 6, 1949) is an American former professional baseball player, coach and scout. He played in Major League Baseball (MLB) as an outfielder and designated hitter for the Pittsburgh Pirates, Chicago White Sox, Texas Rangers and Seattle Mariners. A two-time All-Star player, Zisk was named the American League 1981 Comeback Player of the Year. He was the first position player in major league history to sign a 10-year contract.

== Career ==
=== Pittsburgh Pirates ===
Zisk was drafted by the Pittsburgh Pirates out of Seton Hall University in the third round of the 1967 Major League Baseball draft. He made his major league debut on September 8, 1971, replacing Roberto Clemente in right field in the eighth inning of Pittsburgh's 10–1 victory over the Chicago Cubs. He got a single in his first major league at-bat. Zisk also appeared in 17 games with the 1972 Pirates, however, he was not on either team's postseason roster.

In Zisk's rookie season, 1973, he batted .324 with 10 home runs and 54 RBI in 103 games. On June 9, 1974, he hit for the cycle in a 14–1 victory over the San Francisco Giants at Candlestick Park. For the season, he hit .313 with 17 home runs and a team-high 100 RBI in 149 games. He made his only postseason appearances with the 1974 and 1975 Pirates. While batting an impressive .400 in the postseason, Zisk only scored one run and had no RBI as the Pirates lost in four games to the Dodgers in the 1974 National League Championship Series (NLCS) and were swept by the Reds in the 1975 NLCS.

=== Chicago White Sox ===
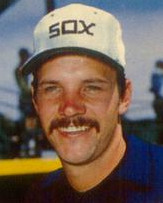
Zisk with 1977 White Sox

Zisk was acquired along with Silvio Martinez by the Chicago White Sox from the Pirates for Goose Gossage and Terry Forster at the Winter Meetings on December 10, 1976. His best season was in 1977, his lone year with the White Sox, when he hit 30 home runs and had 101 RBI, both career highs, in addition to a .290 batting average in 141 games. He started in left field for the American League in the 1977 All-Star Game, going 2-for-3 with a double and two RBIs. Zisk became a free agent at the end of the 1977 season.

=== Texas Rangers ===
On November 9, 1977, he signed a 10-year, $2.75 million contract with the Texas Rangers. This made him the first major league position player to sign a 10-year contract. He batted clean-up and started in right field at the 1978 All-Star Game in San Diego. For the season, Zisk batted .262 with 22 home runs and 85 RBI in 140 games while splitting time between left field, right field, and designated hitter.

=== Seattle Mariners ===
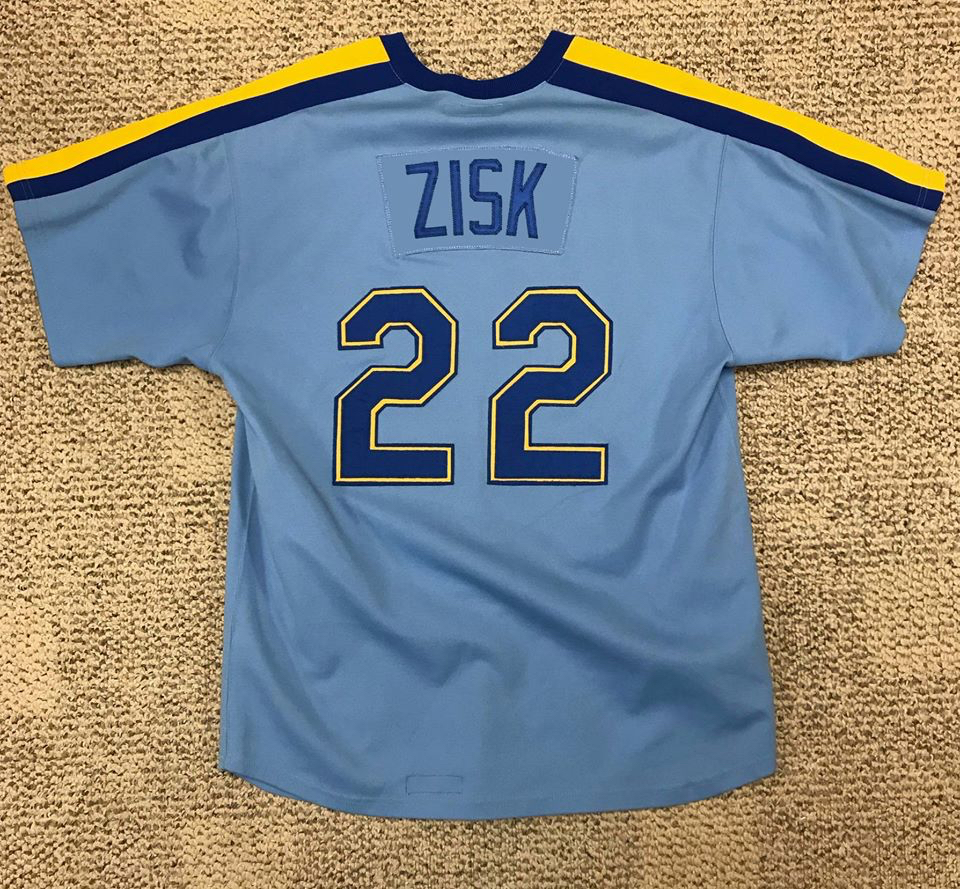
1983 Seattle Mariners #22 Richie Zisk road jersey

After three seasons in Texas, the Rangers traded Zisk along with Jerry Don Gleaton, Rick Auerbach, Ken Clay, Brian Allard and minor-league right-handed pitcher Steve Finch to the Seattle Mariners for Willie Horton, Rick Honeycutt, Leon Roberts, Mario Mendoza, and Larry Cox in an 11-player blockbuster deal on December 18, 1980. In Zisk's first season in Seattle, he batted .311 with 16 home runs and 43 RBI in 94 games to earn the Sporting News 1981 AL Comeback Player of the Year honors. After three seasons as the Mariners' designated hitter, he retired after the 1983 season.

=== Career stats ===
Seasons	Games	AB	Runs	Hits	2B	3B	HR	RBI	SB	BB	SO	HBP	Avg.	Slg.	OBP	TB	FLD%
13	1,453	5,144	681	1,477	245	26	207	792	8	533	910	12	.287	.466	.353	2395	.981

== Post-playing career ==
Zisk worked in the Chicago Cubs organization after retiring. In 1987, he was a minor league hitting instructor, serving as the coordinator of instruction from 1989 to 1992. In 1995, he became the Daytona Cubs hitting coach. In 2002 and 2003, he was a roving minor league hitting instructor. In 2005, he managed Daytona. From 2006 to 2010, he returned to the hitting coach role with Daytona. The Daytona Cubs retired Richie's number 22 in 2007 on his bobblehead day. In 2011 and 2012, Zisk was in charge of pro scouting in Florida for the Chicago Cubs.

Zisk was inducted into the Florida State League Hall of Fame in 2014.

== Personal life ==
Zisk was raised in Parsippany–Troy Hills, New Jersey, and played baseball at Parsippany High School. His younger brother, John, played a season in the Texas Rangers' organization and two for the independent Wausau Timbers of the Midwest League.

Zisk and his wife have three children.

In 2004, Zisk was inducted into the National Polish-American Sports Hall of Fame.

== See also ==
- List of Major League Baseball players to hit for the cycle

Achievements
Preceded by Joe Torre	Hitting for the cycle June 9, 1974	Succeeded by Lou Brock
