= Ken Clay =

American baseball player (1954–2026)

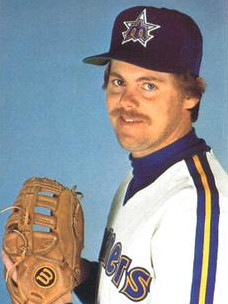
- Clay in 1981
- Pitcher
- Born: April 6, 1954; Lynchburg, Virginia, U.S.
- Died: March 26, 2026 (aged 71); Lynchburg, Virginia, U.S.
- Batted: Right Threw: Right

MLB debut
- June 7, 1977, for the New York Yankees

Last MLB appearance
- October 2, 1981, for the Seattle Mariners

MLB statistics
- Win–loss record: 10–24
- Earned run average: 4.68
- Strikeouts: 129
- Stats at Baseball Reference

Teams
- New York Yankees (1977–1979); Texas Rangers (1980); Seattle Mariners (1981)

Career highlights and awards
- 2× World Series champion (1977, 1978)

Kenneth Earl Clay (April 6, 1954 – March 26, 2026) was an American professional baseball right-handed pitcher. He played in Major League Baseball (MLB) for the New York Yankees (1977-1979), Texas Rangers (1980), and Seattle Mariners (1981), winning back-to-back World Series titles with the Yankees in 1977 and 1978, both over the Los Angeles Dodgers. He was born in Lynchburg, Virginia.

Drafted by the Yankees in the second round of the 1972 MLB draft, Clay soon emerged as one of the top pitching prospects in the Yankee organization. However, he never lived up to his potential, and was eventually traded away after three seasons in which he went 6–14 with a 4.72 earned run average.

Following his major league career, Clay had several run-ins with the law, including serving five years in jail for grand theft for creating a fake sales order at the copy machine office where he worked.

== Minor leagues ==
Clay was drafted in the second round of the 1972 draft upon graduation from E. C. Glass High School in Lynchburg, Virginia. He put up respectable numbers in his first five seasons in the Yankees' farm system, going 46–40 with a 3.64 ERA, but had a control problem. walking 348 batters over 726 innings pitched. He got it together in 1977; in ten starts with the International League's Syracuse Chiefs, Clay went 5–1 with a 1.68 ERA. He was called up by the Yankees in early June to relieve some of the burden on manager Billy Martin's overextended pitching staff.

== New York Yankees ==
Clay joined a team that was tied for first place in the American League East, and eventually won the division by 2.5 games over the Baltimore Orioles and Boston Red Sox. He went 0–2 with a 7.73 as a starter, but was far more effective out of the bullpen, compiling a 2–1 record with a 3.40 ERA and one save as a relief pitcher. Oddly, the one loss may have been his best pitching performance of the season. On June 17, the Yankees' starting pitcher, Catfish Hunter, gave up four first-inning home runs against the Red Sox at Fenway Park. Manager Billy Martin handed the ball to Clay with the team down 4–0 with two outs in the first. Clay held Boston scoreless through the fourth, allowing the Yankees to tie the score. However, the Red Sox scored a run in the fifth to hang the loss on Clay. After not making an appearance in the American League Championship Series against the Kansas City Royals, he appeared in both games the Yankees lost to the Los Angeles Dodgers in the World Series, pitching very effectively in Game 2. Nonetheless, the Yankees defeated the Dodgers in six games, earning him a world championship ring.

Heading into spring training of the 1978 season, Clay was one of the top young pitching prospects hoping to earn a spot on the Yankees' Opening Day roster, along with Jim Beattie and Gil Patterson. Each vocalized frustration with the organization when, after the 1977 season, the Yankees acquired the contract of pitcher Andy Messersmith and signed relief pitchers Goose Gossage and Rawly Eastwick as free agents, believing that the acquisitions hindered their chances of making the club. In return, Clay received his fair share of criticism from some of the veteran pitchers with the Yankees. Hunter surmised that Clay had a "great arm, great slider, bad brains", and felt that the advice he offered to the young pitcher often went unheeded. Likewise, reliever Sparky Lyle, who had won the American League Cy Young Award in 1977, also offered advice to Clay about his tendency to wear his arm out in practice and thus not being at full strength for the day's game. Team owner George Steinbrenner simply described Clay as a "morning glory", a horse racing term for a horse that performs best in the morning workouts prior to the actual race.

Regardless, with the exception of a 21-day trip to the disabled list, Clay remained on the major league roster the entire season. Clay went 3–4 with a 4.28 ERA during the regular season, but his most memorable performance came in the post-season. The Yankees were leading 4-0 when Clay was called into the first game of the American League Championship Series against the Royals in the sixth inning with one out and the bases loaded. Kansas City scored one run on a sacrifice fly by Hal McRae, but Clay then retired Al Cowens on a ground out to get out of the inning with just one run scored. He held the Royals hitless the rest of the way to earn the save; no pitcher would have a hitless postseason save as long as his until Brad Peacock in 2017. The Yankees defeated the Royals in four games and then downed the Dodgers in six games in the World Series, just as they had the previous year, giving Clay a second world championship to his name.

Unfortunately, Clay's success did not carry into the 1979 season. He went 1–7 with a 5.70 ERA, and was relegated to "mop-up duty" by the end of the season (26 of his 32 appearances were in losses). He began the 1980 season assigned to the Yankees' Triple-A affiliate, the Columbus Clippers. On August 14, he was traded to the Texas Rangers for future Hall of Famer Gaylord Perry.

== Later career ==
Clay stepped into Perry's spot in the Rangers' starting rotation, and went 2–3 with a 4.60 ERA in his only season in Texas. He was part of a blockbuster deal during the winter meetings when he, Richie Zisk, Brian Allard, Rick Auerbach, Jerry Don Gleaton, and minor leaguer Steve Finch were sent to the Seattle Mariners for Larry Cox, Rick Honeycutt, Willie Horton, Mario Mendoza, and Leon Roberts.

He began the 1981 season in Seattle's starting rotation, but after going 0–3 with an ERA of 7.03, Mariners manager Maury Wills moved him to the bullpen. He remained in the bullpen through the first half of the strike-shortened season, even after Wills was replaced by Rene Lachemann, but was then moved back into the starting rotation when play resumed after the strike. He performed far better, going 2–3 with a 3.64 ERA in ten starts. However, Clay failed to make the club the following spring and retired rather than trying to latch on with a new team. In 1989, he joined the Senior Professional Baseball Association as a member of the Gold Coast Suns but never appeared in a game with the team.

== Legal issues ==
Clay's legal troubles began in 1986. He faced up to 20 years in prison on four counts of grand larceny for stealing more than $16,000 from Jostens Inc., a school ring company for whom he worked. Campbell County, Virginia prosecutors cut a deal with his attorneys that kept him out of prison. Instead, he paid $15,000 restitution to Jostens plus $1,394.64 in court fees, got 1,000 hours of community service, five years supervised probation, and a suspended sentence.

In February 1992, Clay stole a car from the Bedford County, Virginia car dealership he worked for, and was sentenced to a year in jail. While serving his time, it was discovered that Clay withheld information about three previous arrests (the grand larceny and two DUIs) from his probation officers. As a result, an additional three years in the Campbell County jail were added onto his sentence.

Clay moved to Bradenton, Florida after his release and in 1999 was accused of identity theft. He used his girlfriend's identity to falsify credit card applications, to lease and insure a 1998 Nissan Pathfinder, and to create a checking account from which he forged checks. He was charged with five counts of forgery, five counts of scheming to defraud, nine counts of uttering a forged instrument, and four counts of grand theft, and could have been sentenced to more than 20 years in prison had a jury convicted him on all charges. Clay agreed to pay back creditors more than $40,0000, and Manatee County Circuit Judge Charles Williams sentenced him to 15 years of probation.

In 2005, Clay began working for the Copy Concept copy machine company. Having only made one sale a month and a half into his employment with the company, he falsified a sales order for a Toshiba e-Studio 3511 copier that would have landed him a $7,500 commission. He forged the supposed buyer's signature on three documents. A jury convicted him of grand theft after a one-day trial. He had been offered a plea agreement that included six months in the county jail before the trial, but did not accept it. Though prosecutors recommended a prison sentence of three years, Circuit Judge Rick De Furia sentenced him to five years in prison, citing his past criminal activity. He was released from prison on February 16, 2012, and returned to his hometown of Lynchburg, Virginia.

== Death ==
Clay died from heart and kidney problems at his Lynchburg home on March 26, 2026, at the age of 71.
