= Bob Babcock (baseball) =

American baseball player (born 1949)

- Pitcher
- Born: August 25, 1949 (age 76); New Castle, Pennsylvania, U.S.
- Batted: Right Threw: Right

MLB debut
- July 22, 1979, for the Texas Rangers

Last MLB appearance
- June 11, 1981, for the Texas Rangers

MLB statistics
- Win–loss record: 2–3
- Earned run average: 3.92
- Strikeouts: 39
- Stats at Baseball Reference

Teams
- Texas Rangers (1979–1981)

Robert Ernest Babcock (born August 25, 1949) is an American former Major League Baseball pitcher who played for three seasons. He was originally signed by the Pittsburgh Pirates in 1967, and played for the Texas Rangers from 1979 to 1981.
