= Dave Edler =

American baseball player and politician (born 1956)

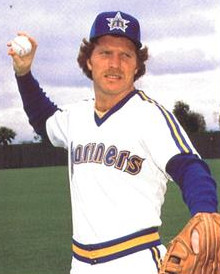
- Edler in 1981
- Third baseman
- Born: August 5, 1956 (age 70); Sioux City, Iowa, U.S.
- Batted: Right Threw: Right

MLB debut
- September 4, 1980, for the Seattle Mariners

Last MLB appearance
- June 9, 1983, for the Seattle Mariners

MLB statistics
- Batting average: .216
- Home runs: 6
- Runs batted in: 36
- Stats at Baseball Reference

Teams
- Seattle Mariners (1980–1983)

David Delmar Edler (born August 5, 1956) is an American former Major League Baseball (MLB) player. He played third base for the Seattle Mariners from 1980–1983.

== Playing career ==
Edler attended Eisenhower High School in Yakima, Washington. He pitched in the 1975 American Legion World Series for his Yakima team and was named the American Legion player of the year. He then attended Washington State University, where he played college baseball for the Cougars from 1976–1978. He was a third-team All-American at third base.

The Mariners selected him in the 21st round (520th overall) of the 1978 MLB draft. He was named the MVP of the San Jose Missions and the best defensive third baseman in the California League in 1979. In 1980, he was a Pacific Coast League All-Star with the Spokane Indians. On September 4, he made his major league debut for the Mariners on against the Boston Red Sox, batting 0-for-4 in Seattle's 7–4 win. He hit an 11th inning walk-off double against the Texas Rangers on September 25.

Edler spent time in Triple-A during all four seasons he played with the Mariners. He set several career highs in MLB in 1982, playing in 40 games, batting .279 with 18 runs batted in and 4 stolen bases. He made a throwing error that allowed the winning run to score in a loss to the Boston Red Sox in April 1983. The Mariners released him in March 1984.

== Post-playing career ==
Edler used alcohol and drugs during his playing career, quitting after his stint with the Mariners.

After his playing career, Edler served as a Yakima city council member from 2003 to 2006, and as ceremonial mayor of Yakima from 2006 to 2010. He also worked as an evangelical Christian pastor for 24 years.

On November 9, 2026, Edler and his wife were struck head on while driving by an intoxicated driver. Edler was seriously injured and airflighted to Harborview Medical Center. His wife, Susie, was pronounced dead at Multicare Memorial Hospital.

Edler has three children.

== See also ==
- List of mayors of Yakima, Washington
