= Wausau Timbers =

- 1975–1990; Wausau, Wisconsin

Minor league affiliations
- Class: Class A (1975–1990)
- League: Midwest League (1975–1990)

Major league affiliations
- Team: Baltimore Orioles (1990); Seattle Mariners (1981–1989); Co-op (1979–1980); New York Mets (1975–1978)

Minor league titles
- League titles (1): 1981

Team data
- Name: Wausau Timbers (1979–1990); Wausau Mets (1975–1978)
- Colors: Royal blue, gold, white (1981–1989); Orange, black, white (1990)
- Ballpark: Athletic Park
- Owner(s)/ Operator(s): Timbers Baseball, Inc.

The Wausau Timbers were a minor league baseball team, located in Wausau, Wisconsin. The Timbers were members of the Class A Midwest League from 1975 to 1990. The franchise was sold in 1991 and moved to Geneva, Illinois, where it became the Kane County Cougars.

== History ==
The franchise first played 1975 in Wausau as the Wausau Mets. The club maintained an affiliation with the New York Mets through 1978. Without an affiliation the team changed its name to the Timbers and played two years as a co-op with players mainly from the Cleveland Indians, Texas Rangers, and Seattle Mariners. In 1981 the club signed a player development contract with the Mariners. The affiliation with the Mariners lasted nine seasons. In 1990 the club signed on with the Baltimore Orioles and played their final season in Wausau.

== The Ballpark ==
The Timbers played at Athletic Park, 324 E. Wausau Ave. Wausau, Wisconsin Built in 1936, Athletic Park was home to the Timbers of the Class-A Midwest League (1975–1990) and previous minor league teams: the Wausau Lumberjacks (1936–1942, 1946–1949, 1956–57) and the Wausau Timberjacks (1950–1953).

The ballpark has hosted the Wausau Woodchucks of the summer collegiate Northwoods League, beginning in 1994.

== Notable alumni ==
=== Baseball Hall of Fame alumni ===
- Edgar Martínez (1984) Inducted 2019

=== Notable alumni ===
- Manny Alexander (1990)
- Neil Allen (1976)
- Juan Berenguer (1975)
- Damon Buford (1990)
- Ivan Calderon (1981–1982) MLB All-Star
- Chuck Carr (1988) 1993 NL stolen base leader
- Roy Lee Jackson (1975)
- Bill Monbouquette (1976, MGR) 4× MLB All-Star
- Ed Nunez (1980–1981)
- Jim Presley (1980–1981) MLB All-Star
- Harold Reynolds (1981) 2× MLB All-Star; 1987 AL stolen base leader
- Alex Trevino (1977)
- Omar Vizquel (1986) 11× Gold Glove; 3× MLB All-Star
- Mookie Wilson (1977) MLB All-Star
- Ned Yost (1975) Manager, 2015 World Series champion - Kansas City Royals
- Gregg Zaun (1990)

== Record ==
Year	Record	Finish	Manager	Playoffs
1975	51-77	8th	Owen Friend	
1976	56-73	8th (t)	Bill Monbouquette	
1977	55-83	7th	Tom Egan	
1978	55-81	6th	Dan Monzon	
1979	69-61	4th	Tom Robson	Lost in 1st round
1980	57-82	8th	Marty Martínez	
1981	84-48	1st	Bill Plummer	League Champs
1982	55-84	12th	R. J. Harrison	
1983	55-83	11th	R. J. Harrison	
1984	70-66	5th	Greg Mahlberg	
1985	52-85	11th	Greg Mahlberg	
1986	73-66	5th	Bobby Cuellar	
1987	57-83	11th	Bobby Cuellar	
1988	52-88	11th	Rick Sweet	
1989	66-68	8th	Tommy Jones	
1990	49-87	14th	Mike Young	
