= Vance (surname) =

- Pronunciation: UK: /ˈvæn(t)s, ˈvɑːn(t)s/ US: /ˈvæn(t)s/
- Language: English

Origin
- Language: Old English
- Origin: fenn
- Meaning: '(from the) marsh'

Other names
- Related names: Fann, Van, Vann, Vanne, Vanns

Vance is an English surname. Notable people with the surname include:

== People ==
- Ada Reedy Vance (c. 1840–after 1896), American poet
- Adam Vance (fl. 2022), American politician
- Alfred Vance (1839–1888), English music hall singer and songwriter
- Andrew Vance (1815–1862), Irish barrister and government official
- Ashlee Vance (born 1977), American writer
- Bob Vance (cricketer) (1924–1994), New Zealand cricketer and cricket administrator
- Bob Vance (jurist) (born 1961), American circuit judge
- Boyd Vance (1957–2005), American actor, director, and producer
- Calvin B. Vance (1842–1926), American politician
- Carol Vance (born 1933), American lawyer
- Chris Vance (actor) (born 1971), English actor
- Chris Vance (politician) (born 1962), American politician
- Clarice Vance (1871–1961), American vaudeville performer
- Colin Vance (1929–2018), Australian rules footballer
- Colm Vance (born 1992), Canadian soccer player
- Columbus Vance (1902–1982), American baseball pitcher
- Cory Vance (1979), American baseball pitcher
- Courtney B. Vance (born 1960), American actor
- Curtis Vance (fl. 2008–2011), American murderer
- Cyrus Vance (1917–2002), United States Secretary of State
- Cyrus Vance Jr. (born 1954), New York County District Attorney
- Danitra Vance (1954–1994), American comedian and actress
- David Vance (politician) (1836–1912), American shipmaster and politician
- David Vance (soldier) (c. 1745–1813), American soldier in the Revolutionary War
- David R. Vance (born 1940), American racehorse trainer
- Dazzy Vance (1891–1961), American baseball pitcher
- Demi Vance (born 1991), Northern Irish footballer
- Dennis Vance (1924–1983), British television producer, director, and occasional actor
- Dick Vance (1915–1985), American jazz trumpeter and arranger
- Donald Vance (born c. 1976), American Navy veteran
- "Aunt Susan" born Edna Vance (1893–1972), American journalist and radio personality
- Edward Vance (born 1957), American architect
- Elijah Vance (1801–1871), American politician
- Eric Vance (born 1975), American gridiron football defensive back
- Florence Steele Martin Vance (1840–1924), American diarist and letter writer
- Forest Vance (born 1981), American gridiron football offensive guard
- Foy Vance (born 1974), Irish musician
- Gene Vance (1923–2012), American basketball player
- Gene Arden Vance Jr. (1963–2002), American staff sergeant killed in action
- George Vance (1828–1910), Dean of Melbourne
- Gordon Vance (1951–2024), American politician
- Greedy Vance Jr. (born 2001), American football player
- Harold Sines Vance (1889–1959), American automobile company executive and government official
- Harriett Newell Espy Vance (1832–1878), First Lady of North Carolina
- Jack Vance (1916–2013), American fantasy and science fiction writer
- Jack Vance (general) (1933–2013), Canadian lieutenant-general
- James E. Vance Jr. (1925–1999), American geographer
- James Vance (comics) (1953–2017), American author and playwright
- James Vance (footballer) (1877–after 1897), Scottish inside left
- Janetta Vance (1855–1921), British archer
- Jamil Rahmat Vance (fl. 2010s), Pakistan Army major general
- JD Vance (born 1984), 50th and current Vice President of the United States
- Jean Vance (fl. 1987), British-Canadian biochemist
- Jeffrey Vance (born 1970), American film historian
- Jim Vance (1942–2017), American news anchor
- Jody Vance (born 1967), Canadian sports anchor
- Joe Vance (1905–1978), American baseball pitcher
- Joyce Vance (born 1960), American lawyer
- John Vance (MP) (died 1875), Member of Parliament for Dublin and Armagh
- John L. Vance (1839–1921), American politician
- Joseph McArthur Vance (1868–1948), American architect
- Joseph Vance (Ohio politician) (1786–1852), governor of Ohio
- Joseph Vance (priest), Anglican priest in Ireland
- Joseph W. Vance (1841–1927), American military officer
- Joseph Williams Vance Jr. (1918–1942), American naval officer in World War II
- Jonathan Vance (born 1964), Canadian general
- Judy Vance (fl. 1973–2019), American mechanical engineer
- Kenny Vance (born 1943), American singer, songwriter, and music producer
- Kenneth Vance (fl. 2022), American politician
- Leon Vance (1916–1944), American Air Force officer, US Medal of Honor recipient
- Lesley Vance (artist) (born 1977), American artist
- Lesley Vance (politician) (1939–2015), American politician
- Louis Joseph Vance (1879–1933), American novelist, screenwriter and film producer
- Margaret Shelley Vance (1925–2008), American composer
- Marilyn Vance (fl. 1980), American costume designer, and filmmaker
- Mira Margaret Baird Vance (1802–1878) American socialite, farmer, and slave owner
- Murray Vance (born 1980), Australian rules footballer
- Nate Vance (born 1978), Marine Corps veteran, cousin of JD Vance
- Nina Vance (1914–1980), American artistic director
- Pat Vance (born 1936), American politician
- Patricia Vance (fl. 2002), president of the Entertainment Software Rating Board
- Paul Vance (1929–2022), American songwriter
- Preston Vance (born 1992), American professional wrestler
- Phil Vance (born 1962), British motorcyclist
- Ralph Vance (1869–1954), American politician from Nebraska
- Robert Vance (cricketer) (born 1955), New Zealand cricketer
- Robert B. Vance (1828–1899), American politician
- Robert Brank Vance, (1793–1827), American politician
- Robert C. Vance (1894–1959), American newspaper publisher and philanthropist
- Robert J. Vance (1854–1902), American politician
- Robert Smith Vance (1931–1989), American federal judge
- Roy N. Vance (1921–2007), American judge
- Rupert Vance (1899–1975), American sociologist, demographer, and academic
- Sallie Ada Vance (born c. 1840), American poet
- Samuel Vance (sport shooter) (1879–1947), Canadian sport shooter
- Samuel B. H. Vance (1814–1890), American politician
- Sandy Vance (born 1947), American baseball pitcher
- Sarah L. Vance (born 1979), American politician
- Sarah S. Vance (born 1950), American judge
- Schuster Vance (1960–2007), American actor
- Shaquille Vance (born 1991), American Paralympic sprinter and shot putter
- Sheldon B. Vance (1917–1995), American diplomat
- Shelley Vance (fl. 2022), American politician
- Simon Vance (born 1955), American audiobook narrator
- Terry Vance (born 1953), American motorcycle racer, team owner, and parts manufacturer
- Tommy Vance (1941–2005), British radio broadcaster
- Usha Vance (born 1986), American attorney
- Van Vance (fl. 1957–2003), American sports broadcaster and announcer
- Venus Vance (died c. 1850), American slave
- Virginia Vance (1902–1942), American actress
- Vivian Vance (1909–1979), American actor and singer, known for playing Ethel on I Love Lucy
- William R. Vance (1806–1885), American mayor
- Wilson Vance (1845–1911), American soldier
- Zebulon Vance (1830–1894), Governor of North Carolina, United States senator and Confederate officer

== Pseudonym ==
- Ethel Vance, pseudonym of Grace Zaring Stone (1891–1981), American author
- Vince Vance, stage name of Andy Stone, frontman of the band Vince Vance & the Valiants
- William Vance, pen name of William van Cutsem (1935–2018), Belgian comic book artist

== Fictional characters ==
- Alyx Vance, in the video game Half-Life 2
- Bagger Vance, in the movie Legend of Bagger Vance
- Brother Vance, a character in the game Destiny and its sequel Destiny 2
- Bob Vance, character from the U.S. TV series The Office
- Deborah Vance, character from the U.S. TV series Hacks
- Dr. Eli Vance, in the video game Half-Life 2
- Lance Vance, from the video game Grand Theft Auto: Vice City
- Leon Vance, agency director in the television show NCIS
- Mary Vance, orphan from L. M. Montgomery's Rainbow Valley
- Nell Vance, in the movie The Haunting
- Philo Vance, detective in several novels by S. S. Van Dine
- Victor Vance, from the video game Grand Theft Auto: Vice City

== See also ==
- Vance (given name)

== Bibliography ==
- Reaney, P. H.; Wilson, R. M. A Dictionary of English Surnames (3 ed.). London: Routledge. ISBN 0-415-05737-X.
