= Vance =

Vance may refer to:

== People and fictional characters ==
- Vance (surname), a list of people, pseudonyms and fictional characters
  - JD Vance, vice president of the United States since 2025
- Vance (given name), a list of people, ring names and fictional characters

== Locations ==
=== United States ===
- Vance, Alabama, a town
- Vance Township, Vermilion County, Illinois
- Vance, Mississippi, an unincorporated community
- Vance, Nebraska, an unincorporated community
- Vance County, North Carolina
- Vance, South Carolina, a town
- Vance, Virginia, an unincorporated community
- Vance, West Virginia, an unincorporated community
- Vance Air Force Base, Enid, Oklahoma

=== Elsewhere ===
- Vancé, a commune of the Sarthe département in France
- Mount Vance, Marie Byrd Land, Antarctica
- Vance Bluff, Oates Land, Antarctica
- Vance Seamounts, seven seamounts (submarine volcanoes) in the Pacific Ocean
- Vance Industrial Estate, an industrial subdivision in Leeton, New South Wales, Australia

== Other uses ==
- Cyclone Vance, a 1999 severe tropical cyclone
- Hurricane Vance, in the 1990 Pacific hurricane season
- USS Vance (DE-387), a World War II destroyer escort
- Vance International Airways, a defunct American airline
- Vance High School, Charlotte, North Carolina
- Vance Cemetery, Weaverville, North Carolina
