= Joseph Vance =

Joseph Vance may refer to:

- Joseph Vance (Ohio politician) (1786–1852), governor of Ohio
- Joseph W. Vance (1841–1927), American soldier and Adjutant General of Illinois
- Joseph Williams Vance Jr. (1918–1942), officer in the United States Navy
- Joseph McArthur Vance (1868–1948), American architect
- Joseph Vance (priest), Anglican priest in Ireland
