= 1980 in baseball =

The following are the baseball events of the year 1980 throughout the world.

== Champions ==
=== Major League Baseball ===
World Series: Philadelphia Phillies over Kansas City Royals (4–2); Mike Schmidt, MVP

League Championship Series (ALCS, NLCS)
East | NY Yankees | 0
West | Kansas City | 3
East | Philadelphia | 3
West | Houston | 2

World Series
AL | Kansas City | 2
NL | Philadelphia | 4

- American League Championship Series: Frank White, MVP
- National League Championship Series Manny Trillo, MVP
- All-Star Game, July 8 at Dodger Stadium: National League, 4–2; Ken Griffey, MVP

=== Other champions ===
- Amateur World Series: Cuba
- College World Series: Arizona
- Japan Series: Hiroshima Toyo Carp over Kintetsu Buffaloes (4–3)
- Big League World Series: Buena Park, California
- Little League World Series: Long Kuong, Hua Lian, Taiwan
- Senior League World Series: Pingtung, Taiwan

Winter Leagues

- 1980 Caribbean Series: Tigres del Licey
- Dominican Republic League: Tigres del Licey
- Mexican Pacific League: Naranjeros de Hermosillo
- Puerto Rican League: Vaqueros de Bayamón
- Venezuelan League: Leones del Caracas

== Awards and honors ==
- Baseball Hall of Fame
  - Al Kaline
  - Chuck Klein
  - Duke Snider
  - Tom Yawkey (executive)

Baseball Writers' Association of America Awards
| BBWAA Award | National League | American League |
|---|---|---|
| Rookie of the Year | Steve Howe (LAD) | Joe Charbonneau (CLE) |
| Cy Young Award | Steve Carlton (PHI) | Steve Stone (BAL) |
| Most Valuable Player | Mike Schmidt (PHI) | George Brett (KC) |
| Babe Ruth Award (World Series MVP) | Tug McGraw (PHI) | — |
Gold Glove Awards
| Position | National League | American League |
| Pitcher | Phil Niekro (ATL) | Mike Norris (OAK) |
| Catcher | Gary Carter (MON) | Jim Sundberg (TEX) |
| First Baseman | Keith Hernandez (STL) | Cecil Cooper (MIL) |
| Second Baseman | Doug Flynn (NYM) | Frank White (KC) |
| Third Baseman | Mike Schmidt (PHI) | Buddy Bell (TEX) |
| Shortstop | Ozzie Smith (STL) | Alan Trammell (DET) |
| Outfielders | Andre Dawson (MON) | Fred Lynn (BOS) |
| Outfielders | Garry Maddox (PHI) | Dwayne Murphy (OAK) |
| Outfielders | Dave Winfield (SD) | Willie Wilson (KC) |

- Woman Executive of the Year (major or minor league)
  - Frances Crockett, Charlotte Orioles, Southern League

== Statistical leaders ==
| | American League | | National League | |
| Stat | Player | Total | Player | Total |
|---|---|---|---|---|
| AVG | George Brett (KC) | .390 | Bill Buckner (CHC) | .324 |
| HR | Reggie Jackson (NYY); Ben Oglivie (MIL) | 41 | Mike Schmidt (PHI) | 48 |
| RBI | Cecil Cooper (MIL) | 122 | Mike Schmidt (PHI) | 121 |
| W | Steve Stone (BAL) | 25 | Steve Carlton (PHI) | 24 |
| ERA | Rudy May (NYY) | 2.46 | Don Sutton (LAD) | 2.20 |
| K | Len Barker (CLE) | 187 | Steve Carlton (PHI) | 286 |

== Major league baseball final standings ==
=== American League final standings ===
AL East
| Team | W | L | Pct. | GB | Home | Road |
|---|---|---|---|---|---|---|
| ^{(1)} New York Yankees | 103 | 59 | .636 | — | 53‍–‍28 | 50‍–‍31 |
| Baltimore Orioles | 100 | 62 | .617 | 3 | 50‍–‍31 | 50‍–‍31 |
| Milwaukee Brewers | 86 | 76 | .531 | 17 | 40‍–‍42 | 46‍–‍34 |
| Boston Red Sox | 83 | 77 | .519 | 19 | 36‍–‍45 | 47‍–‍32 |
| Detroit Tigers | 84 | 78 | .519 | 19 | 43‍–‍38 | 41‍–‍40 |
| Cleveland Indians | 79 | 81 | .494 | 23 | 44‍–‍35 | 35‍–‍46 |
| Toronto Blue Jays | 67 | 95 | .414 | 36 | 35‍–‍46 | 32‍–‍49 |

AL West
| Team | W | L | Pct. | GB | Home | Road |
|---|---|---|---|---|---|---|
| ^{(2)} Kansas City Royals | 97 | 65 | .599 | — | 49‍–‍32 | 48‍–‍33 |
| Oakland Athletics | 83 | 79 | .512 | 14 | 46‍–‍35 | 37‍–‍44 |
| Minnesota Twins | 77 | 84 | .478 | 19½ | 44‍–‍36 | 33‍–‍48 |
| Texas Rangers | 76 | 85 | .472 | 20½ | 39‍–‍41 | 37‍–‍44 |
| Chicago White Sox | 70 | 90 | .438 | 26 | 37‍–‍42 | 33‍–‍48 |
| California Angels | 65 | 95 | .406 | 31 | 30‍–‍51 | 35‍–‍44 |
| Seattle Mariners | 59 | 103 | .364 | 38 | 36‍–‍45 | 23‍–‍58 |

Locations of teams for the 1977–1981 American League seasons
West East

=== National League final standings ===
NL East
| Team | W | L | Pct. | GB | Home | Road |
|---|---|---|---|---|---|---|
| ^{(2)} Philadelphia Phillies | 91 | 71 | .562 | — | 49‍–‍32 | 42‍–‍39 |
| Montreal Expos | 90 | 72 | .556 | 1 | 51‍–‍29 | 39‍–‍43 |
| Pittsburgh Pirates | 83 | 79 | .512 | 8 | 47‍–‍34 | 36‍–‍45 |
| St. Louis Cardinals | 74 | 88 | .457 | 17 | 41‍–‍40 | 33‍–‍48 |
| New York Mets | 67 | 95 | .414 | 24 | 38‍–‍44 | 29‍–‍51 |
| Chicago Cubs | 64 | 98 | .395 | 27 | 37‍–‍44 | 27‍–‍54 |

NL West
| Team | W | L | Pct. | GB | Home | Road |
|---|---|---|---|---|---|---|
| ^{(1)} Houston Astros | 93 | 70 | .571 | — | 55‍–‍26 | 38‍–‍44 |
| Los Angeles Dodgers | 92 | 71 | .564 | 1 | 55‍–‍27 | 37‍–‍44 |
| Cincinnati Reds | 89 | 73 | .549 | 3½ | 44‍–‍37 | 45‍–‍36 |
| Atlanta Braves | 81 | 80 | .503 | 11 | 50‍–‍30 | 31‍–‍50 |
| San Francisco Giants | 75 | 86 | .466 | 17 | 44‍–‍37 | 31‍–‍49 |
| San Diego Padres | 73 | 89 | .451 | 19½ | 45‍–‍36 | 28‍–‍53 |

Locations of teams for the 1977–1992 National League seasons
West East

== Nippon Professional Baseball final standings ==
=== Central League final standings ===
Central League
| Team | G | W | L | T | Pct. | GB |
|---|---|---|---|---|---|---|
| Hiroshima Toyo Carp | 130 | 73 | 44 | 13 | .624 | – |
| Yakult Swallows | 130 | 68 | 52 | 10 | .567 | 6.5 |
| Yomiuri Giants | 130 | 61 | 60 | 9 | .504 | 14.0 |
| Yokohama Taiyo Whales | 130 | 59 | 62 | 9 | .488 | 16.0 |
| Hanshin Tigers | 130 | 54 | 66 | 10 | .450 | 20.5 |
| Chunichi Dragons | 130 | 45 | 76 | 9 | .372 | 30.0 |

=== Pacific League final standings ===
Pacific League
| Team | G | W | L | T | Pct. | 1st half ranking | 2nd half ranking |
|---|---|---|---|---|---|---|---|
| Kintetsu Buffaloes | 130 | 68 | 54 | 8 | .557 | 2 | 1 |
| Lotte Orions | 130 | 64 | 51 | 15 | .557 | 1 | 3 |
| Nippon-Ham Fighters | 130 | 66 | 53 | 11 | .555 | 2 | 2 |
| Seibu Lions | 130 | 62 | 64 | 4 | .492 | 6 | 4 |
| Hankyu Braves | 130 | 58 | 67 | 5 | .464 | 4 | 5 |
| Nankai Hawks | 130 | 48 | 77 | 5 | .384 | 5 | 6 |

== Events ==
=== January ===
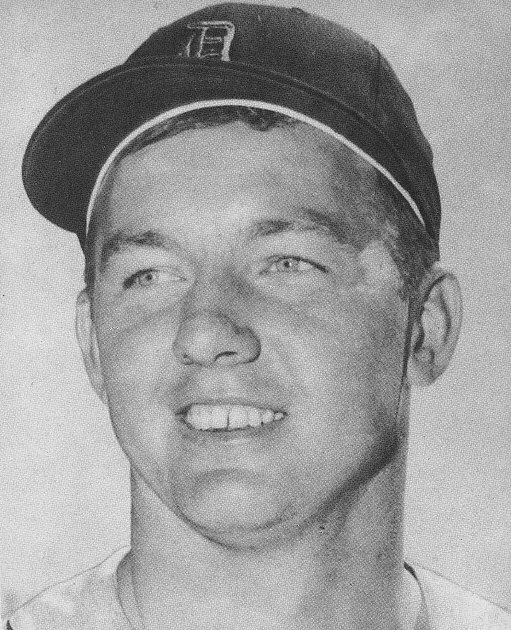
Al Kaline

- January 4 – David Clyde, who made his MLB debut as a promising prospect as a teenager, returns to the Texas Rangers as he and outfielder Jim Norris are sent to the Rangers by the Cleveland Indians in exchange for outfielder Gary Gray, pitcher Larry McCall, and minor league infielder Mike Bucci.
- January 5 – The Kansas City Royals sign pitcher Tom Candiotti. The undrafted 23-year-old had spent 1979 with the unaffiliated Victoria Mussels of the Class A Short Season Northwest League.
- January 9 – Al Kaline and Duke Snider are elected to the Hall of Fame by the Baseball Writers' Association of America. Kaline is the tenth player to be elected in his first year of eligibility, while Snider is making his 11th appearance on the ballot.
- January 24:
  - The New York Mets are sold by Charles Payson, husband of the club's late founding principal owner, Joan, to Doubleday & Company, headed by Nelson Doubleday Jr., and real-estate developer Fred Wilpon. The purchase price is an estimated $21.1 million, the highest amount yet paid for an American professional sports franchise.
  - The New York Yankees sign outfielder Jim Nettles, a free agent and the younger brother of their third baseman, Graig Nettles. Jim, 32, is a veteran of three American League teams dating to 1970, but he will spend his only year in the Yankee organization at Triple-A.
- January 31
  - After eight seasons, two World Series titles, two National League MVP Awards, eight All-Star selections, and four Gold Glove Awards, Joe Morgan, 35, leaves the Cincinnati Reds and signs with the Houston Astros as a free agent, returning to the city where his major league career began in 1963.
  - The Philadelphia Phillies sign veteran relief pitcher Lerrin LaGrow, granted free agency the previous November 1. LaGrow, 31, had gone 5–1 with four saves and a 3.41 earned run average in 31 games for the 1979 Los Angeles Dodgers.

=== February ===
- February 12 – The board of the Oakland–Alameda County Coliseum and the Oakland City Council both reject an attempt to buy out the remainder of the Athletics' stadium lease. This blocks an attempt to sell the team and a possible move to Denver.
- February 15:
  - The San Diego Padres acquire first baseman Willie Montañez from the Texas Rangers in exchange for future Hall-of-Fame pitcher Gaylord Perry, infielder Tucker Ashford and minor leaguer Joe Carroll. For Perry, now 41, the trade "reverses" a January 25, 1978, deal that sent him from the Rangers to the Padres, for whom Perry promptly won the 1978 National League Cy Young Award and then made the 1979 NL All-Star team.
  - Jerry Mumphrey's time on the Cleveland Indians' winter roster lasts only ten weeks when he's traded to the Padres for left-hander Bob Owchinko and outfielder Jim Wilhelm, who retires from baseball rather than report to Cleveland. The Indians had acquired outfielder Mumphrey, 27, from the St. Louis Cardinals as part of the deal that sent Bobby Bonds to St. Louis on December 7, 1979.
- February 20 – In his 20th and final season as owner of the Oakland Athletics franchise, Charles O. Finley makes his 17th managerial change, appointing Billy Martin, 51, the club's pilot for 1980. Martin was ousted from his brief second term as skipper of the New York Yankees on October 29 after a late-night altercation with a marshmallow salesman in a Minneapolis bar. The Oakland job is Martin's sixth managerial job in the past dozen years; he will earn headlines by transforming the woeful Athletics (54–108 in 1979) with "Billy Ball," and the A's will qualify for the postseason in 1981.
- February 21 – The new owners of the New York Mets make a key front-office hire, naming former Baltimore Orioles executive Frank Cashen general manager and chief operating officer. Cashen, 54, spent a decade as executive vice president of the Orioles (1965–1975) during their dynastic run of four American League pennants and two World Series titles. As the replacement for former GM Joe McDonald, Cashen will supervise the rebuilding of a Mets' team that has finished last in the NL East for three consecutive seasons, averaging 97 losses a year.

=== March ===
- March 6 – George Bamberger, who has piloted the Milwaukee Brewers to an outstanding 188–135 (.582) record in his two seasons as manager, suffers a heart attack at the club's Arizona spring training camp. Coach Buck Rodgers takes the team's reins on an emergency basis. Bamberger, 56, will undergo successful coronary bypass surgery three weeks later, but he will not return to the Brewer dugout until June 6.
- March 8 – Rookie Joe Charboneau of the Cleveland Indians is attacked outside a Mexico City hotel. A fan seeking his autograph stabs him in the chest with a pen. Charboneau misses the start of the year but goes on to bat .289, hitting 23 home runs, while driving in 87 RBI in 131 games. He will be elected American League Rookie of the Year.
- March 10 – The New York Yankees sign pitcher José Canó. Although he will eventually appear in six games for the 1989 Houston Astros, Canó, 18, will be released by the Yankees August 6 of this season after three Gulf Coast League games. However, his son Robinson Canó, born in 1982, will play 17 seasons in the majors and be chosen an eight-time AL All-Star, with five selections coming during his nine years (2005–2013) as a Yankee.
- March 12 – Slugger Chuck Klein and former Boston Red Sox owner Tom Yawkey are posthumously elected to the Hall of Fame by the Special Veterans Committee. Yawkey is the first club owner selected who never served as a player, manager, or general manager.
- March 27 – The Los Angeles Dodgers release pitcher Ken Brett and catcher Johnny Oates.
- March 30 – The Philadelphia Phillies trade backup catcher Dave Rader to the Boston Red Sox for cash and a "player to be named later" (utility infielder Stan Papi).
- March 31:
  - Less than two months after he was traded back to the Texas Rangers in hopes of reviving his career, David Clyde, 24, is released after continuing arm troubles. Although he will attempt a comeback in the minor leagues in 1981, the release brings an end to Clyde's MLB career.
  - The Rangers trade outfielders Chris Smith and LaRue Washington to the Montreal Expos for first baseman/DH Rusty Staub.

=== April ===
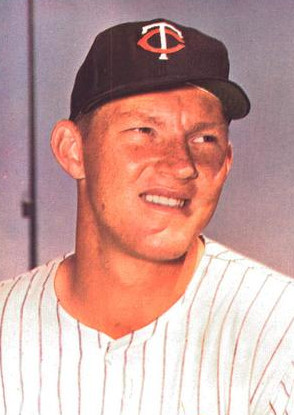
Jim Kaat in 1965

- April 1:
  - Left-hander and future Hall of Famer Jim Kaat, 41, returns to the New York Yankees after having been granted free agency from the Bombers on November 1, 1979.
  - The Chicago Cubs purchase the contract of Lenny Randle from the Seattle Mariners.
  - The Pittsburgh Pirates reacquire right-hander Odell Jones from the Mariners for cash and a player to be named later. The Pirates send Triple-A relief pitcher Larry Andersen to Seattle as the "PTBNL" on October 29.
- April 3 – The San Francisco Giants release pitcher Pedro Borbon.
- April 4 – The Philadelphia Phillies release pitchers Doug Bird and Rawly Eastwick and infielder Bud Harrelson.
- April 9:
  - Two days before the start of the season, the uniforms belonging to the Durham Bulls of the Carolina League are stolen. Hank Aaron, minor league director for Durham's parent club, the Atlanta Braves, sends the Bulls some used Braves road jerseys to tide them over until their uniforms can be replaced.
  - Starting on Opening Day for the Seattle Mariners, Mike Parrott gets the win in Seattle's 8–6 win over the Toronto Blue Jays. It will be Parrott's only victory of the year: he loses his next 16 decisions to go 1–16, for a winning percentage of .059.
- April 10:
  - At County Stadium, right fielder Sixto Lezcano of Milwaukee Brewers blasts a grand slam home run off Dick Drago of the Boston Red Sox on Opening Day in the bottom of the ninth to win the game, 9–5, making him the first player to hit two slams on Opening Day; he had previously done so in 1978.
  - After Texas Rangers starter Jon Matlack and New York Yankees starter Ron Guidry each pitch nine-inning shutout baseball, the Rangers win 1–0 in the 12th inning when Goose Gossage, in his only pitch of the game, uncorks a wild pitch with Richie Zisk at the plate. The wild pitch allows Ranger base runner (and former Yankee) Mickey Rivers to score from third.
  - Harold Baines makes his major league debut, going 0–4, striking out once, in the Chicago White Sox 5–3 loss against the Baltimore Orioles.
- April 12 – The Houston Astros' newly acquired Nolan Ryan makes his first National League start since 1971. Batting for the first time since 1972, Ryan belts his first career home run, a three-run shot, in the fourth inning off Don Sutton of the Los Angeles Dodgers. Ryan, however, only lasts six innings, and the Dodgers win the game 6–5 in 17 innings at the Astrodome.
- April 22 – In a classic slugfest at Wrigley Field, the Chicago Cubs outlast the St. Louis Cardinals, 16–12, on a two-out grand slam by Barry Foote off reliever Mark Littell in the bottom of the ninth inning. Foote knocks in eight runs overall with four hits and two homers, while teammate Iván de Jesús goes 5-for-6 and hits for the cycle, to help Chicago rally from an early 12–5 deficit.
- April 26 – Steve Carlton fires a one-hitter to lead the Philadelphia Phillies over the St. Louis Cardinals. Ted Simmons' second-inning single is the only St. Louis safety. This is the sixth one-hiter for Carlton since 1968; he will never throw a no-hitter in his 24-year, Hall of Fame career (1965–1988).
- April 29 – Oilman Eddie Chiles buys the Texas Rangers franchise from Brad Corbett for a reported $9.5 million. Corbett has owned the team since May 1974.
- April 30 – The Cardinals purchase the contract of Jim Kaat from the New York Yankees.

=== May ===
- May 1 – New York Mets starting pitcher Pete Falcone strikes out the first six batters he faces in a game versus the Philadelphia Phillies. Falcone strikes out Lonnie Smith, Pete Rose. Garry Maddox, Mike Schmidt, Greg Luzinski, and Bob Boone. The seventh batter, shortstop Larry Bowa, grounds out. Despite Falcone's early prowess, the Mets fall to Philadelphia 2–1.
- May 3:
  - Willie McCovey of the San Francisco Giants hits what will be the last of his 521 career home runs. The blow, off Scott Sanderson of the Montreal Expos, comes in the fourth inning of a Giants' 3–2 victory at Olympic Stadium. McCovey, 42, becomes the second player, after Ted Williams (who also retired with 521 career homers), to hit a home run in four different decades.
  - Ferguson Jenkins of the Texas Rangers becomes the fifth pitcher in major league history to win 100 games in both the NL and AL when he gets the decision in a 3–2 win over the Baltimore Orioles. He joined Al Orth, Cy Young, Jim Bunning and Gaylord Perry in the exclusive club.
- May 5 – Bill Madlock of the Pittsburgh Pirates is fined $5,000 and suspended for 15 days by NL president Chub Feeney. Madlock had shoved his glove in the face of umpire Jerry Crawford over a call in a game against the Montreal Expos four days earlier.
- May 7 – The Texas Rangers sign veteran shortstop Bud Harrelson.
- May 11 – Pete Rose of the Philadelphia Phillies steals second base, third base, and home plate in the Phillies 7–3 win over the Cincinnati Reds. Rose is the first player since Harvey Hendrick of the Pittsburgh Pirates in 1928 to pull off the stolen base cycle in one inning.

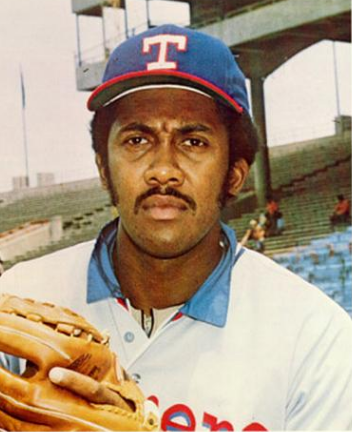
Ferguson Jenkins

- May 23:
  - The Rangers' Ferguson Jenkins wins his 250th game, defeating the Oakland Athletics. Jenkins fires a complete game, striking out eight batters in the victory.
  - In the early hours of the morning, the MLBPA and the owners reach a preliminary agreement, preventing a walk out by the players. However, the topic of free agency is tabled, an act that will lead to the players' 50-day strike the following season.
- May 27
  - The Detroit Tigers trade first baseman Jason Thompson, a two-time AL All-Star, to the California Angels for outfielder Al Cowens, a former Gold Glove Award winner and the runner-up in the balloting for 1977 American League MVP.
  - The St. Louis Cardinals release pitcher Pedro Borbon and outfielder Bernie Carbo.
- May 28 – Isao Harimoto of the Lotte Orions collects his 3,000 career hit. Harimoto will finish his career with 3,085 hits.
- May 29 – At San Diego Stadium, Johnny Bench of the Cincinnati Reds breaks Yogi Berra's all-time record for home runs by a catcher. He hits two home runs off Randy Jones in the Reds' 5–3 victory over the San Diego Padres; the first comes in the second inning and gives him 336 on his career and 306 as a catcher, breaking a tie he had shared with Berra.

=== June ===
- June 3 – The New York Mets select outfielder Darryl Strawberry out of Los Angeles' Crenshaw High School with the first overall pick in the June amateur draft. Other notable selections in the first round are third baseman Kelly Gruber (Cleveland Indians, tenth overall), outfielder/first baseman Terry Francona (Montreal Expos, 22nd), and future executive Billy Beane (Mets, 24th).
- June 4 – Jim Kaat, recently acquired by the St. Louis Cardinals from the New York Yankees, pitches ten shutout innings against the New York Mets. The Cardinals win, despite strong showings from Mets pitchers Pat Zachry and Neil Allen. The Cardinals win 1–0 win on a tenth-inning home run from third baseman Ken Reitz.
- June 6 – Houston's J. R. Richard fans 13 batters to highlight a three-hitter and Art Howe and Terry Puhl each get three hits to lead the Astros to a 2–0 victory over the San Francisco Giants.
- June 7 – The New York Mets acquire outfielder Claudell Washington from the Chicago White Sox for minor-league pitcher Jesse Anderson. Washington, 25, will become a free agent this coming off-season. But his half-season as a Met sees him belt three home runs in a June 22, 9–6 road victory over the Los Angeles Dodgers, to become the third player in contemporaneous MLB history (following Hall-of-Famers Babe Ruth and Johnny Mize) to do so in each major league.
- June 8 – Mired in a 5–21 morass that has plunged them into the NL East basement, the St. Louis Cardinals fire manager Ken Boyer, their former eleven-time All-Star third baseman and 1964 NL MVP, between games of a doubleheader at Montréal's Olympic Stadium. After coach Jack Krol handles them in the nightcap, the Cardinals announce they've hired Whitey Herzog as their new field manager. Herzog, 48, was sacked by the cross-state Kansas City Royals in October 1979; he will take command of the Redbird bench in Atlanta the following day.
- June 16 – Tim Foli drives in three runs and struggling Bert Blyleven earns the 150th pitching victory of his career to lead the Pittsburgh Pirates to a 5–3 win over the Cincinnati Reds on ABC's Monday Night Baseball.
- June 17 – The Cleveland Indians are forced to close off a portion of Municipal Stadium's stands due to rowdy fans pelting Milwaukee Brewers' outfielders Gorman Thomas and Sixto Lezcano with objects the previous day. That portion of the stadium will remain closed until more security is hired later in the month.
- June 20:
  - California Angels shortstop Freddie Patek hits three home runs and collects seven RBIs in the Angels' 20–2 victory over the Boston Red Sox at Fenway Park.
  - In the 11th inning at Comiskey Park, the Detroit Tigers' Al Cowens grounds out to shortstop off Chicago White Sox pitcher Ed Farmer. But instead of running towards first, Cowens attacks Farmer from behind; he's seeking revenge for a May 8, 1979, incident in which Farmer, a member then of the Texas Rangers, hit Cowens (then with the Kansas City Royals) with a pitch that broke Cowens' jaw and put him out of action for 21 games. Today's incident results in an arrest warrant for Cowens, which forces him to miss the rest of the series. He is also suspended for a week by the American League.
- June 23 – The Cleveland Indians trade designated hitter Cliff Johnson to the Chicago Cubs for cash and outfielder Karl Pagel (PTBNL). Johnson will play first base for the National League Cubs.
- June 25 – The San Francisco Giants' first baseman, Mike Ivie, abruptly announces his retirement from baseball, citing depression. Ivie will return to the Giants three weeks later, convinced by a phone call from teammate Willie McCovey.
- June 27 – At Candlestick Park, Jerry Reuss of the Los Angeles Dodgers no-hits the San Francisco Giants 8–0. A Bill Russell error on Jack Clark's first-inning ground ball is the only baserunner Reuss allows.

=== July ===
- July 1 – The New York Yankees release outfielder Paul Blair, ending his MLB career after 17 seasons, eight Gold Glove Awards and four World Series rings.
- July 3 – Minnesota Twins outfielder Ken Landreaux ties an American League record in hitting three triples during a win over the Texas Rangers. Earlier this season, Landreaux set a Twins' club record with a 31-game hitting streak, a record that still stands through 44 seasons.
- July 4:
  - Houston Astros pitcher Nolan Ryan strikes out César Gerónimo of the Cincinnati Reds, to become the fourth major league pitcher ever to reach 3,000 career strikeouts. Gerónimo was also Bob Gibson's 3,000th career strikeout victim six years earlier. Despite the milestone, Ryan allows six runs in 41/3 innings, and Houston loses, 8–1.
  - During the first-ever fireworks night hosted at Shea Stadium, Montreal Expos' rookie Bill Gullickson sails a pitch over New York Mets' first baseman Mike Jorgensen's head in the second game of a doubleheader. Jorgensen, victim of a serious beanball injury the previous season, angrily points his bat toward Gullickson and the benches clear. The Mets' John Stearns, not in the line-up for this game, charges out of his dugout and welcomes Gullickson to the majors by punching him and putting him in a headlock.
- July 6:
  - Philadelphia Phillies pitcher Steve Carlton becomes the major leagues' left-handed strikeout king, fanning seven Cardinals in an 8–3 Phillies win to bring his career total to 2,836. Mickey Lolich had held the record with 2,832.
  - At Three Rivers Stadium, the Chicago Cubs and Pittsburgh Pirates go 20 innings before the Pirates pull out a 5–4 victory. Omar Moreno gets the game-winning hit and RBI.
  - As the All-Star break begins, the divisional leaders are the Montreal Expos (42–34), ahead by a full game over the Philadelphia Phillies in the National League East; the Houston Astros (45–33) and Los Angeles Dodgers (46–34) virtually tied in the NL West; the New York Yankees (51–27) up by 7½ over the Detroit Tigers and Milwaukee Brewers in the AL East; and the Kansas City Royals (47–33) leading the Chicago White Sox by 8½ games in the AL West.
- July 8 – At Dodger Stadium, the National League battles back to win its ninth consecutive All-Star Game over the American League, 4–2. Ken Griffey goes 2-for-3 with a solo home run to win the MVP honors.
- July 11:
  - The Los Angeles Dodgers sell the contract of pitcher Charlie Hough to the Texas Rangers.
  - The Montreal Expos trade former 20-game-winner Ross Grimsley to the Cleveland Indians for infielder Dave Oliver. After posting a 20–11 record (3.05 ERA) for the Expos in 1978, southpaw Grimsley has gone 8–13 (5.56) in 43 games for Montreal since.
- July 18 – The 19-year-old New York Mets play their 3,000th game, falling 8–3 in the second game of a double header against the Cincinnati Reds.
- July 21 – The San Francisco Giants and Chicago Cubs play 12 scoreless innings before the game is suspended due to darkness at light-less Wrigley Field. Starters Ed Whitson and Rick Reuschel each go eight innings before turning the game over to their bullpens. When the game's resumed the following day, it remains 0–0 until the top of the 15th, when Larry Herndon smacks a two-run homer that's the difference in a 2–0 Giants' victory.
- July 23 – The Chicago Cubs terminate the managerial tenure of Preston Gómez after the 90th game of his first season at the helm. He's replaced by longtime coach Joey Amalfitano, who had been the Cubs' acting manager for the closing days of the 1979 campaign. Gómez departs Chicago with a 38–52 (.422) record.
- July 25 – Mike Schmidt slugs his 260th home run, passing Del Ennis as the Philadelphia Phillies' franchise leader in long balls.
- July 27 – Three days after he is released by the Atlanta Braves, pitcher Terry Leach is signed by the New York Mets. Leach will be a key player in the club's 1986 World Series win.

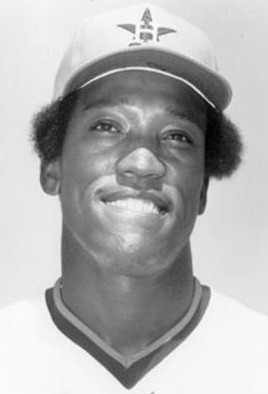
J. R. Richard

- July 28 – The New York Yankees sell the contract of right-hander Ed Figueroa to the Texas Rangers. Figueroa, 30, spent three years as a key part of the Yankees' rotation and went 20–9 (2.99) for the 1978 world champion Bombers, but has struggled with arm miseries since: 7–9 (5.15) in 31 games. He will go winless (0–7) in eight starts as a Ranger.
- July 30 – Houston Astros ace right-hander J. R. Richard—the National League's starting pitcher in the 1980 Major League Baseball All-Star Game on July 8—suffers a stroke while warming up for his first attempt to pitch since being hospitalized for tests a week earlier. Although he will attempt a comeback in the minor leagues in 1982, Richard's MLB pitching career is over at age 30.

=== August ===
- August 1 – The New York Yankees sign 15-year-old pitching prospect José Rijo of San Cristóbal, Dominican Republic, as an amateur free agent.
- August 4 – The Seattle Mariners, who've lost 20 of their last 24 games, fire manager Darrell Johnson, and replace him with Maury Wills. Johnson is the only skipper the Mariners have had since entering MLB in 1977; he departs with a 226–362 (.384) record. Wills, 47, is the former star shortstop of the Los Angeles Dodgers and National League MVP and has been a broadcaster since his 1972 playing retirement.
- August 5:
  - Chicago Cubs rookie shortstop Steve Macko suffers a bad bruise in a collision with the Pittsburgh Pirates' Bill Madlock in the first game of a doubleheader. Macko drives in a run with a double, is pinch-run for by Rick Reuschel, and never plays another game in the majors. Doctors examining Macko discover that he has testicular cancer, a disease that will claim his life at age 27 in November 1981.
  - The visiting Los Angeles Dodgers lead the Atlanta Braves 4–1 with two out in the bottom of the ninth inning when an error by Ron Cey opens the floodgates. Six Braves in a row reach base against Rick Sutcliffe, Steve Howe and Don Stanhouse, culminated by Glenn Hubbard's three-run "walk-off home run" that gives Atlanta a stirring, 6–4, come-from-behind win.
- August 11:
  - Reggie Jackson of the New York Yankees hits his 400th career home run; it comes off Britt Burns of the Chicago White Sox.
  - The Kansas City Royals sign southpaw hurler Ken Brett as a free agent; he had been released by the Los Angeles Dodgers March 27. Initially assigned to Triple-A Omaha, Ken will join his younger brother, Royals superstar George Brett, on the MLB roster September 1.
- August 12 – A crowd of 48,361 fans jams Tiger Stadium to watch former Detroit ace Mark Fidrych attempt a comeback. He goes eight innings and permits only three earned runs, but the visiting Boston Red Sox win, 5–4, on a Jim Dwyer home run. Fidrych will make only eight more starts through the end of 1980, his final MLB season.
- August 14 – The New York Yankees, whose AL East lead over the Baltimore Orioles is only 3½ games, acquire Gaylord Perry from the Texas Rangers for pitcher Ken Clay and a PTBNL, minor-league outfielder Marv Thompson. Future Hall-of-Famer Perry, 41, will go 4–4, 4.44 in ten games (including eight starts) for New York before entering free agency during the off-season.
- August 15 – The visiting Houston Astros score two unearned runs in the top of the 20th inning, then hold off the San Diego Padres in the home half to claim a 3–1 victory. Four Astros' pitchers keep the Padres off the scoreboard for the final 19 innings of the marathon contest.
- August 17 – The Detroit Tigers retire uniform #6 in honor of Hall-of-Famer Al Kaline. He becomes the first player in Tigers' history to be so honored. In coming years, older Hall of Famers like Charlie Gehringer (#2) and Hank Greenberg (#5) are similarly feted.
- August 20 – With one out in the ninth inning, Chicago White Sox outfielder Leo Sutherland singles off Cleveland Indians pitcher Dan Spillner, breaking up Spillner's no-hit bid. He then retires the next two batters to secure the 3–0 victory.
- August 21:
  - Oakland A's owner Charlie Finley announces that he has agreed to sell the team to clothing industry magnate Walter A. Haas Jr. for a reported $12.7 million, assuring that the franchise will stay in Oakland. Oil tycoon Marvin Davis had wanted to purchase the A's and move the team to Denver. The notorious yet innovative Finley owned the Athletics for two decades, and his club won five consecutive AL West titles (1971–1975) and three straight World Series championships (1972–1974). But he left bitter legacies when he abandoned Kansas City in 1967, then maintained a barebones operation that was nearly abandoned by its fan base, once his Oakland dynasty was stripped of its star players by post-Seitz decision free agency beginning in 1977.
  - At Veterans Stadium, the San Diego Padres drop another lengthy extra-inning contest when Bake McBride drives in Mike Schmidt with an RBI triple in the bottom half of the 17th frame to give the Philadelphia Phillies a 10–9 victory.
  - Veteran outfielder José Cardenal, 36, signs as a free agent with the Kansas City Royals; he'd been released by the New York Mets eight days earlier. Cardenal will bat .340 in 25 games through the regular season, and appear in four games of the 1980 World Series as he wraps up an 18-year MLB playing career.

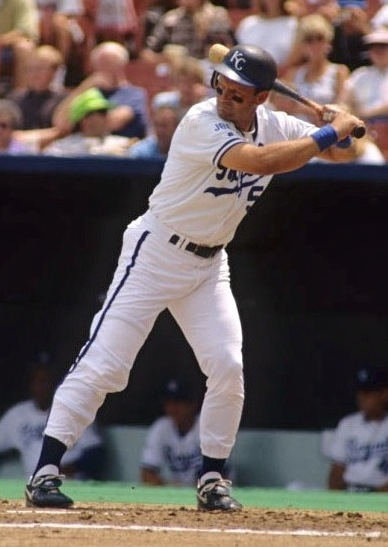
American League MVP George Brett

- August 23 – The NL West-leading Houston Astros win another extra-innings pitching duel. Today they battle the Chicago Cubs to a scoreless tie into the home half of 17th at the Astrodome. Houston relievers Bert Roberge, Joe Sambito and Joe Niekro hold the Cubs to only one hit in nine innings of shutout relief. Finally, in the Astro 17th, Niekro himself singles home Enos Cabell with the winning tally for a 1–0 victory.
- August 24 – Gene Mauch resigns as manager of the Minnesota Twins and third base coach John Goryl takes over. The Twins, who were 26 games out of first place, win 23 of the remaining 36 games of the season.
- August 26:
  - George Brett of the Kansas City Royals goes five-for-five in a victory over the Milwaukee Brewers. Brett's four singles and a double in five at bats raise his batting average to .407.
  - The San Diego Padres find themselves in another drawn-out battle, their third 17-plus-inning contest in 11 days. This time, however, they emerge victorious with an 18-inning, 8–6 win over the New York Mets at Shea Stadium. The three marathons consume 55 innings, 16 hours and 31 minutes, and come during a 2–12 team tailspin that began August 11.
- August 27 – The Philadelphia Phillies' Steve Carlton becomes the first National League pitcher to win twenty games this season, combining with Tug McGraw to beat the Los Angeles Dodgers, 4–3. Carlton will win a league-high 24 games while pitching 304 innings, the last MLB pitcher to throw more than 300 innings in a season.
- August 28 – The St. Louis Cardinals promote field manager Whitey Herzog to general manager (GM). Herzog has led the Cards to a 38–35 record since taking the helm on June 9. He replaces the fired John Claiborne as chief baseball executive, and names bench coach Red Schoendienst acting manager for the remainder of the 1980 season. Herzog will return to the Cardinal dugout as both manager/GM in 1981 after remaking the team with three major December 1980 trades. His three National League pennants between 1982 and 1987 will secure Herzog a spot in the Hall of Fame.
- August 31 – The Montreal Expos, who begin today tied for first place in a torrid, three-team NL East divisional race, acquire power-hitting first baseman Willie Montañez from the San Diego Padres for cash and 21-year-old prospect Tony Phillips, currently playing with Double-A Memphis.

=== September ===
- September 1:
  - Wade Boggs, playing for the Pawtucket Red Sox, loses the batting title on the last day of the season. Pawtucket is playing the Toledo Mud Hens, who force Boggs' last at-bat by walking the light hitting Ray Boyer. The Mud Hens, who lead the game 6–0, allow Boyer to take bases at will. Boggs ends up grounding out to first to end the game, lowering his average from .3069 to .3062, .0005 points behind the .3067 posted by Dave Engle—who just happens to play for the Mud Hens.
  - Ed Farmer of the Chicago White Sox, who'd been assaulted by Al Cowens of the Detroit Tigers during a game on June 20, agrees to drop the charges. Before today's Detroit–Chicago game, both men bring their club's line-up cards to the home plate umpire and later shake hands. The fans aren't as forgiving: they boo Cowens every time he comes to bat. (See entry for June 20, 1980, above.)
  - Labor Day action concludes and the stretch run begins with three hot divisional races. There's a virtual three-way tie in the NL East, with the 69–60 Philadelphia Phillies only .001 ahead of the Montreal Expos and Pittsburgh Pirates. In the NL West, the 75–57 Houston Astros hold a half-game edge over the Los Angeles Dodgers with the Cincinnati Reds only 2½ back. The AL East features a two-team battle, with the 79–51 New York Yankees 1½ lengths ahead of the Baltimore Orioles. The only exception is the AL West, where the 85–47 Kansas City Royals have built a 19½-game bulge over the second-place Texas Rangers and are the only team playing over-.500 ball.
- September 7 – George Bamberger quits as manager of the Milwaukee Brewers and hands the reins permanently to third-base coach Buck Rodgers, who had piloted the team during Bamberger's early-season medical leave. The disappointing Brewers are 73–66 and 13½ games out of first in the AL East. They have gone only 47–45 since Bamberger's return from heart surgery June 6.
- September 8:
  - Commissioner Bowie Kuhn suspends pitcher Ferguson Jenkins following Jenkins' drug arrest. An arbitrator later re-instates Jenkins.
  - The Philadelphia Phillies sign free agent catcher Tim McCarver in what will be the 38-year-old's final season, and enable McCarver to have played in the majors across four decades. Future Ford C. Frick Award winner McCarver has already begun his television career on the Phillies' broadcast team.
- September 10 – Bill Gullickson strikes out 18, the most by a major league rookie pitcher, as the Montreal Expos beat the Chicago Cubs 4–2.
- September 13 – The Texas Rangers trade relief pitcher Sparky Lyle to the Philadelphia Phillies for a PTBNL (pitcher Kevin Saucier).
- September 17:
  - The Kansas City Royals, now 90–56, split a doubleheader with the visiting California Angels, and in the process clinch their fourth American League West Division crown in the past five seasons.
  - In a wild game in The Bronx, the last-place Toronto Blue Jays battle the first-place New York Yankees to a 3–3 tie into the tenth inning, then take a two-run lead in the top of the tenth when the game is halted, then suspended, by rain. When it's resumed the following night, the Jays—still at bat—add two more tallies on an inside-the-park home run by Roy Howell to grab a 7–3 lead. But in the home half, the Yankees even the score 7–7 with four runs off Toronto reliever Dave Stieb. The teams fight on to the 13th, when the Bombers finally prevail, 8–7, on an RBI double by Bucky Dent.
- September 18 – Gary Ward hits for the cycle in a 9–8 Minnesota Twins loss to Milwaukee. Ward, 26, does it in only the 14th game of his career, which still stands as the major league record for the fewest games played before hitting for the cycle.
- September 19 – The Kansas City Royals rout the visiting Oakland A's, 13–3. George Brett gets two hits to keep his average above .400, marking today as the latest in a season that a player is hitting at or above .400 since Ted Williams hit .406 in 1941.
- September 20
  - Brett goes 0-for-4, dropping his batting average below .400. It will not climb above .400 again, and he finishes the season with a .390 batting average, the closest any player has come to .400 since Ted Williams 39 years earlier. Only Tony Gwynn will come closer before the 20th century ends.
  - A bronze plaque dedicated to Thurman Munson, who died the previous season in a plane crash, is unveiled in Yankee Stadium's monument park.
- September 23 – Jack McKeon, the San Diego Padres' acting head of baseball operations since the July departure of Bob Fontaine Sr., is named the club's official general manager. McKeon, 49, is a former MLB manager (Kansas City Royals, Oakland Athletics) who will soon become known as "Trader Jack," the Padres' bold wheeler-dealer who reshapes the team and, ultimately, produces a National League pennant in 1984.
- September 24 – The Atlanta Braves reach the 1,000,000 mark in attendance. It marks the first time that every National League team has drawn at least 1,000,000 fans for a season.
- September 25 – In dropping a 6–4 decision to the visiting Chicago White Sox, Brian Kingman of the Oakland A's becomes the first 20-game loser for an above-.500 team since Dolf Luque of the Cincinnati Reds in 1922. Kingman will also be the last 20th-century MLB pitcher to endure a 20-loss season.
- September 28 – Before an ABC national television audience, the Montreal Expos beat the Philadelphia Phillies, 8–3, to take a half-game lead in the National League East Division. Steve Rogers picks up his 16th win of the season while Gary Carter is the Expos' offensive hero, going three-for-four including two home runs. Carter's day will put him on the cover of Sports Illustrated the following week.
- September 30 – The smallest crowd in Shea Stadium annals—1,754 fans—watch the New York Mets defeat the Pittsburgh Pirates, 3–2.

=== October ===
- October 1 – The Boston Red Sox fire manager Don Zimmer due to pressure from fans, who never forgave Zimmer for the late season collapse in 1978 that led to the one-game playoff in which Bucky Dent hit the game-winning home run for the New York Yankees over the Green Monster. Zimmer departs Boston with a 411–304 (.575) record over 4½ years as skipper.
- October 4:
  - In a 17–1 rout of the Minnesota Twins, Willie Wilson of the Kansas City Royals becomes the first major league player ever to be credited with 700 at-bats in a single season, and ends the year with 705 at bats. He also sets the AL record for singles in a season with 184, eclipsing the mark Sam Rice set in 1925. Wilson also becomes only the second player in major league history to collect 100 hits from each side of the plate, matching the feat accomplished by Garry Templeton in 1979.
  - Mike Schmidt belts a two-run homer in the top of the 11th inning to give his Philadelphia Phillies a 6–4 triumph over the Montreal Expos at Olympic Stadium, clinching the National League East title. The home run is Schmidt's 48th of the season, breaking Eddie Mathews' single-season record for third basemen set in 1953.
- October 5:
  - On October 3, the Los Angeles Dodgers had been down three games to the Houston Astros to tie for the National League West Division title. Needing a sweep of the Astros going into their three-game set at Chavez Ravine, the Dodgers complete just such a sweep today—each of the wins by a single run. Los Angeles will host a one-game tie-breaker game tomorrow.
  - Panamanian outfielder Ben Oglivie of the Milwaukee Brewers homers off the Oakland Athletics' Rick Langford, tying him with Reggie Jackson. His feat makes Oglivie the first player not born in the United States to lead the AL in home runs.
  - Although they drop their closing game of 1980, the Athletics mark a radical turnaround in their fortunes. Under manager Billy Martin and his brand of aggressive play—nicknamed "Billy Ball" by a Bay Area columnist—they finish 83–79 (a 29-game improvement over 1979) and second in the AL West, and draw 842,259 through the Oakland–Alameda County Coliseum's turnstiles, a 175% increase over the prior year. Moreover, the franchise rids itself of the corrosive Charlie Finley regime. New owner Walter A. Haas Jr. begins to pour resources into a makeover of entire organization. As part of a series of off-season changes, Haas gives Martin general manager responsibilities to accompany his on-field duties.
- October 6:
  - After his team suffers through a three-game sweep at the hands of the Los Angeles Dodgers over the last three days, Joe Niekro wins his 20th game of the season to deliver a division title for his Houston Astros, 7–1, in a tie-breaker playoff over the Angelenos. As the newly crowned kings of the NL West, the Astros celebrate their first postseason appearance since first taking the field in 1962 as an expansion team.
  - Jerry Coleman returns to the San Diego Padres' broadcast booth after his single season as manager yields a last-place, 73–89 result. Former slugger Frank Howard, 44, a Milwaukee Brewers coach since 1977, is named Coleman's successor.
- October 9 – The Kansas City Royals win Game 2 of the 1980 ALCS 3–2 over the visiting New York Yankees and the game is remembered for the top of the eighth inning. With New York's Willie Randolph on first with two outs, Bob Watson lines a double to left. Yankee third base coach Mike Ferraro waves Randolph home, but the Royals gun him down at the plate. With a national television audience looking on, Yankee owner George Steinbrenner is shown in the stands shouting Ferraro's name at general manager Gene Michael. After the game Steinbrenner publicly orders manager Dick Howser to fire Ferraro on the spot, but Howser refuses.
- October 10 – Two eventual Hall of Famers decide Game 3 of the 1980 American League Championship Series. With the New York Yankees ahead in the top of the seventh, 2–1, Kansas City Royals superstar George Brett delivers a three-run homer off Yankees' star reliever Rich Gossage—and with it, a three-game series sweep and total revenge for the Royals. They celebrate the first-ever AL pennant in their 12-year history at Yankee Stadium after being eliminated by the Bombers in three consecutive ALCS match-ups (1976, 1977 and 1978).
- October 12 – The Philadelphia Phillies capture their first pennant since 1950, and only the third in their long history, with an 8–7 win over the Houston Astros at the Astrodome in the fifth and final game of the 1980 National League Championship Series. Each of the last four games is decided in extra innings. Today the Phillies, down by three runs to Nolan Ryan in the eighth, rally to go ahead on Garry Maddox's double in the tenth inning.
- October 21 – For the first time in their 98-year history, the Philadelphia Phillies win a professional baseball championship, defeating the Kansas City Royals 4–1 in Game 6 of the 1980 World Series. Steve Carlton earns the win, though the most memorable moment may be reliever Tug McGraw's jumping for joy on the mound when he earns the save after loading the bases with no outs. Philadelphia's Mike Schmidt is named MVP, hitting .381 with two home runs and seven RBI, while KC's Willie Wilson is the "goat", striking out a record 12 times—including the final out of Game 6 with the bases loaded. Of the original 16 Major League franchises from 1901, the Phillies (who joined the National League in 1883) are the last to win their first World Series.
- October 22 – Outfielder Dave Winfield of the San Diego Padres is officially declared a free agent. He will be among 49 players granted free agency between today and November 28, including fellow future Hall of Famers Gaylord Perry and Don Sutton.
- October 24 – The St. Louis Cardinals announce that newly appointed general manager Whitey Herzog will return to the Redbird dugout and serve as both manager and GM for the 1981 season. Herzog had temporarily surrendered the former job August 29 to interim pilot Red Schoendienst when he was appointed head of the club's baseball operations department.
- October 26 – Ralph Houk, 61, comes out of a two-year retirement to become manager of the Boston Red Sox. Though known primarily for his years as skipper of the New York Yankees, Houk's most recent job was as manager of the Detroit Tigers during their successful, five-year rebuilding program that concluded with a winning record in 1978.
- October 27 – Two weeks after his Houston Astros post the best season in their 19-year history, and two weeks before he'll be named The Sporting News Executive of the Year, general manager Tal Smith is unceremoniously fired by Astros' principal owner John J. McMullen. Smith's GM post is immediately filled by former New York Yankees club president Al Rosen. McMullen gives no reason for his stunning decision—but Smith alleges that the neophyte owner is jealous because he didn't receive enough credit for the Astros' success. Smith's dismissal causes a rebellion among the Astros' limited partners, who mount an unsuccessful "coup" attempt to oust McMullen, but the firing will stand.

=== November ===
- November 3:
  - The Sporting News bestows its year-end awards: George Brett is named American League Player of the Year; Steve Stone, AL Pitcher of the Year; Steve Carlton, NL Pitcher of the Year; and teammate Mike Schmidt, NL Player of the Year.
  - The Oakland Athletics trade pitcher Mike Morgan, 21, a former first-round draft choice, to the New York Yankees for veteran infielder Fred Stanley. Morgan is in the early stages of a 22-year MLB career that will encompass four decades and service with 12 different clubs.
- November 4 – Sadaharu Oh announces his retirement as a player from Japanese baseball. His 868 documented career home runs remains an unapproached world record among professional baseball players.
- November 6 – Lou Gorman, the Seattle Mariners' most senior baseball executive from the expansion team's founding days in 1976, resigns as general manager to become vice president, baseball operations with the New York Mets. Working under Mets' GM and chief operating officer Frank Cashen, he'll play a key role in acquiring and developing talent for the club's mid-to-late 1980s National League powerhouse. In Seattle, club president Dan O'Brien assumes Gorman's former responsibilities.
- November 12:
  - Baltimore Orioles pitcher Steve Stone, who led the American League with 25 victories, wins the Cy Young Award over Mike Norris of the Oakland Athletics.
  - Don Zimmer is named manager of the Texas Rangers, succeeding Pat Corrales; Zimmer becomes the club's tenth manager in the nine years since it moved from Washington in 1972.
- November 15 – The Atlanta Braves sign outfielder Claudell Washington, granted free agency from the New York Mets on October 31.

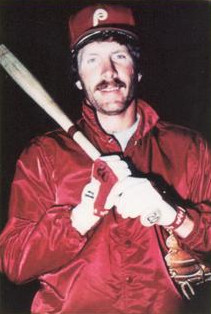
National League MVP Mike Schmidt

- November 18 – Catcher Brad Gulden is traded for himself. The New York Yankees trade Gulden to the Seattle Mariners for veteran infielder Larry Milbourne and a player to be named later. In May 1981, Gulden will be traded back to the Yankees as the PTBNL, officially making Gulden the first player since Harry Chiti to be traded for himself.
- November 21 – Gene Michael, 42, becomes the 25th manager in New York Yankees history, replacing Dick Howser, who led the team to the AL East title with a 103–59 mark. Although principal owner George Steinbrenner avows "I did not fire the man" and Howser refuses to comment, speculation is rampant that Howser's exit was orchestrated by Steinbrenner. Howser says he will pursue a business opportunity outside of baseball in 1981. Meanwhile, Michael's former responsibilities as general manager will be assumed by Yankee executives Cedric Tallis and Bill Bergesch.
- November 26
  - Philadelphia Phillies third baseman Mike Schmidt, who hit .286 with career highs of 48 home runs and 121 RBI is a unanimous choice by the BBWAA as the National League Most Valuable Player for 1980.
  - The Chicago White Sox sign centerfielder and NL stolen base leader Ron LeFlore, granted free agency from the Montreal Expos on October 28.

=== December ===
- December 1 – Los Angeles Dodgers relief pitcher Steve Howe wins the National League Rookie of the Year Award, edging Montreal Expos starting pitcher Bill Gullickson and outfielder Lonnie Smith of the Philadelphia Phillies. Howe posted a 7–9 record with a 2.65 ERA and 17 saves.
- December 2 – The California Angels sign left-hander Geoff Zahn, granted free agency from the Minnesota Twins on October 23.
- December 4 – The Houston Astros sign future Hall of Fame pitcher Don Sutton, granted free agency from the Los Angeles Dodgers on October 23. Sutton, 35, is the reigning earned run average leader (2.20) of the National League; he has spent 15 seasons with the Dodgers and won 230 games so far in his long career.
- December 6 – Lefty relief ace Tug McGraw opts to return to the world-champion Philadelphia Phillies. He had been granted free agency on November 5.
- December 7 – The St. Louis Cardinals sign four-time AL All-Star catcher Darrell Porter, granted free agency from the Kansas City Royals on November 24.
- December 8:
  - In one of the highest-profile trades ever at the annual winter meetings, the San Diego Padres send catcher Bob Geren, future Hall of Fame closer Rollie Fingers, left-hander Bob Shirley and first baseman Gene Tenace to the St. Louis Cardinals in exchange for catchers Terry Kennedy and Steve Swisher, pitchers John Littlefield, Al Olmsted, John Urrea and Kim Seaman, and infielder Mike Phillips.
  - Eighteen players change organizations in the 1980 Rule 5 draft. Among them, the Toronto Blue Jays select outfielder George Bell from the Philadelphia Phillies, the Milwaukee Brewers claim pitcher Tom Candiotti from the Kansas City Royals, and the Chicago Cubs pick up catcher Jody Davis from the St. Louis Cardinals.
  - The Houston Astros release second baseman Joe Morgan. The future Hall of Famer, 37, batted only .243 in 141 games in his one-year, second stint with Houston, but led the NL in bases on balls received (93).
- December 9:
  - The Chicago Cubs trade relief pitcher Bruce Sutter to their arch-rivals, the St. Louis Cardinals, in exchange for first baseman Leon Durham, third baseman Ken Reitz and outfielder Ty Waller (PTBNL). Future Hall-of-Famer Sutter will go on to save 127 games in four seasons as a Cardinal, and win a World Series ring; Durham's critical error in Game 5 of the 1984 NLCS will doom the Cubs.
  - The Cleveland Indians acquire starting pitcher and future Cooperstown inductee Bert Blyleven, 30, from the Pittsburgh Pirates, along with veteran catcher Manny Sanguillén, for pitchers Victor Cruz, Bob Owchinko and Rafael Vásquez and outfielder/DH Gary Alexander.
  - The Kansas City Royals sign veteran first baseman/DH Lee May, granted free agency from the Baltimore Orioles October 23.
  - The San Francisco Giants fire manager Dave Bristol during the winter meetings. He had led them to an 85–98 (.464) cumulative record since succeeding Joe Altobelli on September 6, 1979.
- December 10:
  - The California Angels trade relief pitcher Mark Clear and starting third baseman Carney Lansford to the Boston Red Sox for shortstop Rick Burleson and third baseman Butch Hobson. Lansford, 23, will win the 1981 American League batting title (.336). Burleson, 29, is traded because he'll hit free agency after the 1981 season. He signs a six-year contract with the Angels in March 1981 and will be selected to his fourth AL All-Star team before injuries ruin his playing career.
  - The Detroit Tigers obtain pitcher Kevin Saucier from the Texas Rangers in exchange for shortstop Mark Wagner.
  - The Houston Astros sign third baseman Dave Roberts, granted free agency from the Rangers on November 4.
- December 12:
  - The St. Louis Cardinals trade newly acquired closer Rollie Fingers, All-Star catcher Ted Simmons and pitcher Pete Vuckovich to the Milwaukee Brewers for pitchers Dave LaPoint and Lary Sorensen and outfielders David Green and Sixto Lezcano.
  - The Texas Rangers and Seattle Mariners make an intradivisional, eleven-player trade. The Rangers send pitchers Brian Allard, Ken Clay, Jerry Don Gleaton and Steve Finch, infielder Rick Auerbach and slugging DH Richie Zisk to Seattle for pitcher Rick Honeycutt, catcher Larry Cox, infielder Mario Mendoza, outfielder Leon Roberts and DH Willie Horton.
  - The Atlanta Braves deal starting pitcher Doyle Alexander to the San Francisco Giants for right-hander John Montefusco and minor-league outfielder Craig Landis.
  - The Giants also acquire outfielders Jerry Morales and Jesús Figueroa and minor league third baseman Mike Turgeon (PTBNL) from the Chicago Cubs for southpaw hurler Phil Nastu and second baseman Joe Strain.
  - The Toronto Blue Jays trade outfielder Bob Bailor to the New York Mets for right-hander Roy Lee Jackson.
  - The Chicago Cubs trade Mike Vail to the Cincinnati Reds for fellow outfielder Héctor Cruz.
  - Veteran first baseman Willie Montañez returns to the Montreal Expos; he had been granted free agency from the San Diego Padres October 26.
- December 15:
  - Outfielder Dave Winfield signs a ten-year, $16 million contract with the New York Yankees—making him the richest athlete in professional sports and signaling the end of Reggie Jackson's days in pinstripes when owner George Steinbrenner informs Jackson his free agent option will not be picked up once his current contract ends.
  - The New York Mets acquire 1976 NL Cy Young Award winner Randy Jones from the San Diego Padres for pitcher John Pacella and infielder/outfielder José Moreno.
- December 16 – The Mets sign Rusty Staub, 36, granted free agency from the Texas Rangers on October 23. Staub, a star for the 1972–1975 Mets, will spend the remainder of his 23-year big-league career with them as a pinch hitter and part-time first baseman.
- December 17:
  - The San Diego Padres sign infielder Ozzie Guillen as an undrafted amateur free agent.
  - The Baltimore Orioles sign DH José Morales, granted free agency from the Minnesota Twins October 24.
- December 22:
  - The Boston Red Sox tender contracts, by mail, to pending free agents Carlton Fisk and Fred Lynn—but they miss the deadline to do so by two days. The blunder, committed by Boston general manager Haywood Sullivan, quickly catches the attention of the Major League Baseball Players Association, which files a grievance with the Player Relations Committee seeking an arbitration hearing that could lead to their immediate free agency. New England native son Fisk, 33, is a future Baseball Hall of Famer who, to date, has been selected to seven AL All-Star teams and won the 1972 American League Rookie of the Year Award. Lynn, 28, has made six All-Star teams and won four Gold Glove Awards in six full years with the Red Sox, and in 1975 became the first player to be selected Rookie of the Year and AL Most Valuable Player in the same season. The hearing will take place late in January 1981.
  - The St. Louis Cardinals release outfielder Bobby Bonds, 34.
  - The Yomiuri Giants purchase the contract of outfielder Gary Thomasson from the Los Angeles Dodgers.
- December 23 – The Baltimore Orioles sign outfielder Jim Dwyer, granted free agency from the Boston Red Sox on October 22.
- December 29:
  - The California Angels sign outfielder Juan Beníquez, granted free agency from the Seattle Mariners October 24.
  - The Cleveland Indians sign outfielder Pat Kelly, granted free agency from the Baltimore Orioles October 23.

== Births ==
=== January ===
- January 3 – Brad Salmon
- January 10 – Matt Roney
- January 12 – Bobby Crosby
- January 15:
  - JD Closser
  - Matt Holliday
- January 16:
  - Brooks Conrad
  - Albert Pujols
- January 17:
  - T. J. Bohn
  - Mike Rabelo
- January 20:
  - Franklyn Germán
  - Luis Martínez
- January 25 – Phil Stockman
- January 26:
  - Brandon Medders
  - Antonio Pérez

=== February ===
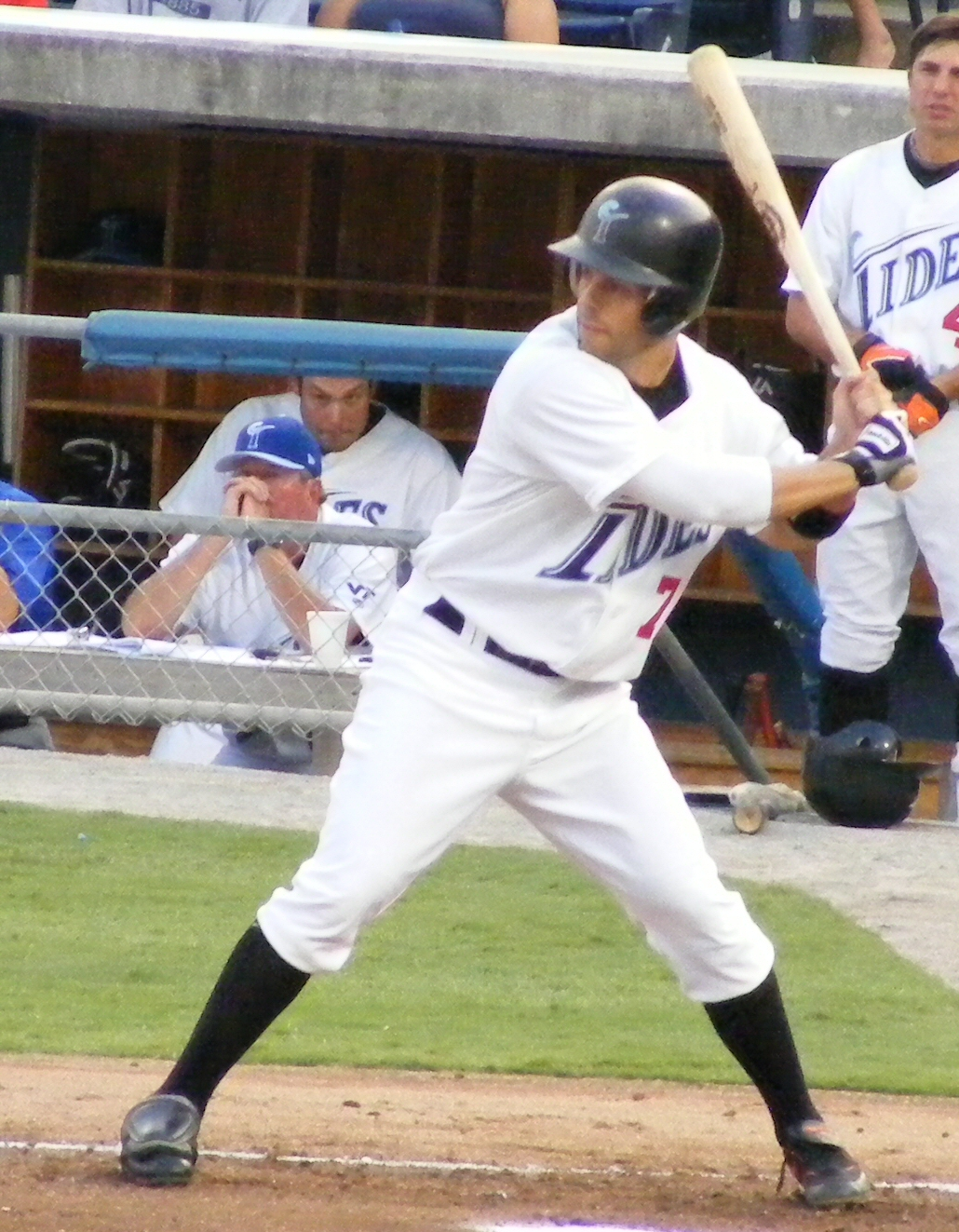
Adam Stern

- February 1 – Héctor Luna
- February 3 – Skip Schumaker
- February 4:
  - Steve Schmoll
  - Doug Slaten
- February 7 – Brad Hennessey
- February 10 – César Izturis
- February 11 – Matt Lindstrom
- February 12 – Adam Stern
- February 13 – Drew Henson
- February 15 – Don Kelly
- February 18 – Walter Young
- February 20 – Ryan Langerhans
- February 22 – Ramón Nivar
- February 26 – Gary Majewski
- February 27 – John Hattig

=== March ===
- March 1 – Micah Hoffpauir
- March 4 – Jack Hannahan
- March 7 – Scott Munter
- March 11:
  - Chris Burke
  - Rich Hill
  - Dan Uggla
- March 13 – Byron Gettis
- March 15 – Freddie Bynum
- March 25 – Neal Cotts
- March 31 – Chien-Ming Wang

=== April ===
- April 3 – Justin Christian
- April 7 – Vinny Rottino
- April 9 – Ryan O'Malley
- April 11 – Mark Teixeira
- April 12 – Danny García
- April 13 – Joselo Díaz
- April 14 – John Van Benschoten
- April 15 – Yoel Hernández
- April 17 – Max St. Pierre
- April 20 – Chris Duffy
- April 21 – Jeff Keppinger
- April 22 – Carlos Hernández
- April 23 – Yosuke Hiraishi
- April 25:
  - Mike Rouse
  - Kazuhito Tadano
- April 26 – Mike Wood
- April 29 – Kelly Shoppach
- April 30 – Mark Saccomanno

=== May ===
- May 5 – Chad Bentz
- May 8 – Jason Davis
- May 10 – Craig Brazell
- May 11 – Roy Corcoran
- May 12 – Felipe López
- May 15 – Josh Beckett
- May 18:
  - Juan Domínguez
  - Luis Terrero
- May 20 – Austin Kearns
- May 22:
  - Ruddy Lugo
  - Chad Tracy
- May 24 – Justin Hampson
- May 25 – Scott Hairston
- May 26 – Sean Barker
- May 29 – Cha Seung Baek

=== June ===
- June 3 – Tjerk Smeets
- June 6 – Matt Belisle
- June 9 – Mike Fontenot
- June 10 – Jeff Bennett
- June 11 – Yhency Brazobán
- June 15 - Erik Kratz
- June 16 – Dewon Brazelton
- June 18 – Tommy Watkins
- June 21 – Sendy Rleal
- June 22 – Luis Maza
- June 24 – Doug Bernier
- June 26 – Chris Shelton
- June 27 – Luis Rodríguez
- June 30 – Todd Linden

=== July ===
- July 1 – Nelson Cruz
- July 2:
  - Nyjer Morgan
  - Jermaine Van Buren
- July 3 – John Koronka
- July 7 – John Buck
- July 10 – Jesse Foppert
- July 12 – Brad Eldred
- July 15:
  - Reggie Abercrombie
  - Jung Bong
  - Chris Denorfia
  - Nick Neugebauer
- July 17 – Justin Knoedler
- July 21:
  - Kyuji Fujikawa
  - CC Sabathia
- July 23 – Dallas McPherson
- July 25:
  - Santiago Casilla
  - Shawn Riggans
- July 26 – Jason Botts
- July 27 – Félix Díaz
- July 29 – Ryan Braun
- July 30 – Edwin Moreno

=== August ===
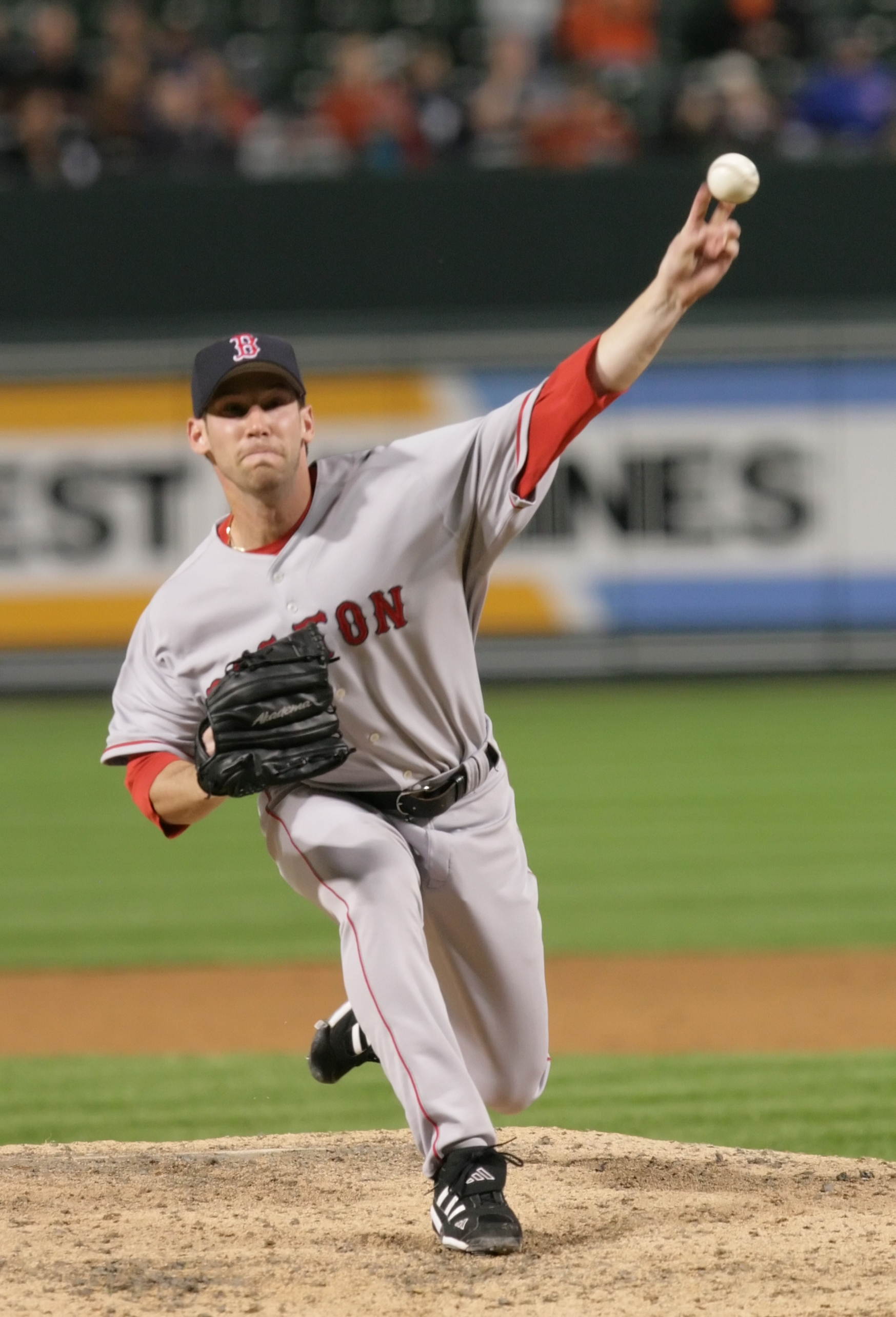
Craig Breslow

- August 6 – Mark Ripperger
- August 8:
  - Craig Breslow
  - Jack Cassel
- August 11 – Kurt Birkins
- August 13 – Jonah Bayliss
- August 15 – Mel Stocker
- August 16:
  - Ryan Hanigan
  - Ben Kozlowski
- August 17:
  - Brett Myers
  - Michael O'Connor
  - Jeff Ridgway
  - Chris Waters
- August 18 – Jason Perry
- August 19 – Lance Cormier
- August 23:
  - Denny Bautista
  - Marcus McBeth
  - Pat Strange
- August 24 – Kevin Correia
- August 25 – Neal Musser
- August 26 – Brendan Harris
- August 28:
  - T. J. Beam
  - Ryan Madson
- August 30:
  - Russ Adams
  - Roberto Hernández

=== September ===
- September 4 – Pat Neshek
- September 7 – Mark Prior
- September 9 – Todd Coffey
- September 11 – Matt DeSalvo
- September 12:
  - Sean Burroughs
  - Maicer Izturis
  - Kevin Richardson
- September 13 – Daisuke Matsuzaka
- September 17 – Danny Haren
- September 19:
  - Ryan Roberts
  - Ray Sadler
- September 23 – Mike Gosling
- September 24 – Levale Speigner
- September 28:
  - Chris Demaria
  - Francisco Rosario
- September 29:
  - Miguel Asencio
  - Dewon Day
- September 30 – Bryan Bullington

=== October ===
- October 1 – Chad Orvella
- October 9 – Mark McLemore
- October 10 – Noah Lowry
- October 18 – Shane Komine
- October 19:
  - José Bautista
  - Rajai Davis
- October 20 – José Veras
- October 21:
  - Troy Cate
  - Jon Coutlangus
- October 23 – Pedro Liriano
- October 25 – Clint Nageotte
- October 27 – Kelvin Jiménez
- October 30:
  - Mike Jacobs
  - Laynce Nix
  - Toshiya Sugiuchi
- October 31 – Jeff Albert

=== November ===
- November 6 – Mike Thompson
- November 8 – Víctor Marte
- November 14 – Sean Tracey
- November 18 – C. J. Wilson
- November 21 – Hank Blalock
- November 22 – Jonny Gomes
- November 23 – Jonathan Papelbon
- November 24 – Jeff Salazar
- November 25 – Nick Swisher
- November 29 – Brian Wolfe
- November 30 – Shane Victorino

=== December ===
- December 2 – Eric Reed
- December 4 – Gustavo Chacín
- December 6 – Ehren Wassermann
- December 9 – Fred Lewis
- December 11 – Joe Blanton
- December 16 – Josh Hall
- December 17 – Dale Thayer
- December 20 – Luke Carlin
- December 21 – Royce Ring
- December 22 – Reid Gorecki
- December 23 – Cody Ross
- December 27 – Jason Repko
- December 31 – Jesse Carlson

== Deaths ==
=== January ===
- January 2:
  - Kenny Hogan, 77, pinch runner and outfielder who played four MLB games during brief trials with 1921 Cincinnati Reds and 1923–1924 Cleveland Indians.
  - George Lees, 84, catcher in 20 games for 1921 Chicago White Sox.
- January 3 – Bob Geary, 88, pitcher in 35 total games for 1918–1919 Philadelphia Athletics and 1921 Cincinnati Reds.
- January 4 – Foster Edwards, 76, pitcher who appeared in 56 games for the 1925–1928 Boston Braves and 1930 New York Yankees.
- January 6 – June Gilmore, 57, All-American Girls Professional Baseball League player.
- January 8 – Harvey Russell, 92, catcher and pinch hitter who appeared in 134 career games for the 1914–1915 Baltimore Terrapins of the "outlaw" Federal League.
- January 10 – Hughie Critz, 79, second baseman for the Cincinnati Reds and New York Giants who led NL in fielding four times and double plays three times.
- January 13 – Charlie Sproull, 61, pitcher who posted a 4–10 won–lost record (5.94 ERA) in 34 games for the wartime 1945 Philadelphia Phillies.
- January 21:
  - Clyde Barnhart, 84, Pittsburgh Pirates left fielder and third baseman (1920–1928); member of 1925 world champions whose 114 regular-season runs batted in, and five World Series RBI, helped lead Bucs to the title.
  - Gene Rye, 73, outfielder for the 1931 Boston Red Sox.
- January 24 – Buck Etchison, 64, first baseman and pinch hitter who appeared in 119 games for the 1943–1944 Boston Braves.
- January 26:
  - Napoleon Hairston, 67, outfielder for the 1938 Pittsburgh Crawfords of the Negro National League.
  - Frank Rosso, 58, who pitched in two games for the New York Giants in the closing days of the wartime 1944 season.
- January 31 – Ed Head, 62, pitcher who compiled a 27–23 won–lost mark with the Brooklyn Dodgers in 118 games spanning five seasons between 1940 and 1946.

=== February ===
- February 1:
  - Greg Mulleavy, 74, shortstop who played in 78 games for the Chicago White Sox (1930 and 1932) and in one contest for the Boston Red Sox (1933); later, coached for Brooklyn/Los Angeles Dodgers between 1957 and 1964 and served as a longtime Dodger scout.
  - Fred Walters, 67, catcher for the 1945 Red Sox, and one of many players who only appeared in the majors during World War II.
- February 2 – Jack Rothrock, 74, center fielder for four different teams from 1925 to 1937, who led the victorious St. Louis Cardinals with six RBI in the 1934 World Series.
- February 4 – Dud Branom, 82, first baseman who played in 30 games for the 1927 Philadelphia Athletics.
- February 14 – Jelly Jackson, 70, shortstop/second baseman for the Cleveland Red Sox (1934) and Homestead Grays (1935–1940, 1944–1945) of the Negro National League.

=== March ===
- March 1:
  - Emmett Ashford, 65, the major leagues' first black umpire, who worked in the American League from 1966 to 1970 and in the 1970 World Series.
  - Arndt Jorgens, 74, Norwegian-born backup catcher for the New York Yankees who played 11 seasons (1929–1939) behind Hall of Famer Bill Dickey; member of five World Series championship teams but never once appeared in a Fall Classic.
  - Johnny Watwood, 74, center fielder and first baseman who played in 469 games between 1929 and 1939 for the Chicago White Sox, Boston Red Sox and Philadelphia Phillies.
- March 3 – Jerry Priddy, 60, second baseman who played from 1941 to 1953 for the New York Yankees, Washington Senators, St. Louis Browns and Detroit Tigers.
- March 5 – Les Fleming, 64, first baseman and outfielder who appeared in 434 games for the Cleveland Indians (1939, 1941–1942 and 1945–1947) and Pittsburgh Pirates (1949).
- March 9 – Tom Baker, 45, left-hander who pitched in ten games for the 1963 Chicago Cubs.
- March 11 – Stan Klopp, 69, relief pitcher who appeared in 24 games for the wartime-era 1944 Boston Braves.
- March 14 – Al Wickland, 92, outfielder/pinch hitter in 444 games for five teams in three leagues (largely for Chicago and Pittsburgh of the "outlaw" Federal League) from 1913 to 1915 and in 1918–1919.
- March 17 – Bob Hooper, 57, Canadian-born pitcher who worked in 194 games for the Philadelphia Athletics, Cleveland Indians and Cincinnati Redlegs from 1950 to 1955.
- March 22 – Ray Foley, 73, pitch hitter in two games for the 1928 New York Giants.
- March 27 – Lou Knerr, 58, pitcher for 1945–1946 Philadelphia Athletics and 1947 Washington Senators; co-led American League hurlers in games lost (16) in 1946.

=== April ===
- April 3:
  - Bob Linton, 77, catcher/pinch hitter who appeared in 17 games for the 1929 Pittsburgh Pirates.
  - Bob Trowbridge, 49, pitcher who hurled in 116 games for the 1956–1959 Milwaukee Braves and 1960 Kansas City Athletics; member of 1957 World Series champions.
- April 7 – Buck Canel, 74, Spanish-language broadcaster of 42 World Series, as well as many years of New York Yankees games.
- April 9 – Ed Morgan, 75, first baseman and right fielder for the 1928–1933 Cleveland Indians and 1934 Boston Red Sox; batted .313 in 771 games and drove in 136 runs in 1930, sixth in the American League.
- April 12 – Mel Preibisch, 65, outfielder who got into 16 games for Boston Bees/Braves of 1940–1941; later a scout.
- April 17
  - Hooks Iott, 60, left-handed pitcher and 16-year veteran of the minors who appeared in 26 games during two MLB seasons as a member of the St. Louis Browns (1941 and 1947) and New York Giants (1947).
  - Ed Miller, 91, first baseman and pinch hitter who played in 86 career games for the Browns (1912, 1914) and Cleveland Indians (1918).
- April 19 – Sid Gautreaux, 67, catcher and pinch hitter in 86 games for the 1936–1937 Brooklyn Dodgers.
- April 21:
  - Ray Dobens, 73, pitcher in 11 games for the 1929 Boston Red Sox.
  - Joe Page, 62, three-time All-Star southpaw relief pitcher for the New York Yankees (1944–1950) who set single-season record with 27 saves in 1949, and led AL in saves and appearances twice each; two-time (1947, 1949) world champion and 1949 World Series MVP.
- April 24:
  - Dink Mothell, 82, catcher/second baseman/utility man who played all nine positions during his Negro leagues career (1920 to 1932); stalwart member of 1920s Kansas City Monarchs.
  - Beryl Richmond, 72, left-handed hurler who worked in ten total games for the 1933 Chicago Cubs and 1934 Cincinnati Reds.
- April 25 – Cliff Lee, 83, outfielder and .300 lifetime hitter who played in 521 games from 1919 to 1926 for four clubs, principally the Philadelphia Phillies.
- April 28 – Bob Porterfield, 56, All-Star and The Sporting News AL Pitcher of the Year in 1953 after a 22–10 season with the Washington Senators; also pitched for New York Yankees, Boston Red Sox, Pittsburgh Pirates and Chicago Cubs over his 12-year (1948–1959) career.
- April 27 – Rube Ehrhardt, 85, relief pitcher who worked in 193 games for the Brooklyn Robins and Cincinnati Reds between 1924 and 1929.

=== May ===
- May 1 – George Woodend, 62, relief pitcher who appeared in three early-season contests for the 1944 Boston Braves.
- May 6 – Harry Sweeney, 64, World War II-era first baseman who appeared in one MLB game, on October 1, 1944, for the Pittsburgh Pirates.
- May 16 – Cap Peterson, 37, outfielder who played from 1962 to 1969 for the San Francisco Giants, Washington Senators and Cleveland Indians.
- May 21 – Frank Croucher, 65, infielder for the Detroit Tigers and Washington Senators in the 1930s and 1940s.
- May 25 – Jesse Brown, 65, left-hander who pitched in the Negro National League between 1938 and 1944.

=== June ===
- June 1 – Rube Marquard, 93, Hall of Fame pitcher (1908–1925) who retired with 201 wins and the NL record for career strikeouts by a left-hander (1,593); posted 19 consecutive wins for the 1912 New York Giants for a modern major league record.
- June 3 – Fred Lieb, 92, sportswriter who covered every World Series from 1911 to 1958.
- June 5 – Jimmie Keenan, 81, left-hander who pitched in 16 total games for the 1920–1921 Philadelphia Phillies.
- June 9 – Odell Hale, 71, infielder for the Cleveland Indians in the 1930s, who hit .300 three times and collected two 100-RBI seasons.
- June 11 – Rube Marshall, 89, pitcher who hurled in 64 games for the 1912–1914 Philadelphia Phillies, then made 21 mound appearances for the 1915 Buffalo Blues of the "outlaw" Federal League.
- June 12 – Danny Thomas, 29, outfielder for the Milwaukee Brewers from 1976 to 1977.
- June 14 – Johnny Hodapp, 74, second baseman and third baseman in 791 games for the Cleveland Indians (1925–1932), Chicago White Sox (1932) and Boston Red Sox (1933); led AL in hits (225) and doubles (51) in 1930.
- June 25 – Joe Muir, 57, southpaw who pitched in 21 games for the 1951–1952 Pittsburgh Pirates.
- June – Henry Spearman, 70, third baseman who appeared for six Negro National League clubs, notably the Philadelphia Stars and Homestead Grays, between 1936 and 1945, and batted .302 lifetime.

=== July ===
- July 1 – Curt Coleman, 93, third baseman who played in 12 games for the New York Highlanders during the early weeks of the 1912 campaign.
- July 4 – Jack Martin, 93, shortstop who played from 1912 to 1914 for the Highlanders, Boston Braves and Philadelphia Phillies.
- July 5 – Ben Tincup, 87, member of original and modern Cherokee Nation and pitcher in pro ball for 27 seasons spanning 1912 to 1942, including 48 MLB games for Phillies (1914–1915, 1918) and Chicago Cubs (1928); coach for 1940 Brooklyn Dodgers and longtime instructor and scout.
- July 6 – Walt Craddock, 48, left-handed hurler who went 0–7 (6.49 ERA) in 29 appearances for the Kansas City Athletics (1955–1956, 1958).
- July 8 – Wenty Ford, 33, Bahamian pitcher who appeared in four games for the 1973 Atlanta Braves.
- July 16 – Ernie Vick, 80, catcher in 57 career games for the St. Louis Cardinals (1922, 1924–1926); reserve with 1926 World Series champion Redbirds.
- July 23 – Wally Snell, 91, catcher for the 1913 Boston Red Sox, who later went on to a distinguished career as a college botany professor and athletic coach at Brown University for four decades.
- July 30 – Joe Lucey, 83, pitcher/infielder who played 13 games for the New York Yankees and Boston Red Sox between 1920 and 1925.

=== August ===
- August 1 – Bill McKinley, 70, American League umpire from 1946 to 1965 who officiated in 2,976 regular-season games, plus four World Series and three All-Star games.
- August 3 – Bill Hubbell, 83, pitcher who appeared in 204 games between 1919 and 1925 for three NL clubs, principally the Phillies.
- August 4 – Lefty Jamerson, 80, pitcher for the 1924 Boston Red Sox.
- August 8:
  - Allan Collamore, 93, pitcher who worked in 40 total games for Philadelphia (1911) and Cleveland (1914–1915) of the American League.
  - Henry Henderson, 75, first baseman for the 1932 Nashville Elite Giants of the Negro Southern League.
- August 13 – Tom Miller, 83, outfielder by trade who pinch hit in nine MLB games for the 1918–1919 Boston Braves.
- August 17 – Jonah Goldman, 73, shortstop/third baseman in 148 total games for the Cleveland Indians (1928, 1930–1931).
- August 20 – Al Hermann, 81, outfielder who played in 32 games for the Boston Braves in 1923 and 1924.
- August 22 – Columbus Vance, 75, pitcher and occasional outfielder who appeared in the Negro leagues between 1927 and 1933.
- August 24 – Herman Fink, 69, pitcher who fashioned a 10–20 (5.22) career record in 67 games for the 1935–1937 Philadelphia Athletics.
- August 27 – John Wilson, 77, pitched briefly for the Red Sox from 1927 to 1928.
- August 28 – Harry Smythe, 75, left-handed pitcher who worked in 60 total games for the Philadelphia Phillies (1929–1930), New York Yankees (1934) and Brooklyn Dodgers (1934); pitched in pro baseball for 22 seasons.

=== September ===
- September 1 – Hank LaManna, 61, pitcher/outfielder who appeared in 45 career contests for Boston of the National League from 1940 to 1942.
- September 6 – Gus Ketchum, 83, pitched in six games for the 1922 Philadelphia Athletics.
- September 10 – Honey Lott, 55, outfielder/second baseman for the 1948 New York Black Yankees of the Negro National League.
- September 11:
  - Junius Bibbs, 69, infielder who played in the Negro leagues between 1933 and 1944, then became a biology teacher and athletics coach in Indianapolis for 25 years; member, Indiana Baseball Hall of Fame.
  - Garth Mann, 64, pitcher whose 12-year professional baseball career included one MLB game as a pinch runner for the Chicago Cubs on May 14, 1944.
- September 12 – Ole Olsen, 86, Cornell University graduate and World War I veteran who pitched in 54 games for the 1922–1923 Detroit Tigers.
- September 13 – Charlie Pechous, 83, third baseman who played in 53 games for the 1915 Chicago Whales (Federal League) and 1916–1917 Chicago Cubs.
- September 18:
  - Fredda Acker, 54, All-American Girls Professional Baseball League player, who was named Mrs. America in 1947.
  - Leo Tankersley, 79, catcher who played a single MLB game on July 2, 1925, as a member of the Chicago White Sox.
- September 22 – Tommy Neill, 60, outfielder and pinch hitter who played 20 games for 1946–1947 Boston Braves.
- September 24:
  - Bill Ayers, 60, pitcher who appeared in 13 games for the New York Giants between April and July 1947.
  - Ernie Shore, 89, pitcher for New York Giants (1912), Boston Red Sox (1914–1917) and New York Yankees (1919–1920) whose career was curtailed by World War I military service; on June 23, 1917, he relieved Babe Ruth, ejected by the umpires, with a man on first and none out in the first inning, and proceeded to retire the runner and all 26 remaining batters.
- September:
  - Mack Eggleston, 83 or 84, catcher/outfielder/third baseman who played in the Negro leagues and appeared in 509 games between 1920 and 1934.
  - Walter Lee Hardy, 54, shortstop who played in the Negro leagues between 1944 and 1950; later, a business partner of Roy Campanella.

=== October ===
- October 1 – Pat Veltman, 74, utility player who played for four MLB teams over six seasons spanning 1926 to 1934.
- October 8 – Lloyd Johnson, 69, Pittsburgh Pirates' left-hander who hurled one inning of scoreless relief in his only MLB appearance on April 21, 1934.
- October 27 – Frank Loftus, 82, pitcher who worked one inning of one MLB game on September 26, 1926, for the Washington Senators against the Chicago White Sox.

=== November ===
- November 6 – Leroy Morney, 71, All-Star shortstop who played for 11 Negro leagues teams between 1932 and 1944; batting champion (.378) of the 1932 Negro Southern League.
- November 8 – Dale Jones, 61, pitcher who appeared in two games for 1941 Philadelphia Phillies.
- November 17:
  - Eppie Barnes, 79, first baseman and pinch hitter in four games for 1923–1924 Pittsburgh Pirates.
  - Hersh Martin, 71, outfielder who played in 607 games for the 1937–1940 Philadelphia Phillies and 1944–1945 New York Yankees; 1938 National League All-Star.
- November 19 – Jack Gilligan, 95, pitcher in 12 games for 1909–1910 St. Louis Browns.
- November 25 – Art Jones, 74, pitcher who appeared in one MLB game and one inning for the Brooklyn Dodgers on April 23, 1932.
- November 27 – "Wild Bill" Connelly, 55, pitcher who appeared in 25 career games for four clubs, notably the New York Giants, between 1945 and 1953.
- November 29 – Bill Dunlap, 71, outfielder for the Boston Braves from 1929 to 1930.

=== December ===
- December 4 – Georgette Vincent, 52. who pitched for two All-American Girls Professional Baseball League champion teams spanning 1951–1952.
- December 7:
  - Lennie Pearson, 62, six-time Negro National League All-Star outfielder/first baseman who spent almost all of his career with the Newark Eagles (1937–1948); 1942 NNL Triple-Crown winner and member of 1946 Negro World Series championship team.
  - Luke Urban, 93, catcher/pinch hitter who was 40 years old when he made his rookie MLB debut; appeared in 50 total games for the 1927–1928 Boston Braves.
- December 9:
  - Ted Olson, 68, Dartmouth graduate who pitched in 18 games for the 1936–1938 Boston Red Sox.
  - Don Padgett, 68, catcher/outfielder who appeared in 699 career games for the St. Louis Cardinals, Brooklyn Dodgers, Boston Braves and Philadelphia Phillies between 1937 and 1948, missing four full years while serving in World War II; batted .399 in 233 at bats for 1939 Cardinals.
- December 10 – Rosy Ryan, 82, key pitcher on pennant-winning New York Giants teams of early 1920s; led National League in ERA in 1922 and games pitched in 1923, and won World Series rings in 1921–1922; later, a longtime minor league executive.
- December 14 – Elston Howard, 51, twelve-time All-Star catcher for the New York Yankees from 1955 to August 3, 1967, who was that team's first black player; 1963 American League MVP and two-time Gold Glove winner; also coached for Yanks from 1969 to 1979 and won six World Series rings between 1956 and 1978; Yankees posthumously retired his #32 uniform in 1984; finished playing career with the Red Sox, helping them win 1967 AL pennant.
- December 20 – Mike Knode, 80, outfielder/second baseman who played 42 games for 1942 St. Louis Cardinals who previously starred in football for the University of Michigan; elder brother of Ray Knode.
- December 22 – Earl Grace, 73, left-handed-hitting catcher who appeared in 627 career games for Chicago Cubs (1929, 1931), Pittsburgh Pirates (1931–1935) and Philadelphia Phillies (1936–1937).
- December 24 – Bob Habenicht, 54, relief pitcher who worked in four total games for the 1951 St. Louis Cardinals and 1953 St. Louis Browns.
- December 26:
  - Bill Crouch, 73, pitcher who twirled in 50 MLB games for the 1939 Brooklyn Dodgers, 1941 Philadelphia Phillies, and 1941 and 1945 St. Louis Cardinals.
  - Johnny Oulliber, 69, outfielder for 1933 Cleveland Indians, appearing in 22 games.
- December 30 – Stuffy Stewart, 86, reserve second baseman and utility player in 176 games for eight seasons for four teams, notably the Washington Senators, between 1916 and 1929.
- December 31:
  - Jim Britt, 70, play-by-announcer for the Boston Braves (1940–1952) and Red Sox (1940–1950), Cleveland Indians (1954–1957), and the Mutual Radio Network.
  - Bob Shawkey, 90, pitcher who had four 20-win seasons for the New York Yankees between 1916 and 1922 and won 195 MLB games overall; led AL in ERA (2.45) in 1920; managed Yankees for 1930 season, essentially between terms of Hall of Fame pilots Miller Huggins and Joe McCarthy; later, head baseball coach at Dartmouth College (1952–1956).
