= Marcus Aurelius Arnheiter =

U.S. Navy officer (1925–2009)

- Born: November 8, 1925; New York City, New York, U.S.
- Died: August 18, 2009 (aged 83); Novato, California, U.S.
- Military career
- Allegiance: United States
- Branch: United States Navy
- Service years: 1948–1971
- Rank: Lieutenant Commander
- Unit: United States Pacific Fleet
- Commands: USS Vance (DER-387)
- Conflicts: Vietnam War

Marcus Aurelius Arnheiter (November 8, 1925 – August 18, 2009, in Novato, California), was a U.S. Navy officer, known for being relieved of command of USS Vance (DER-387) after only 99 days.

== Early life and education ==
Arnheiter was born to Theodore and Dorothy B. Arnheiter. He had a twin brother, Theodore Jr. (died 2005), and a sister, Dorothy. Raised in New York City, he was graduated from the United States Naval Academy in 1952 and obtained his master's degree from Georgetown.

== USS Vance (DER-387) ==
On December 22, 1965, just before Christmas, on Bravo Pier, Pearl Harbor, Hawaii, Arnheiter took command of the USS Vance, a ship which was, in his opinion, unready for war. Having found it, in his words, "crawling with cockroaches", he instituted measures to get the ship cleaned up, to get the crew trained, and to institute activities which he thought would get the crew motivated.

Arnheiter also had more than his share of personality quirks, which led members of the crew to keep a "Mad Marcus Log".

One of the duties of the Vance was to search small coastal traffic (junks) for contraband, specifically weapons to be used by the Viet Cong in South Vietnam. Since the Vance's motor whaleboat was lacking in speed, Arnheiter had a speedboat purchased for that purpose; however, he used special services (welfare & recreation) money—a misappropriation of funds. Arnheiter also had the navigation personnel falsify the logs when he ordered the Vance closer to the coast than his orders allowed.

Eventually word of these activities (and other allegations), including the complaints listed in the "Mad Marcus Log", reached higher command headquarters staff, most likely by way of a chaplain in whom the sailors had confided.

Three months after he assumed command, headquarters ordered the Vance to Manila for refitting. On March 31, 1966, Arnheiter was summarily relieved.

In an attempt to clear his name, Arnheiter sought a court martial from the Navy, but the Navy never took any additional action against him. Although he then swore out formal charges against the Navy, Arnheiter was not so much as reprimanded for charging that two- and three-star admirals had themselves been guilty of gross violations of the Uniform Code of Military Justice. Arnheiter said that, either way, he should be the subject of a court martial—for his alleged actions on the Vance or for his related charges against selected superior officers. The Navy ignored his requests. Arnheiter went so far as to participate in formal congressional hearings on the matter, and still the Navy ignored his demands for redress in any official capacity. On repeated appeals, his case was dismissed.

According to a Time magazine article, one officer admitted: "We all have a little of the Captain Queeg in us ... But Arnheiter had more than his share."

The incident damaged the career of one Captain Richard Alexander, who had selected and patronized Arnheiter; Alexander had been destined as captain of the reactivated battleship USS New Jersey (BB-62), but was at the last minute replaced with Captain J. Edward Snyder.

== Suppressed book ==
Journalist Neil Sheehan wrote a book titled The Arnheiter Affair in 1971, including a little-known indicium that Arnheiter, prior to his enrollment in the Naval Academy, had briefly been enrolled in the United States Military Academy at West Point, New York. The Arnheiter Affair was well received. Litigation, however, brought by Arnheiter for libel and slander caused the book to be removed from print. Retired U.S. Air Force astronaut Frank Borman, USMA Class of 1950, confirms in his autobiography that Arnheiter was a member of the same cadet company (H-1), and that Arnheiter had been expelled from West Point, only to be subsequently admitted to the Naval Academy.

== See also ==
- The Caine Mutiny
