= 1980 Senior League World Series =

American youth baseball tournament

Tournament information
- Location: Gary, Indiana
- Dates: August 18–23, 1980

Final positions
- Champions: Pingtung, Taiwan
- Runner-up: Kaneohe, Hawaii

The 1980 Senior League World Series took place from August 18–23 in Gary, Indiana, United States. Pingtung, Taiwan defeated Kaneohe, Hawaii in the championship game. It was Taiwan's ninth straight championship.

== Teams ==
United States	International
(Pennsylvania) Berwick, Pennsylvania East	Thunder Bay, Ontario Canada
(Illinois) Chicago, Illinois North	(Italy) Aviano, Italy; Aviano Air Base; Europe
(Texas) Houston, Texas South	(Taiwan) Pingtung, Taiwan Far East
(Hawaii) Kaneohe, Hawaii West	(Venezuela) Maracaibo, Venezuela Latin America

== Results ==
Upper round 1	Upper round 2	Upper final	Championship
—	Illinois	16
—	Italy	0
1–0	Illinois	4
1–0	Taiwan	8
—	Taiwan	4
—	Pennsylvania	0
2–0	Taiwan
2–0	Venezuela
—	Texas	4
—	Canada	3
1–0	Texas	1
1–0	Venezuela	3
—	Hawaii	0
—	Venezuela	1	3–0	Taiwan	12	—
4–1	Hawaii	4	—
Lower round 1	Lower round 2	Lower round 3	Lower final
1–1	Texas	0
0–1	Italy	4	1–1	Pennsylvania	3	2–1	Venezuela	1
0–1	Pennsylvania	7	2–1	Pennsylvania	3	3–1	Hawaii (F/12)	4
2–1	Hawaii	4
1–1	Illinois	5
0–1	Canada	1	1–1	Hawaii	6
0–1	Hawaii	9

1980 Senior League World Series Champions
Pingtung, Taiwan
