= Vance (given name) =

- Pronunciation: UK: /ˈvæn(t)s, ˈvɑːn(t)s/ US: /ˈvæn(t)s/
- Gender: Masculine
- Language: English

Vance is a masculine given name, a transferred use of an English surname meaning “dweller of the marshland.” It ranked among the top 1,000 names given to newborn American boys during the 20th and early 21st centuries. It declined in popularity after 2024. The name has fallen out of fashion. Some parents might also be reluctant to name a son after a prominent political figure such as American vice-president JD Vance.

It may refer to:

== People ==
- Vance Amory (1949–2022), Premier of Nevis
- Vance Bourjaily (1922–2010), American novelist, playwright, journalist and essayist
- Vance D. Brand (born 1931), NASA astronaut
- Vance Breese (1904–1973), American aviation engineer and test pilot
- Vance DeGeneres (born 1954), American musician, actor and comedian.
- Vance Dixon (1901–?), American musician
- Vance Hartke (1919–2003), American politician
- Vance Johnson (born 1963), American retired National Football League player and long jumper
- Vance Joy (born 1987), Australian singer songwriter
- Vance Law (born 1956), American Major League Baseball former player and former head baseball coach at Brigham Young University
- Vance McAllister (born 1974), American politician
- Vance C. McCormick (1872–1946), American politician and businessman
- Vance Packard (1914–1996), American author
- Vance Palmer (1885–1959), Australian writer
- Vance Randolph (1892–1980), American folklorist and author
- Vance Rodriguez, hiker who was found dead in Florida in 2018
- Vanče Šikov (born 1985), Macedonian footballer
- Vance Wilson (born 1973), American retired Major League Baseball catcher
- Vance Worley (born 1987), American Major League Baseball pitcher
- Vance Archer, ring name of pro wrestler Lance Hoyt

== Fictional characters ==
- Vance Astro, Marvel Comics superhero born Vance Astrovik
- Vance Astrovik, Marvel Comics superhero formerly known as Marvel Boy
- Vance Parker, a character from the 1981 musical satire film Shock Treatment

== See also ==
- Vance (surname)
