= Judy Vance =

American mechanical engineer

Judy M. Vance is an American mechanical engineer known for her research on the use of virtual reality and haptic technology in design and manufacturing. She is a professor emerita of mechanical engineering and the former Joseph C. and Elizabeth A. Anderlik Professor of Engineering at Iowa State University.

== Education and career ==
Vance is originally from Fort Dodge, Iowa. She was a student of mechanical engineering at Iowa State University, beginning in 1973. After taking several years away from school, she earned a bachelor's degree in 1980, a master's degree in 1987, and a Ph.D. in 1992.

She joined the Iowa State faculty in 1984, as an instructor in the Division of Engineering Fundamentals and Multidisciplinary Design, and became an assistant professor in 1987. On completing her doctorate in 1992, she instead became an assistant professor of mechanical engineering. She was promoted to associate professor in 1997 and full professor in 2003. She chaired the mechanical engineering department from 2003 to 2006, and was named Joseph C. and Elizabeth A. Anderlik Professor of Engineering in 2010. She was the first woman in the mechanical engineering department with a tenure-track faculty position, the first to win tenure, and the first to chair the department. She retired as a professor emerita in 2019.

== Recognition ==
Vance was elected as a Fellow of the American Society of Mechanical Engineers in 2004. In 2012, Heriot-Watt University gave her an honorary doctorate, "for her preeminence in, and outstanding innovative contribution to, advancing virtual reality engineering design applications, as well as for her influence as an advocate to promote the participation of women in engineering". On her retirement, a scholarship at Iowa State was named in her honor.
