= Ada Reedy Vance =

American poet (1840–1896)

Ada Reedy Vance (née, Reedy; ca. 1840 – no sooner than 1896) was an American poet of the Southern United States. Her writings were characterized as being southern in manner and spirit.

== Early life and education ==
Sallie Ada Reedy was born in northern Alabama about 1840. (Note: According to Alderman (1910), Vance was born in Mississippi.) Captain James Reedy, her father, removed to Lexington, Mississippi, during her infancy.

From an early age, Vance enjoyed studying and reading. She had a liberal education and traveled extensively in the U.S., having visited most places of note between the Canadian border and Texas.

While still a child, she began to write poetry.

== Career ==
She contributed to a large number of newspapers in the southwest, as well as some in the northwest, among these being The Louisville Journal. Before the civil war, her poetry appeared in the literary weeklies of South Carolina, including The Examiner and The Courant, both published at the state capital.

Also before the civil war, Vance's poem, "Charity", went the rounds of U.S. newspapers, credited to the London Journal. It was assumed to be English, and was appreciated accordingly. Its reflective character was thought to indicate mature, if not advanced age in its author. But the history of this poem is noteworthy. The editor of the Jackson Mississippian gave it during the poem's early notoriety. It had been published originally, and under the author's full name, in his paper. It had made its way somehow to England, and was reproduced there as an original contribution to the London Journal. It was upon its return to the U.S. that it went the rounds of the press so extensively. The author who received this compliment, was then a teenager, Miss Sallie Ada Reedy, of Lexington, Mississippi.

In addition to "Charity", other well-known poems are: "Death by the Wayside", a lyric tragedy related to the death of an only brother; and "The Sisters", an allegorical lyric. In 1860, her poems were collected for publication in book form. The civil war caused the idea to be abandoned for more auspicious times.

In 1865, about the close of the war, she married Mr. Vance (died December 1868), of Kentucky, and resided in Lexington, Mississippi.

Around 1869, Vance worked on a novel with the theme of "love". This theme, without being original, was considered well suited to the author's mental nature.

From Mississippi, Vance removed first to Kentucky and, by 1896, to Arkansas.

== Style ==
An intuitive sense of melody, rather than rigid art-study, rendered her versification in musical style. Her later productions bore evidence of stricter culture in verse-art. The character of Vance's poetry was subjective. Her melody of versification was considered remarkable. Her versification was easy and musical. Of her style, J. Wood Davidson wrote thus:—

"There breathes in all her writings an impassioned devotion, intense and pure, with a simplicity tender and graceful. This is the true region of emotional poet-life-the human in its warmest aspiration for the supra-human ideal. Her genius is vigorous, and at the same time exquisitely feminine-looking down upon life's struggling waters from woman's headland of catholic charity. Mystery-the nameless and never told-often lends a spell, dreary yet delicious, to her muse. But this characteristic is always subordinate to the wealth of her creative faculty."

== Selected works ==
- "Charity"
- "Death by the Wayside"
- "Guard Thine Action"
- "Strauss' First Love "
- "The Bridal"
- "The Sisters"
- "The Two Angels"
