= Walter Lee Hardy =

American baseball player

- Shortstop
- Born: December 1, 1925; Lakeland, Florida, U.S.
- Died: September, 1980; Rockland County, New York, U.S.
- Batted: Right Threw: Right

Negro league baseball debut
- 1944, for the New York Black Yankees

Last appearance
- 1950, for the Kansas City Monarchs
- Stats at Baseball Reference

Teams
- New York Black Yankees (1944–1948); New York Cubans (1949); Kansas City Monarchs (1950)

Walter Lee Hardy (December 1, 1925 – September, 1980) was an American Negro league shortstop in the 1940s.

A native of Lakeland, Florida, Hardy was known as a flashy fielder, but a weak batter. Following his Negro league career, he continued to play throughout the early 1950s for the Saint-Jean Canadiens of the Provincial League.

After his playing career, Hardy became a business partner of Baseball Hall of Famer Roy Campanella, and died in Rockland County, New York in 1980 at age 54.
