= Columbus Vance =

American baseball player

- Pitcher
- Born: May 8, 1905; Jackson, Mississippi, U.S.
- Died: August 22, 1980 (aged 75); Bogalusa, Louisiana, U.S.
- Batted: Both Threw: Right

Negro league baseball debut
- 1927, for the Birmingham Black Barons

Last appearance
- 1935, for the Homestead Grays

Teams
- Birmingham Black Barons (1927, 1930); Homestead Grays (1932, 1935); Indianapolis ABCs (1932–1933); Birmingham Black Barons (1934)

Columbus Vance (May 8, 1905 – August 22, 1980) was an American Negro league baseball pitcher between 1927 and 1934.

A native of Jackson, Mississippi, Vance made his Negro leagues debut with the Birmingham Black Barons in 1927. He went on to play for the Homestead Grays and Indianapolis ABCs before finishing his career back with the Grays in 1935. Vance died in Bogalusa, Louisiana in 1982 at age 75.
