= Joseph Vance (priest) =

Anglican priest

Joseph Vance was an Anglican priest in Ireland in the second half of the 19th century and the first decades of the 20th.

Vance was educated at Trinity College, Dublin and ordained deacon in 1868, and priest in 1869. Vance spent his whole career at Rathronan. He was Archdeacon of Limerick from 1913 until 1918.
