= USS Vance =

United States warship

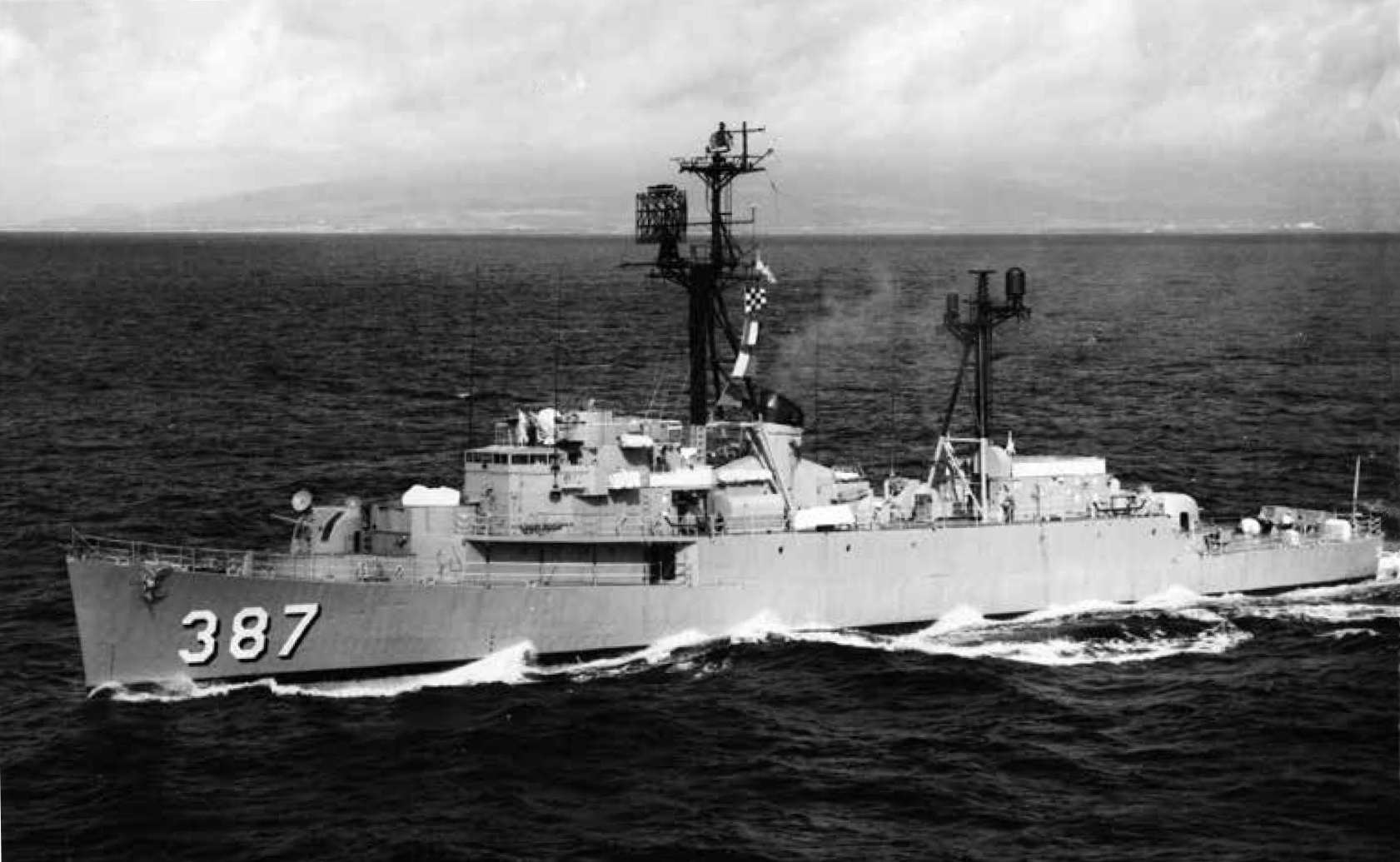
- USS Vance (DER-387), 26 November 1967.

History

United States
- Name: USS Vance (DE-387)
- Namesake: Joseph Williams Vance, Jr.
- Builder: Brown Shipbuilding, Houston, Texas
- Laid down: 30 April 1943
- Launched: 16 July 1943
- Commissioned: 1 November 1943
- Decommissioned: 10 October 1969
- Reclassified: DER-387, 21 October 1955
- Stricken: 1 June 1975
- Fate: Sunk as target, 1985

United States
- Name: USCGC Vance (WDE-487)
- Commissioned: 9 May 1952
- Decommissioned: 16 June 1954
- Fate: Returned to USN, 16 June 1954

General characteristics
- Class & type: Edsall-class destroyer escort
- Displacement: 1,253 tons standard; 1,590 tons full load
- Length: 306 feet (93.27 m)
- Beam: 36.58 feet (11.15 m)
- Draft: 10.42 full load feet (3.18 m)
- Propulsion: 4 FM diesel engines, 4 diesel-generators, 6,000 shp (4.5 MW), 2 screws
- Speed: 21 knots (39 km/h)
- Range: 9,100 nmi. at 12 knots; (17,000 km at 22 km/h)
- Complement: 8 officers, 201 enlisted
- Armament: 3 × single 3 in (76 mm)/50 guns; 1 × twin 40 mm AA guns; 8 × single 20 mm AA guns; 1 × triple 21 in (533 mm) torpedo tubes; 8 × depth charge projectors; 1 × depth charge projector (hedgehog); 2 × depth charge tracks

USS Vance (DE-387) was an Edsall-class destroyer escort, named after Joseph Williams Vance Jr.

== Namesake ==
Joseph Williams Vance Jr. was born on 4 December 1918 in Memphis, Tennessee. He enlisted in the Naval Reserve on 26 July 1940 as an apprentice seaman. After serving at sea on the USS Arkansas during the late summer and early fall, he was appointed midshipman on 22 November and reported to Prairie State (IX-15) for further training.

Commissioned ensign on 28 February 1941, Vance joined USS Parrott in the Philippine Islands on 16 April. Soon after the Japanese attacked Pearl Harbor on 7 December (8 December west of the date line), Parrott joined the American-British-Dutch-Australian effort to stem the Japanese tide sweeping down from the north.

During the 24 January 1942 Battle of Makassar Strait, Vance was in charge of the destroyer's 12-tube battery of 21-inch torpedo tubes—in effect the ship's "main battery." On 23 January, DesDiv 58 began a final approach to the town of Balikpapan, Borneo, captured only that day by the Japanese. On 24 January, in the initial phase of the Battle of Makassar Strait, three of Parrott's torpedoes sank the 3,500-ton transport Sumanoura Maru. Within minutes, Parrott teamed up with USS Pope and USS Paul Jones to sink Tatsukami Maru with torpedoes. For his gallantry during the first action, Vance was awarded the Bronze Star. He remained on Parrott through the spring, when he was promoted to lieutenant (junior grade) on 15 June 1942.

As Allied forces gathered for the assault on Japanese-held Guadalcanal, Vance received orders to HMAS Canberra as a liaison officer with the Royal Australian Navy. On 8 August, the Australian cruiser helped to screen American transports off the landing beaches. That night, Canberra was sunk in the Battle of Savo Island, and Vance was killed in action.

== History ==
Vance (DE-387) was laid down on 30 April 1943 at Houston, Tex., by the Brown Shipbuilding Co., launched 16 July 1943, sponsored by Mrs. Joseph W. Vance, mother of the late Lt. (jg.) Vance, and commissioned on 1 November 1943.

Following shakedown off Bermuda, Vance became the flagship for Escort Division (CortDiv) 45, a Coast Guard-staffed unit, and convoyed a group of oil tankers from Norfolk, Va., to Port Arthur, Tex., and back. Upon its return to Norfolk, it served as a training ship for destroyer escort crews while awaiting the arrival of the rest of its division.

In February 1944, the ship conducted local escort operations before joining the New York section of Convoy UGS-33, bound for Gibraltar. Its section rendezvoused off Norfolk with the remainder of the convoy and its flagship, Bibb (WPG-32), and set out across the Atlantic. On 7 March, Vance departed Casablanca with GUS-33 for the return voyage and put into the New York Navy Yard on 23 March for availability.

Vance next got underway on 12 April with the other ships of CortDiv 45 and a destroyer escort division to screen the 102 merchantmen of convoy UGS-39 to Tunisia. Arriving at Bizerte on 3 May, the warship left Tunisian waters eight days later, bound for New York with GUS-39. Off Oran on 14 May, a German U-boat slipped through the screen of escorts and torpedoed two merchantmen. Vance, holding the "whip" position of the screen (where the ship had the duty of shepherding stragglers) came up through the convoy, sighted the periscope, and attempted to ram. The U-boat "pulled the plug" and dove deeper, evading the onrushing escort's sharp bow. Vance remained on the scene for 10 hours, subjecting the U-boat to depth charge and hedgehog attacks, until relieved by a squadron of Navy destroyers. Three days later, after an extensive hunt, the relief ships sank U-616.

Altogether, Vance made eight round-trip voyages to the western Mediterranean and followed each with availability at either Boston or New York. Four times the ship engaged in training exercises out of Casco Bay, sharpening the crew's antisubmarine and gunnery skills. On 14 July 1944, Vance helped to fight off a German air attack against an Allied convoy off Oran. During most of the voyages, the destroyer escort held the "whip" position in the convoy, a grueling and sometimes frustrating detail since merchantmen frequently displayed a lack of discipline and straggled behind the convoy. Carrying the division doctor on board, Vance on occasion would take on board men from other ships for medical treatment.

On 2 May 1945, Vance departed New York with its last Mediterranean-bound convoy. On the morning of 11 May, four days after Germany had surrendered, Vance sighted a light up ahead in the convoy and rang down full speed to investigate. Upon closing on the light, the destroyer escort discovered a surfaced U-boat, U-873, which had been at sea for 50 days. When the submarine began to run, Vance hailed the erstwhile enemy in German by bullhorn, ordering them to heave to. Vance placed a prize crew on board the U-boat who sailed it to Portsmouth, New Hampshire, on 16 May.

Vance then underwent alterations to its antiaircraft armament and soon got underway for the Pacific. However, it arrived too late to participate in anything but training operations and returned to the east coast for decommissioning. In mid-October 1945, it underwent a pre-deactivation availability before proceeding south to Green Cove Springs, Fla. On 27 February 1946, Vance was decommissioned and placed in reserve.

== Postwar refit ==
The ship remained in "mothballs" for the next six years, (Vance was USCGC WDE-487 from April, 1952 to 3 April 54) before it was towed to the Mare Island Naval Shipyard in November 1955 for conversion to a radar picket destroyer escort. The extensive alterations involved the addition of: improved air-search radar, extensive communications equipment, and complete facilities for fighter-direction operations. It also entailed the enclosing of the entire main deck areas amidships to provide accommodations for officers and men. Designated DER-387, Vance was recommissioned on 5 October 1956 at Mare Island.

Between March 1957 and the end of the year, Vance was homeported at Seattle, Wash., as a unit of CortDiv 5 and completed eight patrols on various stations of the Radar Early Warning System in the northern Pacific. Each tour lasted approximately 17 days, and the ship maintained a round-the-clock vigil, with air-search radars, tracking and reporting every aircraft entering or approaching the air space of the northwestern United States. On Labor Day 1957, Vance drew emergency duty—an engineering casualty prevented the assigned ship from going out—and got underway in a fast 75 minutes. Although it was only staffed at 60 percent of its complement (because many of its officers and men were ashore on leave or liberty and could not be notified in time to return to the ship before it weighed anchor) Vance was deployed for 12 days and completed a successful mission.

On 1 June 1958, the radar picket escort ship's home port was changed to Pearl Harbor; and it began operating with CortRon 7. One month later, it departed Hawaiian waters for a 29-day patrol on the mid-ocean picket lines which provided radar coverage from Alaska to Midway Atoll. Vance thus became the first ship on the Distant Early Warning Line (DEW line) in the Pacific and the first to sail under the newly organized Pacific barrier patrol. In mid-January 1959. following routine overhaul and refresher training at Pearl Harbor, Vance again took station on the mid-Pacific stretch of ocean on its second DEW-line deployment.

Vance continued to conduct regular DEW-line patrols until May 1960, when CortRon 7 was dissolved. At that time, it rejoined CortDiv 5 and served with its old unit into 1961. On occasion, the picket ship took Russian trawlers under surveillance—undoubtedly while the communist vessel was returning the compliment.

Early in 1961, Vance's communications capabilities were extensively augmented during an overhaul at Pearl Harbor. After resuming DEW-line patrols late in the spring, the ship received orders in August 1961 designating it an ocean station vessel with TF-43, Operation "Deepfreeze 62." Temporarily based at Dunedin, New Zealand, Vance served as a communication relay ship for aircraft bringing in vital supplies to the Antarctic stations from New Zealand. The ship remained on station in the cold, bleak, southern waters into March 1962, when it headed home via Melbourne, Australia, and Papeete, Tahiti, to Pearl Harbor. The ship soon resumed duties on the DEW-line and, but for periodic interruptions for maintenance, replenishment, and training, was devoted to the task of operating mainly off the Aleutian Islands through February 1965.

== A new mission ==
In the mid-1960s, with the advent of improved radar and early-warning capabilities, the radar picket escort ship was rapidly approaching obsolescence. However, as the United States stepped up its efforts to aid the South Vietnamese government, the ship received a new lease on life. In Vietnam, a ship of this nature could be invaluable for coastal patrol work. Accordingly, in February 1965, Vance was ordered to the Western Pacific (WestPac). On 25 March 1965, it sailed from Pearl Harbor, in company with USS Brister (DER-327) and USS Forster (DE-334), as Task Group (TG) 52.8, bound for the Philippines.

En route from Subic Bay to waters off the coast of Vietnam, Vance rescued Capt. Leland D. Holcomb, USAF, who had ejected from a burning F-100 Super Sabre fighter plane. Vance took station in Operation Market Time on 11 April 1965. Up until 24 April, it operated near the 17th parallel as a part of Task Unit (TU) 71.1.1 During the assignment, the ship maintained communications between airborne EC-121K and Commander, TU 71.1.1, in USS John W. Thomason (DD-760). Subsequently, from 15 May to 4 June, Vance returned to "Market Time" surface surveillance, this time in the Gulf of Thailand near the border dividing South Vietnam from Cambodia. It operated in company with small minesweepers (MOSs) and embarked a Vietnamese Navy liaison officer to aid in the ship's "visit and search" activities. The crew continued these activities until sailing for Hawaii early in September and arrived at Pearl Harbor on 18 June.

Vance, under the command of Marcus Aurelius Arnheiter, returned to "Market Time" station in mid-January 1966. On 15 January 1967, Vance returned to the Far East for another 7th Fleet deployment and relieved USS Koiner (DE-331) off the mouth of the Saigon River. Once again, Vance's duties involved hunting for craft attempting to infiltrate from the north to deliver their cargoes to the Viet Cong. Vance tracked all ocean-sized vessels and stopped and searched junks and sampans; tedious and frustrating but vital work. Arnheiter was, somewhat notoriously, relieved from command after only 99 days.

The ship conducted two more "Market Time" patrols during its third WestPac deployment and, between missions, underwent a tender availability at Kaohsiung, Taiwan, rest and recreation at Hong Kong and upkeep at Subic Bay. At the end of its last "Market Time" assignment, the ship patrolled the Taiwan Strait between communist China and Taiwan before returning to Pearl Harbor for routine overhaul. In late 1967, the ship began its final WestPac deployment in which its duties were similar to those of its third deployment. It subsequently returned to the west coast of the United States late in 1968 for inactivation.

== Disposition ==
Placed in reserve at the Inactive Ship Facility, Vallejo, Vance was decommissioned on 10 October 1969, struck from the Navy list on 1 June 1975.

The ship was sunk as a target in 1985.

== Awards ==
- Combat Action Ribbon
- American Campaign Medal
- European-African-Middle Eastern Campaign Medal
- World War II Victory Medal
- National Defense Service Medal (1 star)
- Antarctic Service Medal
- Armed Forces Expeditionary Medal
- Vietnam Service Medal (7 campaign stars)
- Republic of Vietnam Gallantry Cross Unit Citation (3 stars)
- Republic of Vietnam Campaign Medal
