= List of 1978 Seattle Mariners draft picks =

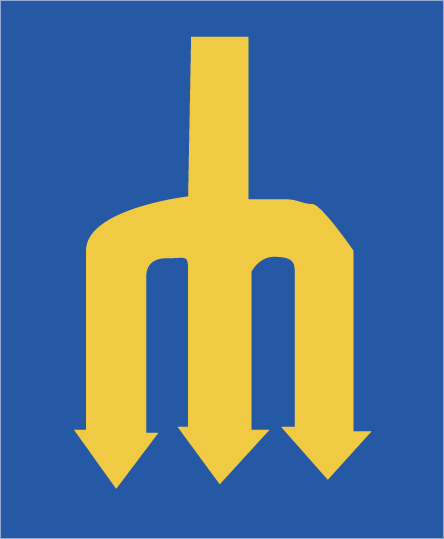
1978 Seattle Mariners draft picks
Information
Owner	Danny Kaye
General Manager(s)	Dick Vertlieb
Manager(s)	Darrell Johnson
First pick	Tito Nanni (Rule 4)
Draft positions	6 (Rule 4)
Number of selections	23 (Rule 4) 34 (total)
Links
Results	The Baseball Cube
Official Site	The Official Site of the Seattle Mariners
Years	1977 • 1978 • 1979

The following is a list of 1978 Seattle Mariners draft picks. The list includes the June regular draft (Rule 4 draft), the June secondary draft, and the January regular draft, and January secondary draft. In all of the drafts, the Mariners made 34 selections, including 12 pitchers, 6 catchers, 5 outfielders, 3 utility players, 3 shortstops, 2 first basemen, 1 infielder, 1 third baseman, and 1 second baseman. Six players drafted by the Mariners in 1978 went on to play in Major League Baseball.

== Drafts ==
=== Key ===
Round (Pick)	Indicates the round and pick the player was drafted
Position	Indicates the secondary/collegiate position at which the player was drafted, rather than the professional position the player may have gone on to play
*	Indicates the player made an appearance in Major League Baseball

=== June regular draft ===
Round (Pick)	Name	Position	School	Ref.
1 (6)	Tito Nanni	First baseman / Outfielder	Chestnut Hill Academy	
2 (32)	Dave Valle	Catcher	Holy Cross High School	
2 (34)	Rich Naumann	Left-handed pitcher	Bay High School	
3 (38)	Rob Simond	Left-handed pitcher	Southern Illinois University	
4 (84)	Ron McGee	Right-handed pitcher	Lincoln High School	
5 (110)	Werner Lajszky	Catcher	Mater Christi High School	
6 (136)	Doug Smith	Right-handed pitcher	University of Oklahoma	
7 (162)	Jack Hobbs	Pitcher	Lynchburg College	
8 (188)	Lazoro Santin	Pitcher	Rochester Adams High School	
9 (214)	Richard Graser	Left-handed pitcher	Fort Vancouver High School	
10 (240)	Bob Stoddard	Right-handed pitcher	Fresno State University	
11 (266)	Vance McHenry	Shortstop	University of Nevada, Las Vegas	
12 (292)	Terry Mixon	Shortstop	Georgia Southern University	
13 (318)	Bill Kampen	Pitcher	—	
14 (344)	Rob Pietroburgo	Left-handed pitcher	University of Missouri	
15 (370)	Harry Mauch	Outfielder	Southern Oregon University	
16 (396)	David Nowland	Shortstop	University of Tulsa	
17 (422)	Michael Guerra	Utility player	University of Nevada, Las Vegas	
18 (448)	Jerry Vasquez	Outfielder	Arizona State University	
19 (473)	Calvin Horhn	Outfielder	Des Moines Area Community College	
20 (497)	Rod Hudson	Catcher	Portland State University	
21 (520)	Dave Edler	Infielder	Washington State University	
22 (542)	Chris Flammang	Utility player	Sierra High School	

=== June secondary draft ===
Round (Pick)	Name	Position	School	Ref.
1 (8)	Gera D. Miller	Utility player	Des Moines Area Community College	
2 (31)	Scott Benedict	Catcher	Palm Beach Community College	

=== January regular draft ===
Round (Pick)	Name	Position	School	Ref.
1 (5)	Jim Maler	First baseman	Miami Dade College	
2 (31)	Anthony Jordan	Right-handed pitcher	Monterey Peninsula College	
3 (57)	Dann Bilardello	Catcher	Cabrillo College	
4 (83)	Kirk Komstadius	Third baseman	Yakima Valley Community College	
5 (107)	Keven Miller	First baseman	Cerritos College	
6 (129)	Teddy Adkins	Right-handed pitcher	Palm Beach Community College	

=== January secondary draft ===
Round (Pick)	Name	Position	School	Ref.
1 (9)	Richard Alexander	Outfielder	—	
2 (35)	Juan Corey	Catcher	Miami Dade College	
3 (57)	Carlos Matamoras	Second baseman	Miami Dade College	

== See also ==
- List of Seattle Mariners first-round draft picks
