= List of 1977 Seattle Mariners draft picks =

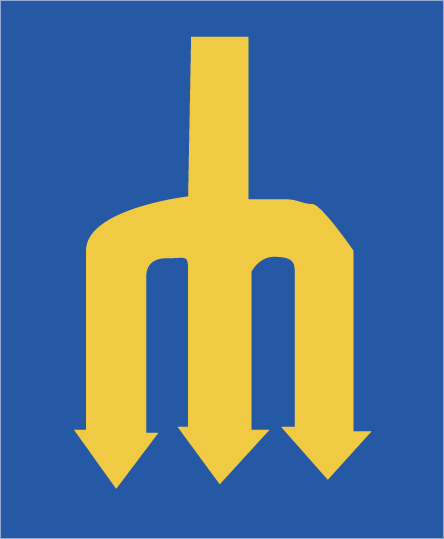
1977 Seattle Mariners draft picks
Information
Owner	Danny Kaye
General Manager(s)	Dick Vertlieb
Manager(s)	Darrell Johnson
First pick	Dave Henderson (Rule 4)
Draft positions	26 (Rule 4)
Number of selections	32 (Rule 4) 45 (total)
Links
Results	The Baseball Cube
Official Site	The Official Site of the Seattle Mariners
Years	1976 • 1977 • 1978

The following is a list of 1977 Seattle Mariners draft picks. The list includes the June regular draft (Rule 4 draft), the June secondary draft, and the January regular draft, and January secondary draft. In all the drafts, the Mariners selected 17 pitchers, 13 outfielders, 4 catchers, 4 shortstops, 3 first baseman, 2 third basemen, 1 second baseman, 1 middle infielder for a combined total of 45 players in all drafts. Six selections by the Seattle Mariners in 1977 went on to play in Major League Baseball.

== Drafts ==
=== Key ===
Round (Pick)	Indicates the round and pick the player was drafted
Position	Indicates the secondary/collegiate position at which the player was drafted, rather than the professional position the player may have gone on to play
*	Indicates the player made an appearance in Major League Baseball

=== June regular draft ===
Round (Pick)	Name	Position	School	Ref.
1 (26)	Dave Henderson	Right-handed pitcher	Dos Palos High School	
2 (52)	Henry Bender	Outfielder	Woodrow Wilson High School	
3 (78)	Bud Anderson	Right-handed pitcher	Rutgers University	
4 (104)	Kyle Koke	Shortstop	South Grand Prairie High School	
5 (130)	Ron Musselman	Right-handed pitcher	Clemson University	
6 (156)	Tony Cameron	Left-handed pitcher	Pepperdine University	
7 (182)	Michael Moore	First baseman	A.C. Davis High School	
8 (208)	Rodney Hobbs	Outfielder	Renton High School	
9 (234)	Tracy Harris	Right-handed pitcher	Washington State University	
10 (260)	John Haley	Outfielder	Anacortes High School	
11 (286)	Bill Latham	Left-handed pitcher	Huffman High School	
12 (312)	Karl Best	Right-handed pitcher	Kent-Meridian High School	
13 (338)	Mark Oestreich	Outfielder	Florida International University	
14 (364)	Tim Hallgren	Right-handed pitcher	Charles F. Adams High School	
15 (390)	Greg Biercevicz	Right-handed pitcher	University of Connecticut	
16 (416)	Tony Phillips	Shortstop	Roswell High School	
17 (441)	Barry Knight	Outfielder	Hillsborough Community College	
18 (466)	Loyd Ard	Right-handed pitcher	Florida International University	
19 (490)	Al Weston	Outfielder	Michigan State University	
20 (514)	Gary McDonnell	Second baseman	Nicholls State University	
21 (538)	Larry Patterson	Third baseman	Gonzaga University	
22 (562)	Calvin King	Shortstop	Southern University at New Orleans	
23 (583)	Rick Ramos	Right-handed pitcher	Lewis University	
24 (608)	Thomas Bloemke	Right-handed pitcher	University of Missouri	
25 (629)	Jack Hills	Pitcher	California State University, Los Angeles	
26 (650)	Scott Miller	Outfielder	University of South Florida	
27 (668)	Del Curtis	Outfielder	Central Arizona College	
28 (684)	Larry Eiler	Left-handed pitcher	Arizona State University	
29 (697)	Rick Santarone	Catcher	Cherry Hill High School	
30 (708)	Tom Fitzgerald	Pitcher	Florida International University	
31 (719)	Juan Corey	Outfielder	Central High School	
32 (730)	John Jordan	Catcher	Mount Saint Joseph College	

=== June secondary draft ===
Round (Pick)	Name	Position	School	Ref.
1 (25)	Rodolfo Arias	Catcher	Miami Dade College	

=== January regular draft ===
Round (Pick)	Name	Position	School	Ref.
1 (24)	Paul Givens	Left-handed pitcher	Fresno City College	
2 (50)	Mark Schuster	First baseman	Central Arizona College	
3 (76)	Jeff Cary	Right-handed pitcher	Pensacola Junior College	
4 (101)	Dan Townsend	Outfielder	Yavapai College	
5 (122)	Alphonso Eiland	Shortstop	Palomar College	
6 (141)	Don Keener	Third baseman	Chipola College	
7 (158)	Glen Moon	Outfielder	—	
8 (172)	Porter Wyatt	Outfielder	Palomar College	
9 (184)	Michael Tice	Outfielder	Georgia Perimeter College	
10 (195)	James Hall	Middle infielder	—	

=== January secondary draft ===
Round (Pick)	Name	Position	School	Ref.
1 (26)	Dominic Antonini	Catcher	Rowan University	
2 (45)	John Evans	First baseman	Los Angeles Harbor College	

== See also ==
- List of Seattle Mariners first-round draft picks
