= John Mahnen =

John Mahnen was the president of the Amsterdam Crusaders American Football Club.

== Early life ==
Born in 1964 in Toledo, Ohio, John holds a Bachelor of Arts degree in economics from Kent State University where he was a student trainer and a member of the Lacrosse team. He received his MBA from Nijenrode University in 1990.

== Career ==
John has over twenty years experience in the field of sports operations and marketing. After earning his MBA from Nijenrode in 1990, he worked for the official European merchandiser of Major League Baseball and the National Football League as well many European football clubs.

He was a member of an interest group that successfully lobbied the National Football League to locate a team in Amsterdam for the World League of American Football. In 1994, he was hired by the National Football League for the Amsterdam organisation as Manager of Football Operations. He was responsible for setting up the organization of a professional football team in Amsterdam. He also worked on sales, promotion, public relations and football development activities. He had the good fortune to work with a mentor for many years who himself had been a General Manager of several professional teams in the US: Dick Vertlieb. John left the Admirals after the first season to work in the field of telecommunications but continued to assist the organisation in sponsoring, ticket sales and grassroots development. He also assisted in the production of the Dutch broadcasts of NFL football.

While working in the field of telecommunications, John continued to volunteer his time in the sport of American Football. As Team Manager and subsequently President of the AFC Amsterdam Crusaders he has planned, organised and executed well over 100 football games.

In 2007, John joined a group of professionals in the consulting group HEG. He is currently active in a number of sports activities including cycling, corporate sporting events and sustainable stadium design. In June 2009 he organised a Sumo exhibition for the Japanese Chamber of Commerce in the Netherlands and in March 2010, he helped to produce the conference "The Future of Sports" for the Club of Amsterdam.

He is also an active game official, a member of the EFAF Rules and Regulations committee, and an Ehrenmitglied of the Kiel Baltic Hurricanes e.V. (First head coach in 1989).
