= Don Richman =

American sports executive

Don Richman (1931 — 8 November 1986) was an American sports executive and script writer. He was a key figure in the creation of the Seattle SuperSonics in 1967, the first professional team to play in the Northwest region of the United States.

== Early life and education ==
Richman was born in 1931 and spent his childhood in Hartford, Connecticut. For his post-secondary education, he went to Vanderbilt University and the University of Southern California. While he was at USC, Richman was a sports information director from 1956 to 1959.

== Biography ==
After graduating from USC, Richman created a public relations company with Al Davis in 1960. During his PR career, he came up with the name of the Los Angeles Chargers when the team was established. Richman decided to name the Chargers after team owner Barron Hilton's credit card company Carte Blanche. The following year, Richman left the Chargers in 1961 to work in television.

When the team moved to San Diego the following year, he remained in Los Angeles to become a TV script writer. As a script writer, he wrote for various television shows including The Farmer's Daughter, The Donna Reed Show and The Rat Patrol during the 1960s. Years later, security analyst Dick Vertlieb (who like Richman was a graduate from the University of Southern California) approached him about trying to achieve the dream of running a professional franchise. They set their eye on the National Basketball Association with its low entry fee ($1.75 million in 1965) that aimed at finding a city with a quality arena and willing investors. It was their third city of focus (after Cleveland, Ohio and Pittsburgh, Pennsylvania fizzled out) that ultimately worked out. Having heard of the recent purchase of the Chargers by a consortium that had Gene Klein and Sam Schulman, the group called them up. They later met face-to-face. Despite hearing that neither Klein or Schulman had all the money needed for the team, the two guided them to merely serve as the front men by paying the $100,000 performance bond while Vertlieb and Richman would raise money to help cover the $1.75 million. The Seattle SuperSonics were thus formed on January 11, 1967 as an expansion team for the NBA, with Richman as their general manager and Vertlieb as business manager. It was he who hired Al Bianchi as the first head coach. However he soon became restless and yearned to go back to California (while appreciating the locale, he once described Seattle as a "24-hour car wash") and engage with writing again. Richman served as GM from 1967 to 1968 before deciding to give the reins to Schulman. Richman stepped down as the SuperSonics general manager in May 1968 and was replaced by Dick Vertlieb. He continued working with the basketball team as a consultant after leaving his executive position.

After leaving the SuperSonics, Richman moved from sports to join a Los Angeles advertising company owned by Chuck Blore. Richman had worked with Blore's company earlier in his career when he was a screenwriter during the early 1960s. Outside of radio, Richman sang with television writer Mal Sharpe as one half of The Brothers Sincere in the late 1960s.

== Awards ==
In 1983, Richman and Blore won multiple Clio Awards in radio advertising for multiple companies including Roy Rogers Restaurants and AT&T.

== Death ==
On November 8, 1986, Richman died in Los Angeles.
