= Seattle SuperSonics =

American professional basketball team, 1967–2008

- Conference: Western (1970–2008)
- Division: Western (1967–1970); Pacific (1970–2004); Northwest (2004–2008)
- Founded: 1967
- History: Seattle SuperSonics; 1967–2008; Oklahoma City Thunder; 2008–present
- Arena: Seattle Center Coliseum/KeyArena at Seattle Center (1967–1978, 1985–1994, 1995–2008); Kingdome (1978–1985); Tacoma Dome (1994–1995)
- Location: Seattle, Washington
- Team colors: Green, gold, white
- General manager: Full list
- Head coach: Full list
- Ownership: Sam Schulman (1967–1983); Barry Ackerley (1983–2001); Basketball Club of Seattle (Howard Schultz, Chairman) (2001–2006); Professional Basketball Club LLC (Clay Bennett, Chairman) (2006–2008)
- Championships: 1 (1979)
- Conference titles: 3 (1978, 1979, 1996)
- Division titles: 6 (1979, 1994, 1996, 1997, 1998, 2005)
- Retired numbers: 6 (1, 10, 19, 24, 32, 43)
| Home | Road | Alternate |

The Seattle SuperSonics (commonly shortened to Sonics) were an American professional basketball team based in Seattle. The SuperSonics competed in the National Basketball Association (NBA) as a member of the Western Division (1967–1970), and later as a member of the Western Conference's Pacific (1970–2004) and Northwest (2004–2008) divisions. After the 2007–08 season ended, the team moved to Oklahoma City, where it plays as the Oklahoma City Thunder.

Sam Schulman owned the team from its 1967 inception until 1983. It was then owned by Barry Ackerley until 2001, when it came under ownership of Basketball Club of Seattle, headed by Starbucks chairman emeritus, former president and CEO Howard Schultz. On July 18, 2006, Basketball Club of Seattle sold the SuperSonics and its Women's National Basketball Association (WNBA) sister franchise, the Seattle Storm to Professional Basketball Club LLC, headed by Oklahoma City businessman Clay Bennett. The NBA Board of Governors approved the sale on October 24, 2006, and finalized it seven days later, at which point the new ownership group took control. After failing to find public funding to construct a new arena in the Seattle area, the SuperSonics moved to Oklahoma City before the 2008–09 season, after a $45 million settlement with the city of Seattle to pay off their existing lease at the KeyArena at Seattle Center before it expired in 2010.

The SuperSonics played their home games at KeyArena (originally the Seattle Center Coliseum) for 33 of the franchise's 41 seasons in Seattle. In 1978, the team moved to the Kingdome, which they shared with Major League Baseball (MLB) team Seattle Mariners and National Football League (NFL) team Seattle Seahawks. The team returned to the Coliseum in 1985, and temporarily moved to the Tacoma Dome for the 1994–95 season while the Coliseum was renovated and renamed KeyArena.

The SuperSonics won the NBA championship in 1979. The franchise won Western Conference titles in 1978, 1979 and 1996; and six divisional titles—their last being in 2005—five in the Pacific Division and one in the Northwest Division. The franchise attained a 1,745–1,585 (.524) regular season win–loss record, as well as a 107–110 (.493) playoff win–loss record during its time in Seattle. Both marks would rank in the top half of the NBA's all-time standings.

Settlement terms of a lawsuit between the city of Seattle and Clay Bennett's ownership group stipulated SuperSonics' banners, trophies and retired jerseys remain in Seattle; the nickname, logo and color scheme are available to any subsequent NBA team that plays in Seattle, subject to NBA approval.

== History ==
=== 1966–1968: Team creation ===
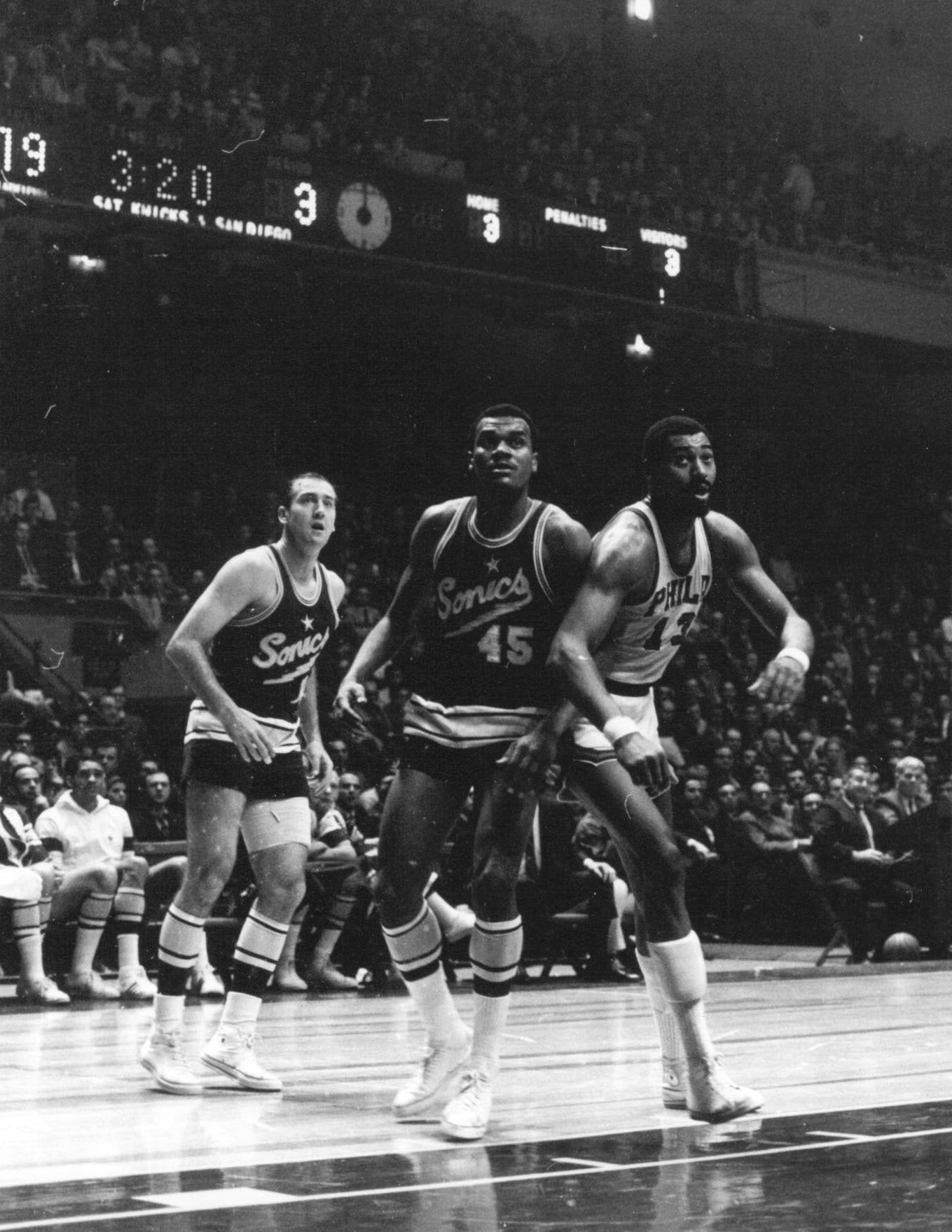
Tom Meschery, Bob Rule (SuperSonics) and Wilt Chamberlain (Philadelphia 76ers) in 1967

In the early 1960s, security analyst Dick Vertlieb and script writer Don Richman talked to each other about their mutual dreams of running a professional franchise. The two set their eye on the National Basketball Association (NBA) with its low entry fee ($1.75 million in 1965), then set out finding a city with a quality arena and willing investors. Seattle was their third city of focus after Cleveland and Pittsburgh fizzled out. Having heard of the recent purchase of the San Diego Chargers by a consortium that had Gene Klein and Sam Schulman, the group called them up. They later met face-to-face. Despite hearing that neither Klein or Schulman had all the money needed for the team, the two guided them to merely serve as the front men by paying the $100,000 performance bond while Vertlieb and Richman would raise money to help cover the $1.75 million. On December 20, 1966, Los Angeles businessmen Sam Schulman and Eugene V. Klein, both of whom owned the AFL side San Diego Chargers, and a group of minority partners were awarded an NBA franchise for Seattle, the first major-league sports franchise in the city. The name of SuperSonics came on January 11, 1967, as an expansion team for the NBA, with Richman as their general manager and Vertlieb as business manager. It was Richman who hired Al Bianchi as the first head coach. The two left Seattle by 1969, while Schulman served as the active partner and head of team operations named the team SuperSonics as a nod to the city's ties to the aviation industry, with Boeing's having recently been awarded a contract for an SST project.

The Seattle SuperSonics began play on October 13, 1967; they were coached by Al Bianchi, and included All-Star guard Walt Hazzard and All-Rookie Team members Bob Rule and Al Tucker. The expansion team debuted in San Francisco with a 144–116 loss in their first game against the San Francisco Warriors. On October 21, the Seattle team's first win came against the San Diego Rockets in overtime 117–110, and the SuperSonics finished the season with a 23–59 record.

=== 1968–1974: The Lenny Wilkens era ===
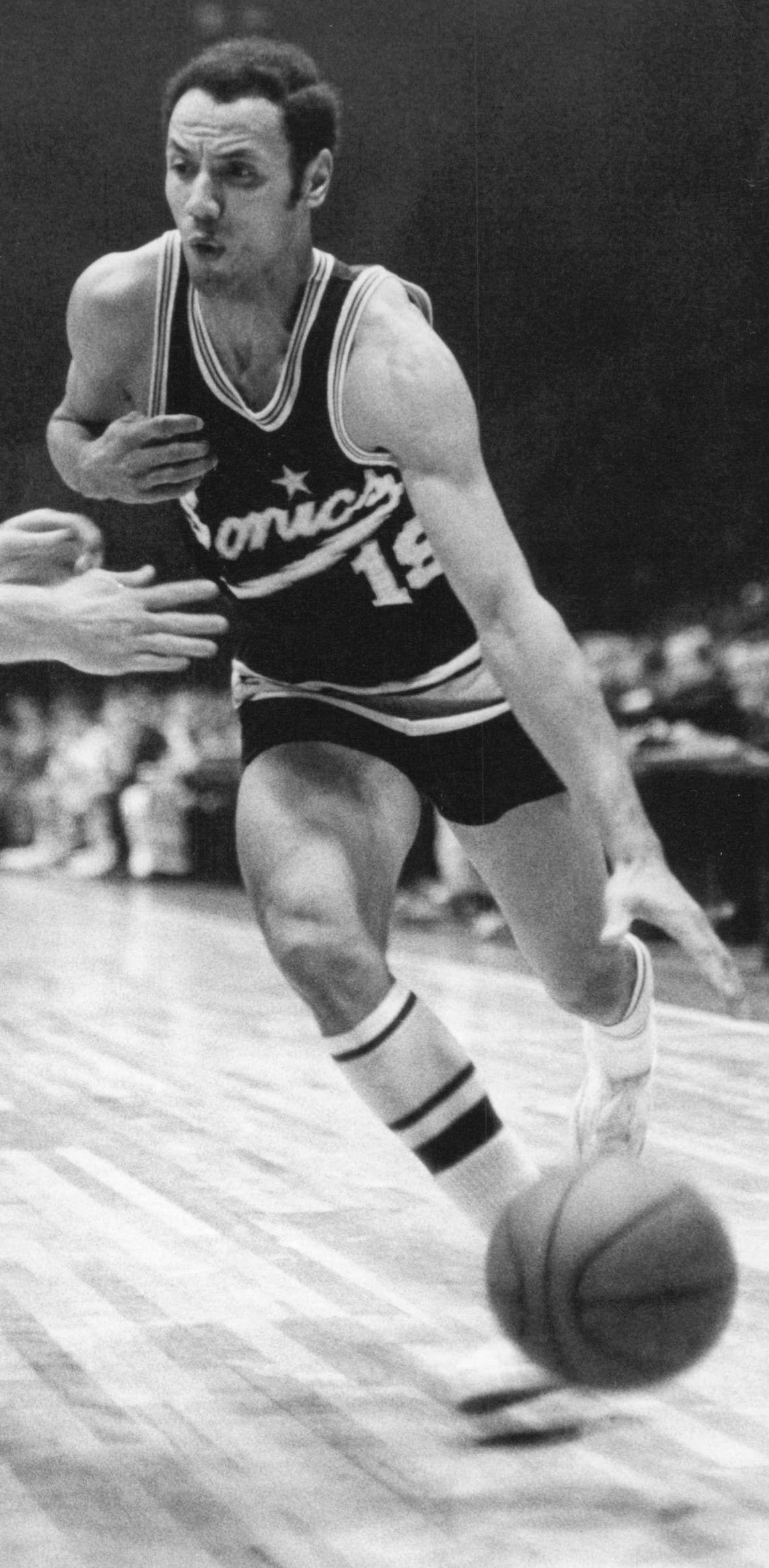
Lenny Wilkens in 1968

Before the start of the next season, Hazzard was traded to the Atlanta Hawks for Lenny Wilkens, who brought a strong, all-around game to the SuperSonics, averaging 22.4 points, 8.2 assists and 6.2 rebounds per game for the SuperSonics in the 1968–69 season. Rule improved on his rookie statistics with 24.0 points per game and 11.5 rebounds per game. The SuperSonics won only 30 games and Bianchi was replaced by Wilkens as player/coach during the off-season.

Wilkens and Rule both represented Seattle in the 1970 NBA All-Star Game, and Wilkens led the NBA in assists during the 1969–70 season. In June 1970, the NBA owners voted 13–4 to work toward a merger with the ABA; Schulman, a member of the ABA–NBA merger committee in 1970, was eager to merge the leagues and he publicly announced if the NBA did not accept the merger agreement, he would move the SuperSonics to the ABA; he also threatened to move his soon-to-be ABA team to Los Angeles to compete with the Lakers. The Oscar Robertson suit delayed the merger and the SuperSonics remained in Seattle. Early in the 1970–71 season, Rule tore his left Achilles' tendon and was injured for the rest of the season.

==== Arrival of Spencer Haywood ====
Wilkens was named the 1971 All-Star Game MVP. Schulman was awarded American Basketball Association Rookie of the Year and MVP Spencer Haywood following a lengthy court battle. The following season, the SuperSonics had their first winning season, finishing 47–35. On March 3, 1972, the team, which was led by player-coach Wilkens and First Team forward Haywood, held a 46–27 mark but late-season injuries to starters Haywood, Dick Snyder and Don Smith led to the team losing eight of its final nine games.

For the 1972–73 season, Wilkens was traded to the Cleveland Cavaliers in an unpopular move; without his leadership, the SuperSonics fell to a 26–56 record. One of the highlights of the season was Haywood's second-consecutive All-NBA First Team selection; he averaged a SuperSonics record 29.2 points per game and collected 12.9 rebounds per game.

=== 1974–1983: Postseason success and championship season ===
Bill Russell was hired as the head coach in 1974, and he led the SuperSonics to the playoffs for the first time. The team, which featured Haywood, guards Fred Brown and Slick Watts, and rookie center Tommy Burleson, defeated the Detroit Pistons in a three-game mini-series before losing to the eventual champion Golden State Warriors in six games. The next season, the SuperSonics traded Haywood to the New York Knicks, forcing the remaining players to pick up the offensive slack. Guard Fred Brown, now in his fifth season, was selected to the 1976 NBA All-Star Game, and finished fifth in the league in scoring average and free-throw percentage. Burleson's game continued to strengthen as Watts led the NBA in assists and steals, and was named to the All-NBA Defensive First Team. The SuperSonics again made the playoffs but lost to the Phoenix Suns in six games, in spite of strong performances from Brown (28.5 ppg) and Burleson (20.8 ppg).

Russell left the SuperSonics after the 1976–77 season, and the team started the season at 5–17 under new coach Bob Hopkins. Lenny Wilkens was brought back to replace Hopkins, and the team's performance immediately improved. The SuperSonics won 11 of their first 12 games under Wilkens, finished the season at 47–35, won the Western Conference title, and led the Washington Bullets three games to two before losing in seven games in the 1978 NBA Finals. Center Marvin Webster went to New York but the SuperSonics' roster stayed largely intact during the off-season, and they won their first division title in 1979. In the playoffs, the SuperSonics defeated the Phoenix Suns in a seven-game conference final series to set up a rematch with the Washington Bullets in the finals, in which the Bullets lost to the SuperSonics in five games to give the SuperSonics their first-and-only NBA title. The championship team roster included Gus Williams and Finals MVP Dennis Johnson, second-year All-Star center Jack Sikma, forwards John Johnson and Lonnie Shelton, and key reserves Fred Brown and Paul Silas.

In 1980, the Seattle SuperSonics' total attendance exceeded that of all other sports or shows held in the Kingdome.

The 1979–80 season saw the SuperSonics finish second in the Pacific Division to the Los Angeles Lakers with a strong 56–26 record. That season, the SuperSonics set an NBA record with a regular season average attendance of 21,725 fans per game, a record that has since broken. Fred Brown won the NBA's first three-point shooting-percentage title, Jack Sikma played in the second of his seven career All-Star Games for the SuperSonics, Gus Williams and Dennis Johnson were named to the All-NBA Second Team, and Johnson was also named to the All-NBA First Defensive Team for the second consecutive year. The SuperSonics made it to the Western Conference Finals for the third consecutive season but lost to the Lakers in five games.

It was the last time the backcourt of Williams and Johnson played together on the SuperSonics; Johnson was traded to Phoenix Suns before the start of the 1980–81 season and Williams missed the year due to a contract dispute. As a result, the SuperSonics fell to last place in the Pacific Division with a 34–48 mark, the only time they finished in last place. Williams returned for the 1981–82 season and the SuperSonics scored 52–30 and 48–34 records during the next two years.

In 1981, the SuperSonics created the Sonics SuperChannel, the first sports subscription cable service; subscriptions were available for $120 ($1.33 a game) but the service shut down after the 1984–85 season.

=== 1983–1989: A period of decline ===
In October 1983, original team owner Sam Schulman sold the SuperSonics to Barry Ackerley. In 1984, Fred Brown retired after playing 13 productive seasons with the SuperSonics; during this time, he had been on the same team roster as Rule and Wilkens during his rookie season, playing a key role on Seattle's first playoff teams, and being the team's important sixth man during the championship series years. In recognition of his contributions to the team, Brown's number was retired in 1986. Lenny Wilkens left the organization after the 1984–85 season and Jack Sikma, the last-remaining member of the SuperSonics' championship team aside from trainer Frank Furtado, was traded after the 1985–86 season.

Among the few SuperSonics highlights in the latter half of the 1980s were Tom Chambers' 1987 All-Star Game MVP award, the SuperSonics' appearance in the 1987 Western Conference Finals, despite posting a 39–43 regular season record during the 1986–87 season, and the performances of Chambers, Xavier McDaniel and Dale Ellis. In 1987–88, the three players each averaged over 20 points per game with Ellis at 25.8 ppg, McDaniel at 21.4, and Chambers at 20.4. In the 1988–89 season, Chambers had signed with Phoenix, Ellis improved his scoring average to 27.5 points per game and finished second in the league in three-point percentage. The SuperSonics finished with a 47–35 record and qualified for the second round of the 1989 playoffs.

=== 1989–1998: The Payton–Kemp era ===
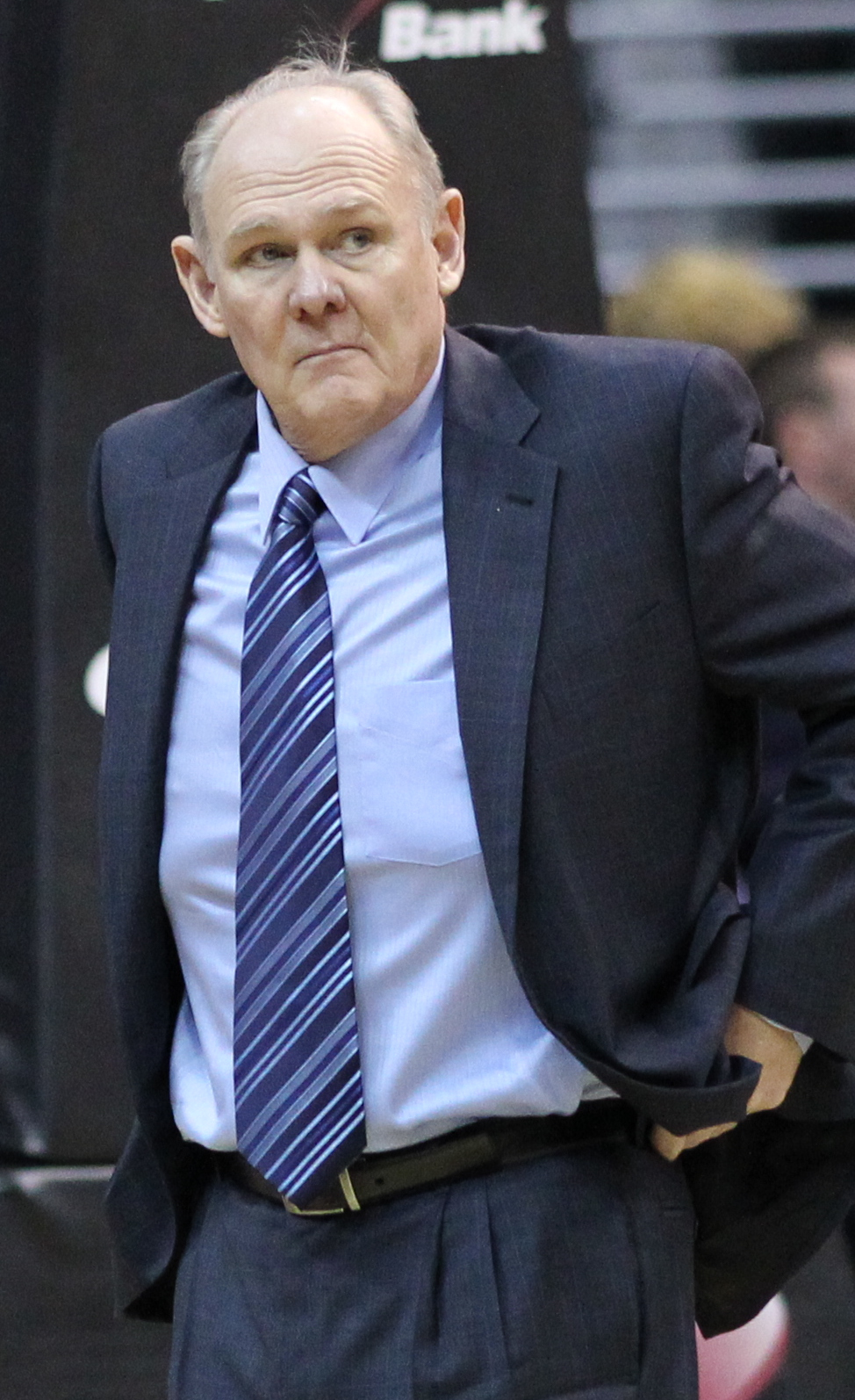
George Karl served as Seattle's head coach from 1992 to 1998.

The SuperSonics began setting a new foundation with the drafting of forward Shawn Kemp in 1989 and guard Gary Payton in 1990, and the trading of Dale Ellis and Xavier McDaniel to other teams during the 1990–91 season. It was George Karl's arrival as head coach in 1992, however, that marked a return to regular season and playoff competitiveness for the SuperSonics. With the continued improvement of Gary Payton and Shawn Kemp, the SuperSonics posted a 55–27 record in the 1992–93 season and took the Phoenix Suns to seven games in the Western Conference Finals.

In the 1993–94 season, the SuperSonics had the best record in the NBA at 63–19, but suffered a first round loss to the Denver Nuggets, becoming the first number one seed to lose a playoff series to an eighth seed. The Sonics moved to the Tacoma Dome for the 1994–95 season while the Coliseum underwent renovations and went on to earn a second place 57–25 record. Again, the Sonics were eliminated in the first round, this time to the Los Angeles Lakers in four games. The team returned to the rebuilt Coliseum, now the KeyArena, for the 1995–96 season.

Perhaps the strongest roster the SuperSonics ever had was the 1995–96 team, which had a franchise best 64–18 record. With a deep roster of All-NBA Second Team selections Kemp and Payton, forward Detlef Schrempf, forward Sam Perkins, guard Hersey Hawkins, and guard Nate McMillan, the team reached the 1996 NBA Finals, but lost to the Michael Jordan-led Chicago Bulls in six games. Seattle continued to be a Western Conference powerhouse during the next two seasons, winning 57 games in 1996–97 and 61 games in 1997–98 for their second and third straight Pacific Division titles. At the end of the 1997–98 season, longtime Sonic and defensive specialist McMillan retired, and disagreements with management led Karl to end his tenure as head coach. He was replaced by former Sonic Paul Westphal for the 1998–99 season.

=== 1998–2008: A decade of struggles ===
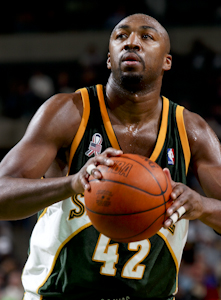
Vin Baker was an NBA All-Star with the SuperSonics during the 1997–98 season.

The 1998–99 season saw the SuperSonics struggle. Westphal was dismissed after the team started the 2000–01 season 6–9, and replaced on an interim basis by assistant coach Nate McMillan, who was appointed permanent head coach in February 2001. In the 2002–03 season, All-Star Payton was traded to the Milwaukee Bucks; that season marked the end to the SuperSonics' 11-year run of seasons with a winning percentage of at least .500, then the second-longest current run in the NBA.

The 2004–05 team won the organization's sixth-division title under the leadership of Ray Allen and Rashard Lewis, winning 52 games and defeating the Sacramento Kings to advance to the 2005 Western Conference Semifinals. The SuperSonics lost in six games to the established trio of Tony Parker, Tim Duncan and Manu Ginóbili of the San Antonio Spurs, who subsequently defeated the Detroit Pistons in the 2005 NBA Finals. This was also the last time this SuperSonics team would make the playoffs. During the 2005 off-season, head coach McMillan left the SuperSonics to accept a high-paying position to coach the Portland Trail Blazers. The season after his departure, the team regressed with a 35–47 record.

On May 22, 2007, the SuperSonics were awarded the second pick in the 2007 NBA draft, equaling the highest draft position the team ever held, selecting Kevin Durant from the University of Texas. On June 28, the SuperSonics traded Ray Allen and the 35th pick of the second-round Glen Davis in the 2007 NBA draft to the Boston Celtics for rights to the fifth pick; Jeff Green, Wally Szczerbiak and Delonte West. On July 11, the SuperSonics and Orlando Magic agreed to a sign and trade for Rashard Lewis. The SuperSonics received a future second-round draft pick and a $9.5 million trade exception from the Magic. On July 20, the SuperSonics used the trade exception and a second-round draft pick to acquire Kurt Thomas and two first-round draft picks from the Phoenix Suns.

In 2007, morale was low at the beginning of the season as talks with the city of Seattle for a new arena had broken down. The SuperSonics had received a franchise player with the second-overall pick in the NBA draft with Durant. With the Ray Allen trade, however, the team had little talent with which to surround their rookie forward and lost their first eight games under coach P. J. Carlesimo to achieve a 3–14 record in the first month of the season. Durant led all rookies in scoring at 20.3 ppg and won the Rookie of the Year award. The SuperSonics, however, posted a franchise-worst record of 20–62. It was their final season in Seattle because Bennett got the right to move the team after settling all legal issues with the city. The Seattle SuperSonics played their last home game on April 13, 2008, winning 99–95 against the Dallas Mavericks. Throughout the game, the crowd chanted "Save our Sonics" and Durant waved his hands at the crowd. The last game they played was against Durant's future team, the Golden State Warriors at Oracle Arena three days later. Durant scored 42 points.

=== Move to Oklahoma City ===
From 2001 to 2006, Starbucks chairman emeritus, former president and CEO Howard Schultz was the majority owner of the team, along with 58 partners or minor owners as part of Basketball Club of Seattle LLP. On July 18, 2006, after unsuccessful efforts to persuade Washington state government officials to provide funding to update KeyArena, Schultz and Basketball Club of Seattle LLP sold the SuperSonics and their sister team, the Women's National Basketball Association's Seattle Storm, for $350 million to Professional Basketball Club LLC (PBC), an investment group that was headed by Oklahoma City businessman Clay Bennett. Schultz sold the franchise to Bennett's group because they thought Bennett would keep the franchise in Seattle rather than move it to Oklahoma City. Oklahoma City mayor Mick Cornett said:

I think it's presumptuous to assume that Clay Bennett and his ownership group won't own that Seattle team for a long, long time in Seattle or somewhere else. It's presumptuous to assume they're going to move that franchise to Oklahoma City. I understand that people are going to say that seems to be a likely scenario, but that's just speculation.

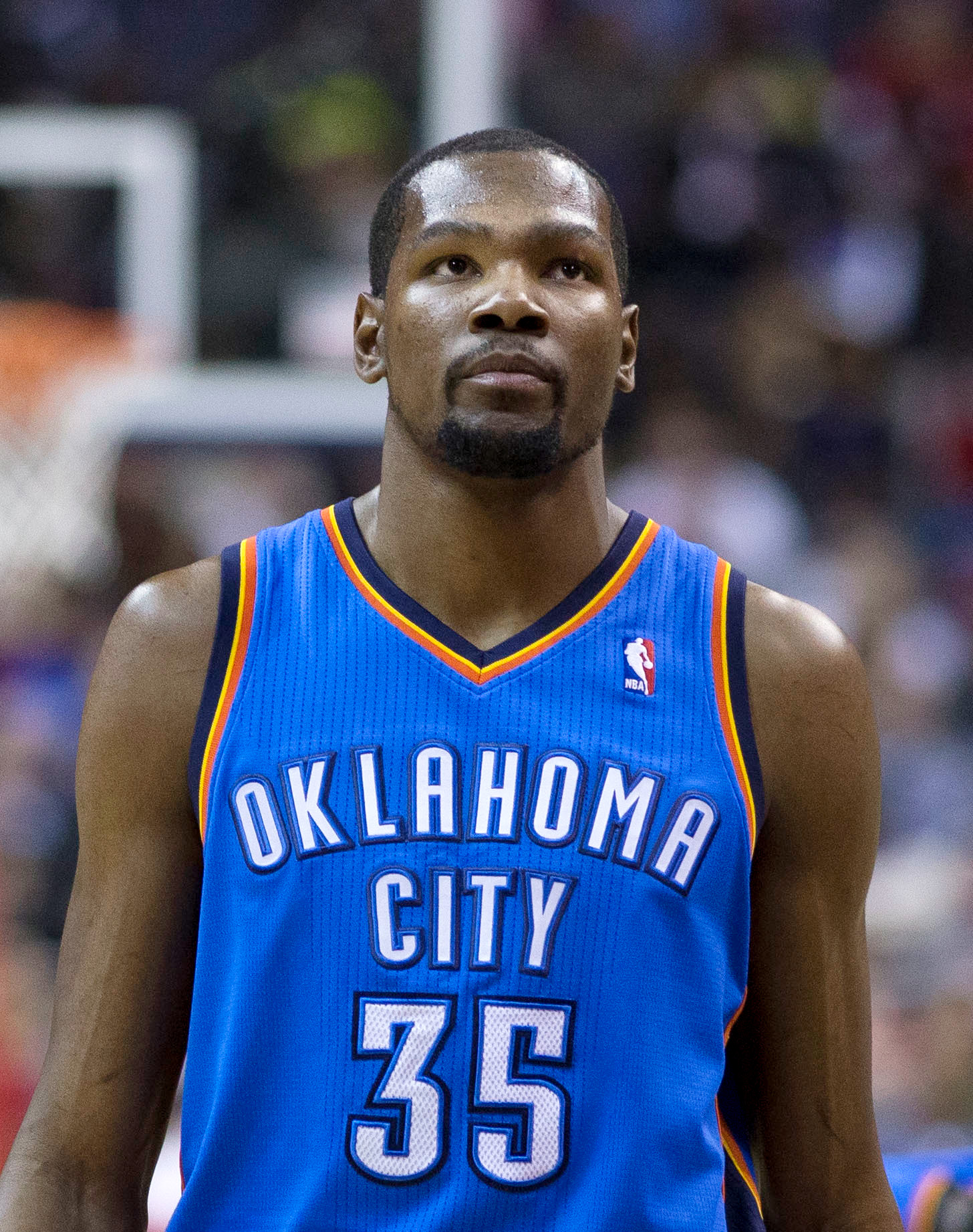
Kevin Durant (pictured in 2014), who was drafted by the SuperSonics in 2007

After failing to persuade local governments to fund a $500-million arena complex in the Seattle suburb of Renton, Bennett's group notified the NBA it intended to move the team to Oklahoma City and requested arbitration with the city of Seattle to be released from the SuperSonics' lease of KeyArena. The judge rejected the request and Seattle sued Bennett's group to enforce the lease that required the team to play at KeyArena until 2010.

On April 18, 2008, NBA owners approved a potential SuperSonics' move to Oklahoma City in a 28–2 vote by the league's Board of Governors; only Mark Cuban of the Dallas Mavericks and Paul Allen of the Portland Trail Blazers voted against the move. The approval meant the SuperSonics would be allowed to move to Oklahoma City's Ford Center for the 2008–09 season after reaching a settlement with the city of Seattle.

On July 2, 2008, a settlement that allowed the team to move under certain conditions, including the ownership group's payment of $45 million to Seattle and the possibility of an additional $30 million by 2013 if a new team had not been awarded to the city, was reached. It was agreed the Oklahoma City team would not use the name "SuperSonics", and that the team's history would be shared between Oklahoma City and any future NBA team in Seattle. The team began play as Oklahoma City Thunder for the 2008–09 season, becoming the third NBA franchise to move in the past decade, after the Vancouver Grizzlies, who moved to Memphis, Tennessee, and were renamed the Memphis Grizzlies for the 2001–02 season; and the Charlotte Hornets, who moved to New Orleans and began play as the New Orleans Hornets for the 2002–03 season.

In months before the settlement, the city government of Seattle released email conversations that took place within Bennett's ownership group and alleged they indicated at least some members of the group wanted to move the team to Oklahoma City before the 2006 purchase. Before that, SuperSonics co-owner Aubrey McClendon told The Journal Record; "we didn't buy the team to keep it in Seattle; we hoped to come here", although Bennett denied knowledge of this. Seattle used these incidents to argue that the owners failed to negotiate in good faith, prompting Schultz to file a lawsuit seeking to rescind the sale of the team and transfer the ownership to a court-appointed receiver. The NBA said Schultz's lawsuit was void because Schultz signed a release forbidding himself to sue Bennett's group but also said the proposal would have violated league ownership rules. Schultz dropped the case before the 2008–09 season.

In 2009, a group of Seattle filmmakers, the Seattle SuperSonics Historical Preservation Society, produced Sonicsgate – Requiem For A Team, a documentary that describes the rise of the Seattle SuperSonics franchise and its controversial departure from Seattle. It won critically acclaim and the 2010 Webby Award for Best Sports Film.

=== Failed new franchise ===
==== Sacramento Kings ====
In 2011, a group of investors led by hedge fund founder Chris Hansen spoke with Seattle mayor Mike McGinn about investing in an arena in hopes of securing an NBA franchise and reviving the Seattle SuperSonics. McGinn offered to Hansen to obtain ownership of KeyArena for little to no money.

Rumors Hansen would begin pursuing a vulnerable franchise to move to Seattle began circulating. Most of the discussion centered on the Sacramento Kings, a struggling franchise that had been unsuccessfully trying to replace the aging Power Balance Pavilion. The rumors were such that Think Big Sacramento, a community action group created by Sacramento mayor Kevin Johnson to develop solutions for the Kings, wrote to Hansen asking him not to pursue the city's team.

On May 16, 2012, after coming to agreement, McGinn, Constantine, and Hansen presented the proposed Memorandum of Understanding (MOU) to the public.

The King County Council voted to approve the MOU on July 30, 2012, adding amendments that provided for work with the Port of Seattle, securing the SuperSonics naming rights, offering reduced-price tickets, support for the Seattle Storm WNBA franchise, and requiring an economic analysis.

Hansen and Seattle City Council announced on September 11, 2012, a tentative agreement on a revised MOU that included the county council's amendments and new provisions; a personal guarantee from Hansen to cover cost overruns of construction of the new arena and make up any backfall for annual repayment of the city bonds issued. To address concerns of Port of Seattle, the Seattle Mariners, and local industry, a SoDo transportation improvement fund to be maintained at $40 million by tax revenue generated by the arena was also included. All parties agreed transaction documents would not be signed and construction would not begin before the state-required environmental impact analysis was completed. By a vote of 7–2, Seattle City Council approved the amended MOU on September 24, 2012. The King County Council reviewed the amended MOU and voted unanimously in favor of approval on October 15, 2012.

In June 2012, it was revealed Hansen's investment partners included Microsoft CEO Steve Ballmer, and brothers Erik and Peter Nordstrom of fashion retailer Nordstrom, Inc. Peter Nordstrom had been a minority owner of the SuperSonics under Howard Schultz's ownership. Wally Walker, a former SuperSonics executive, was also later revealed to be part of Hansen's group. On January 9, 2013, media reported the imminent sale of majority ownership of the Sacramento Kings to Hansen, Ballmer, the Nordstroms, and Walker for $500 million to move to Seattle as early as the 2013–14 NBA season.

On January 20, 2013, several sources reported the Maloof family had agreed to sell Hansen and Ballmer's ownership group their 53% stake in the Kings franchise, pending approval of the NBA's Board of Governors. The next day, the NBA, Hansen, and the Maloofs all released statements announcing the agreement, which also included the 12% minority stake of owner Robert Hernreich, and based the sale price on a team valuation of $525 million.

David Stern, then NBA Commissioner, confirmed on February 6, 2013, that the Maloofs, on behalf of the potential new ownership group, had formally requested permission to move the Kings from Sacramento to Seattle. Johnson, with guidance from Stern and the NBA league office, began to assemble an alternative ownership group that would keep the Kings in Sacramento and aid in getting a new arena constructed. On February 26, 2013, the Sacramento City Council voted to enter into negotiations with an unnamed group of investors revealed two days later to be headed by grocery magnate and developer Ron Burkle and Mark Mastrov, founder of 24 Hour Fitness. An initial counteroffer presented to the NBA by this new group was deemed "not comparable" as to merit consideration. Burkle eventually left the group because of a conflict with other business interests, but offered to be primary developer of lands around the planned downtown location of the new arena to aid in city council passage of public funding for the project. Mastrov took a backseat to Vivek Ranadivé, founder and CEO of TIBCO and a minority owner of the Golden State Warriors, brought in to assemble a stronger group of investors.

Ahead of the annual Board of Governors meeting where they were expected to vote on approval of the sale of the Kings to Hansen and Ballmer's group, as well as the request to move, members of the NBA owners' finance and relocation committees held a meeting in New York City on April 3, 2013, for the Seattle group and the Sacramento group to each present their proposals.

With the meeting of the Board of Governors to vote moved again to mid-May, the groups were asked to make another brief presentation to the full relocation committee on April 29, 2013. The committee voted to recommend rejection of the request to the full board. When the Board of Governors finally convened in Dallas on May 15, 2013, they heard final presentations from both the Seattle and Sacramento groups. The BOG voted 22–8 against moving the Kings from Sacramento to Seattle.

Though initially resistant to the idea, after negotiations, on May 17, 2013, the Maloof family and Hernreich formally agreed to sell their ownership stake in the Kings (65% of the team, valued at US$535 million) to Ranadivé's ownership group.

==== Milwaukee Bucks ====
In September 2013, then-Deputy Commissioner Adam Silver announced that the Milwaukee Bucks would need to replace the aging BMO Harris Bradley Center because of its small size and lack of amenities.

On April 16, 2014, it was announced owner Herb Kohl had agreed to sell the franchise to New York hedge-fund investors Marc Lasry and Wesley Edens for a record $550 million. The deal included provisions for contributions of $100 million each from Kohl and the new ownership group towards the construction of what would eventually be the new Fiserv Forum arena. During sale discussions, it was revealed Hansen and Ballmer had expressed interest in purchasing the team for more than $600 million but had not made a formal offer, as Kohl only entertained offers keeping the team in Milwaukee.

==== Atlanta Hawks ====
On January 2, 2015, Atlanta Journal-Constitution reported Atlanta Spirit, then-owners of the Atlanta Hawks, would sell the team. Initially, only majority owner Bruce Levenson would sell his stake but the remaining minority owners announced they would also sell their stakes, putting the entire franchise up for sale. On January 6, 2015, Seattle Post-Intelligencer reported Chris Hansen and film producer Thomas Tull—a minority owner of the NFL's Pittsburgh Steelers—would enter separate bids to acquire the Hawks and move them to Seattle. The NBA stated the Hawks were to remain in Atlanta as a condition of their sale; additionally, Atlanta Spirit were unlikely to sell the Hawks to a prospective owner that would seek to move the team, in contrast with the group's sale of the now-defunct Atlanta Thrashers of the NHL in 2011. Any attempt to move the Hawks out of Atlanta would have incurred a $75 million penalty from the city of Atlanta and Fulton County for breaking the Hawks' lease at Philips Arena before 2017. The Hawks were sold to a group led by Tony Ressler on June 24, 2015.

==== Future arena talks ====
On May 2, 2016, Seattle City Council voted 5–4 against vacating a section of Occidental Avenue South that connected property purchased by Hansen and was deemed critical to the siting of a future arena. The vote was seen as a significant delay to the MOU between Hansen, the city, and King County that expired in November 2017. On October 25, 2016, Chris Hansen announced he would fund the arena without public funding. On November 14, 2016, then-Seattle Seahawks quarterback Russell Wilson announced he would be investing in the NBA arena effort.

=== Potential revival ===
==== Arena renovations ====
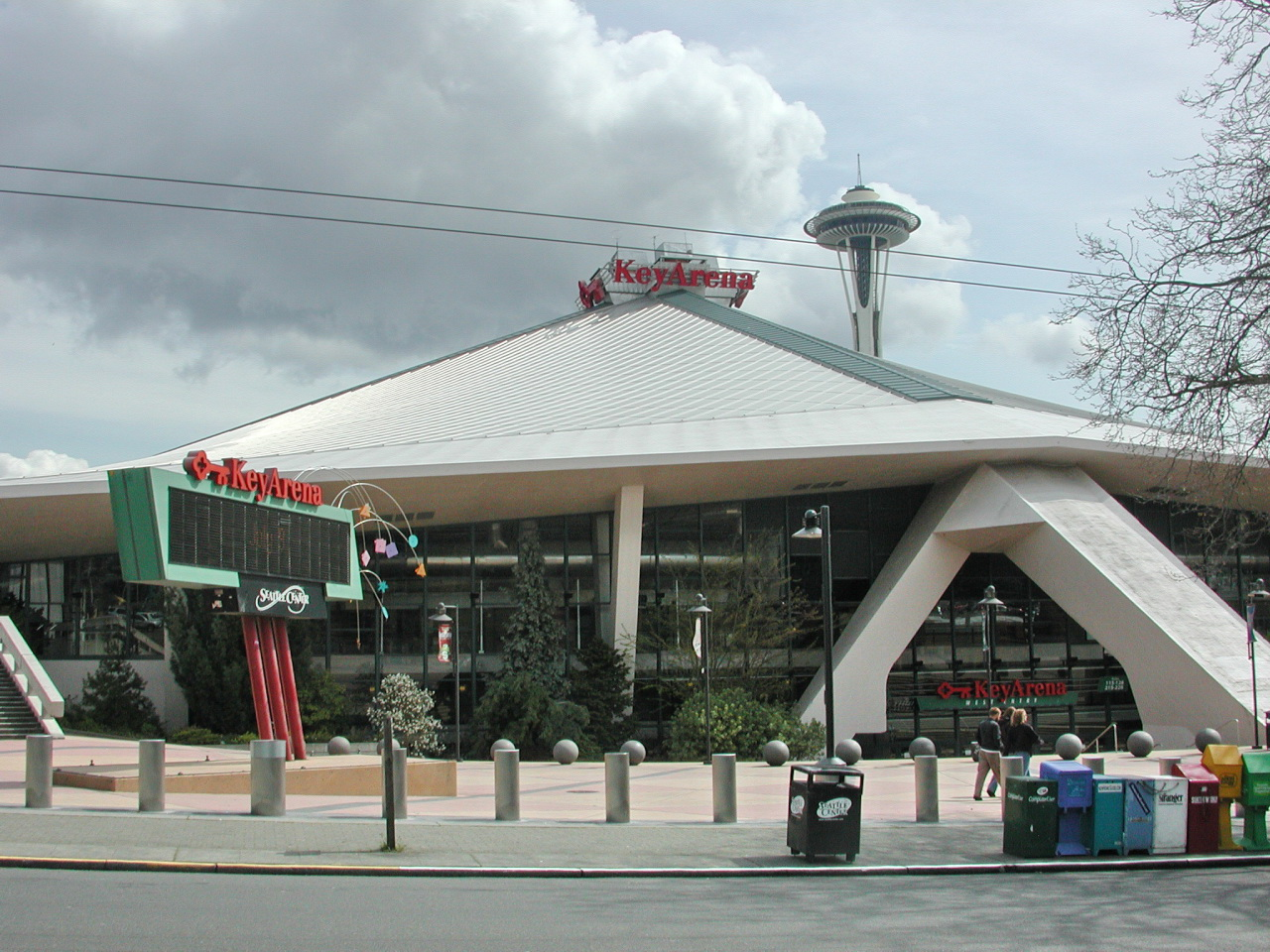
Over most of the franchise's history, Seattle played its home games at KeyArena.

While talks about building a new arena were underway, so were talks with another group of investors—including Tim Leiweke, co-founder of the Oak View Group—who wanted to renovate KeyArena, the SuperSonics' former home venue. On December 4, 2017, one day after the deal with Chris Hansen expired, Seattle City Council voted 7–1 to approve the renovation of KeyArena. The renovation was considered to mainly focus on fitting out the Seattle Kraken for the National Hockey League (NHL), although interest for the revival of the SuperSonics remained a possibility with the renovated arena. Hansen and his fellow investors felt having a future arena should be considered as a back-up plan for the future of the SuperSonics, they would support the renovation by Oak View Group if the plan to acquire an NBA team was successful. Renovations of KeyArena, which was renamed Climate Pledge Arena, began in 2018 and were completed by the beginning of the 2021–22 NBA and NHL seasons. Since the renovations, the NBA has hosted a preseason game known as the "Rain City Showcase" starting in 2022.

==== Future expansion ====
On September 17, 2024, in the midst of rumors of Seattle getting an NBA expansion team, ESPN reported that "if a team were to return to Seattle, the Thunder would cede the Seattle history back to the SuperSonics."

On December 18, 2025, NBA commissioner Adam Silver said that a decision would be made in 2026 on whether to proceed with expansion with Seattle being one of the markets to be considered.

During their meetings on March 24 and 25, 2026, the league's Board of Governors unanimously voted to explore adding an expansion team in Seattle and Las Vegas, which has paved the path for the possible revival of the SuperSonics.

== Home arenas ==
- KeyArena (formerly Seattle Center Coliseum, now Climate Pledge Arena): 1967–1978, 1985–1994, 1995–2008
- Kingdome: 1978–1985
- Tacoma Dome: 1994–1995

The SuperSonics played at the Seattle Center Coliseum, on the grounds of the Seattle Center, from 1967 to 1978. They left for the larger Kingdome and played there for seven years with crowds of over 30,000 at 20 games. The team returned to the Coliseum in 1985 and were its main tenant before and after its renovation into KeyArena, which opened in 1995. The SuperSonics played a season at the Tacoma Dome during the renovation and remained at KeyArena until 2008.

== Uniforms ==
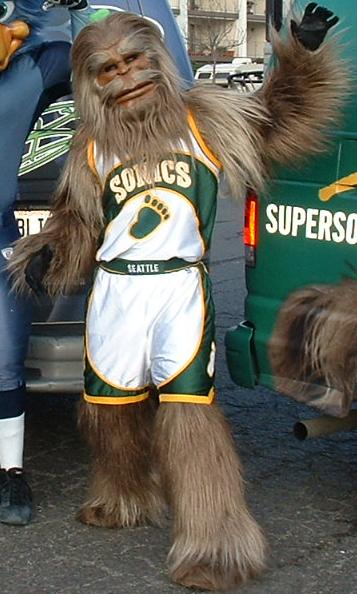
Squatch wearing the Sonics' home uniform in 2005

Seattle SuperSonics' first uniforms had "Sonics" displayed in a font that was also used by Cincinnati Royals (now the Sacramento Kings). The road jerseys were green and had yellow lettering; the home uniforms were white with green lettering. In 1995, SuperSonics changed their uniforms, adding red and orange, and removing yellow, to their new jerseys that would last six seasons. It displayed the team's new logo on the front and their alternative logo on the shorts. The home uniforms had green stripes on the right side of the jersey and shorts, and the green road jersey had red stripes.

The final SuperSonics uniforms were worn from the 2001–02 season through to the 2007–08 season. The team's owner Howard Schultz commissioned the design from Seattle design agency Hornall Anderson. The home jerseys were white with green-and-gold trim, displaying "SONICS" across the chest. Road uniforms were dark green with white-and-gold accents, with "SEATTLE" across the chest. The alternative uniform was gold with green-and-white trim with "SONICS" arched across the chest. These uniforms were an homage to a similar style worn from the 1975–76 season through to the 1994–95 season.

== Rivalries ==
The Seattle SuperSonics were traditional rivals of the Portland Trail Blazers because of the teams' proximity; the rivalry had been dubbed the I-5 Rivalry in reference to Interstate 5 that connects the two cities, which are 174 miles (280 km) apart. The rivalry was fairly equal in accomplishments; both teams won one championship. The all-time record of this rivalry is 98–94 in favor of the SuperSonics.

The SuperSonics were rivals of the Los Angeles Lakers due to the teams' longstanding pairing in the Pacific Division of the Western Conference. The Lakers' sustained success meant regular season games often affected NBA Playoffs seedings, with the teams matching head-to-head for numerous playoff battles.

== Achievements and honors ==
=== Retired numbers ===
Seattle SuperSonics retired numbers
| No. | Player | Position | Tenure | Date |
|---|---|---|---|---|
| 1 | Gus Williams | G | 1977–1984 | March 26, 2004 |
| 10 | Nate McMillan | G | 1986–1998 ^{1} | March 24, 1999 |
| 19 | Lenny Wilkens | G | 1968–1972 ^{2} | October 19, 1979 |
| 24 | Spencer Haywood | F | 1971–1975 | February 26, 2007 |
| 32 | Fred Brown | G | 1971–1984 | November 6, 1986 |
| 43 | Jack Sikma | C | 1977–1986 | November 21, 1992 |
| | Bob Blackburn | Broadcaster | 1967–1992 | April 17, 1993 |

Notes:

- ^{1} Also head coach from 2000 to 2005.
- ^{2} Head coach during 1969–1972 and 1977–1985.

=== Basketball Hall of Famers ===
Seattle SuperSonics Hall of Famers
Players
| No. | Name | Position | Tenure | Inducted |
|---|---|---|---|---|
| 19 | Lenny Wilkens ^{1} | G | 1968–1972 | 1989 |
| 44 | David Thompson | F/G | 1982–1984 | 1996 |
| 33 | Patrick Ewing ^{2} | C | 2000–2001 | 2008 |
| 24 | Dennis Johnson ^{3} | G | 1976–1980 | 2010 |
| 2; 20 | Gary Payton | G | 1990–2003 | 2013 |
| 30 | Šarūnas Marčiulionis | G | 1994–1995 | 2014 |
| 24 | Spencer Haywood | F/C | 1970–1975 | 2015 |
| 34 | Ray Allen | G | 2003–2007 | 2018 |
| 43 | Jack Sikma ^{4} | C | 1977–1986 | 2019 |
| 44 | Paul Westphal ^{5} | G | 1980–1981 | 2019 |
Coaches
| Name | | Position | Tenure | Inducted |
| Lenny Wilkens ^{1} | | Head coach | 1969–1972; 1977–1985 | 1998 |
| Bill Russell ^{6} | | Head coach | 1973–1977 | 2021 |
| George Karl | | Head coach | 1992–1998 | 2022 |
Contributors
| Name | | Position | Tenure | Inducted |
| 44 | Rod Thorn | G | 1967–1971 | 2018 |
| Rick Welts | | Executive | 1969–1979 | 2018 |

Notes:

- ^{1} In total, Wilkens was inducted into the Hall of Fame three times – as player, as coach and as a member of the 1992 Olympic team.
- ^{2} In total, Ewing was inducted into the Hall of Fame twice – as player and as a member of the 1992 Olympic team.
- ^{3} Inducted posthumously.
- ^{4} Also served as assistant coach (2003–2007).
- ^{5} Also served as head coach (1998–2000).
- ^{6} In total, Russell was inducted into the Hall of Fame twice – as a player and as coach.

=== FIBA Hall of Famers ===
Seattle SuperSonics Hall of Famers
Players
| No. | Name | Position | Tenure | Inducted |
|---|---|---|---|---|
| 30 | Šarūnas Marčiulionis | G | 1994–1995 | 2015 |
| 11 | Detlef Schrempf | F | 1993–1999 | 2021 |

=== Individual awards ===
NBA Defensive Player of the Year

- Gary Payton – 1996

NBA Rookie of the Year Award

- Kevin Durant – 2008

NBA Finals MVP

- Dennis Johnson – 1979

NBA Executive of the Year

- Zollie Volchok – 1983
- Bob Whitsitt – 1994

NBA Most Improved Player Award

- Dale Ellis – 1987

J. Walter Kennedy Citizenship Award

- Slick Watts – 1976

NBA Sportsmanship Award

- Hersey Hawkins – 1999
- Ray Allen – 2003

All-NBA First Team

- Spencer Haywood – 1972, 1973
- Gus Williams – 1982
- Gary Payton – 1998, 2000

All-NBA Second Team

- Spencer Haywood – 1974, 1975
- Dennis Johnson – 1980
- Gus Williams – 1980
- Shawn Kemp – 1994, 1995, 1996
- Gary Payton – 1995, 1996, 1997, 1999, 2002
- Vin Baker – 1998
- Ray Allen – 2005

All-NBA Third Team

- Dale Ellis – 1989
- Gary Payton – 1994, 2001
- Detlef Schrempf – 1995

NBA All-Defensive First Team

- Slick Watts – 1976
- Dennis Johnson – 1979, 1980
- Gary Payton – 1994–2002

NBA All-Defensive Second Team

- Lonnie Shelton – 1982
- Jack Sikma – 1982
- Danny Vranes – 1985
- Nate McMillan – 1994, 1995

NBA All-Rookie First Team

- Bob Rule – 1968
- Al Tucker – 1968
- Art Harris – 1969
- Tom Burleson – 1975
- Jack Sikma – 1978
- Xavier McDaniel – 1986
- Derrick McKey – 1988
- Jeff Green – 2008
- Kevin Durant – 2008

NBA All-Rookie Second Team

- Gary Payton – 1991
- Desmond Mason – 2001
- Vladimir Radmanović – 2002

All-Star Game

NBA All-Star Game

- Walt Hazzard – 1968
- Lenny Wilkens – 1969, 1970, 1971
- Bob Rule – 1969
- Spencer Haywood – 1972–1975
- Fred Brown – 1976
- Dennis Johnson – 1979, 1980
- Jack Sikma – 1979–1985
- Paul Westphal – 1981
- Lonnie Shelton – 1982
- Gus Williams – 1982, 1983
- David Thompson – 1983
- Tom Chambers – 1987
- Xavier McDaniel – 1988
- Dale Ellis – 1989
- Shawn Kemp – 1993–1997
- Gary Payton – 1994–1998, 2000–2003
- Detlef Schrempf – 1995, 1997
- Vin Baker – 1998
- Ray Allen – 2004–2007
- Rashard Lewis – 2005

NBA All-Star Game MVPs

- Lenny Wilkens – 1971
- Tom Chambers – 1987

NBA All-Star Game head coaches

- Lenny Wilkens – 1979, 1980
- George Karl – 1994, 1996, 1998

== Staff ==
=== Head coaches ===
- Al Bianchi, 1967–1969
- Lenny Wilkens, 1969–1972
- Tom Nissalke, 1972–1973
- Bucky Buckwalter, 1973
- Bill Russell. 1973–1977
- Bob Hopkins, 1977
- Lenny Wilkens, 1977–1985
- Bernie Bickerstaff, 1985–1990
- K. C. Jones, 1990–1992
- Bob Kloppenburg, 1992
- George Karl, 1992–1998
- Paul Westphal, 1998–2000
- Nate McMillan, 2000–2005
- Bob Weiss, 2005–2006
- Bob Hill, 2006–2007
- P. J. Carlesimo, 2007–2008

=== General managers ===
- Don Richman, 1967–1968
- Dick Vertlieb, 1968–1969
- Zollie Volchok, 1969
- Bob Houbregs, 1969–1973
- Bucky Buckwalter, 1973
- Bill Russell, 1973–1977
- Zollie Volchok, 1977–1983
- Les Habegger, 1983–1985
- Lenny Wilkens, 1985–1986
- Bob Whitsitt, 1986–1994
- Wally Walker, 1994–2001
- Rick Sund, 2001–2007
- Sam Presti, 2007–2008

== Records and leaders ==
=== Franchise leaders ===
Points scored (regular season) (as of the end of the 2007–08 season)

1. Gary Payton (18,207)
2. Fred Brown (14,018)
3. Jack Sikma (12,258)
4. Rashard Lewis (12,034)
5. Shawn Kemp (10,148)
6. Gus Williams (9,676)
7. Dale Ellis (9,405)
8. Xavier McDaniel (8,438)
9. Spencer Haywood (8,131)
10. Tom Chambers (8,028)
11. Ray Allen (7,237)
12. Detlef Schrempf (6,870)
13. Dick Snyder (6,507)
14. Derrick McKey (6,159)
15. Lenny Wilkens (6,010)
16. Bob Rule (5,646)
17. Vin Baker (5,054)
18. Sam Perkins (4,844)
19. Nate McMillan (4,733)
20. Dennis Johnson (4,590)
21. Lonnie Shelton (4,460)
22. Ricky Pierce (4,393)
23. Brent Barry (4,107)
24. Tom Meschery (4,050)
25. Hersey Hawkins (3,798)
26. Michael Cage (3,742)
27. Eddie Johnson (3,714)
28. John Johnson (3,608)
29. Slick Watts (3,396)
30. Al Wood (3,265)

Other Statistics (regular season) (as of the end of the 2007–08 season)

Most minutes played
| Player | Minutes |
|---|---|
| Gary Payton | 36,858 |
| Jack Sikma | 24,707 |
| Fred Brown | 24,422 |
| Rashard Lewis | 20,921 |
| Nate McMillan | 20,462 |

Most rebounds
| Player | Rebounds |
|---|---|
| Jack Sikma | 7,729 |
| Shawn Kemp | 5,978 |
| Gary Payton | 4,240 |
| Michael Cage | 3,975 |
| Spencer Haywood | 3,954 |

Most assists
| Player | Assists |
|---|---|
| Gary Payton | 7,384 |
| Nate McMillan | 4,893 |
| Fred Brown | 3,160 |
| Gus Williams | 2,865 |
| Lenny Wilkens | 2,777 |

Most steals
| Player | Steals |
|---|---|
| Gary Payton | 2,107 |
| Nate McMillan | 1,544 |
| Fred Brown | 1,149 |
| Gus Williams | 1,086 |
| Slick Watts | 833 |

Most blocks
| Player | Blocks |
|---|---|
| Shawn Kemp | 959 |
| Jack Sikma | 705 |
| Alton Lister | 500 |
| Tom Burleson | 420 |
| Derrick McKey | 375 |

=== Individual leaders ===
Single-game records
| Statistic | Player | Value | Date |
|---|---|---|---|
| Points | Fred Brown | 58 | March 23, 1974 |
| Rebounds | Jim Fox | 30 | December 26, 1973 |
| Assists | Nate McMillan | 25 | February 23, 1987 |
| Steals | Fred Brown; Gus Williams | 10 | December 3, 1976; February 22, 1978 |

Single-season leaders
| Statistic | Player | Value | Season |
|---|---|---|---|
| Points | Dale Ellis | 2,253 | 1988–89 |
| Points per game | Spencer Haywood | 29.2 | 1972–73 (Note: Bob Rule averaged 29.8 points per game for the SuperSonics in the 1970–71 season, but only played in four games, thereby missing the standard qualification minimums.) |
| Rebounds | Jack Sikma | 1,038 | 1981–82 |
| Rebounds per game | Spencer Haywood | 13.4 | 1973–74 |
| Assists | Lenny Wilkens | 766 | 1971–72 |
| Assists per game | Lenny Wilkens | 9.6 | 1971–72 |
| Steals | Slick Watts | 261 | 1975–76 |
| Steals per game | Slick Watts | 3.18 | 1975–76 |

Career leaders
| Statistic | Player | Value |
|---|---|---|
| Games | Gary Payton | 999 |
| Minutes played | Gary Payton | 36,858 |
| Points | Gary Payton | 18,207 |
| Field goals made | Gary Payton | 7,292 |
| Field goal attempts | Gary Payton | 15,562 |
| 3-point field goals made | Rashard Lewis | 918 |
| 3-point field goal attempts | Gary Payton | 2,855 |
| Free throws made | Jack Sikma | 3,044 |
| Free throw attempts | Shawn Kemp | 3,808 |
| Offensive rebounds | Shawn Kemp | 2,145 |
| Defensive rebounds | Jack Sikma | 5,948 |
| Total rebounds | Jack Sikma | 7,729 |
| Assists | Gary Payton | 7,384 |
| Steals | Gary Payton | 2,107 |
| Blocked shots | Shawn Kemp | 959 |
| Turnovers | Gary Payton | 2,507 |
| Personal fouls | Gary Payton | 2,577 |

== See also ==
- Bob Blackburn (announcer)
- Kevin Calabro
- List of relocated NBA teams
- List of Seattle SuperSonics seasons
- Sonicsgate
- Seattle SuperSonics relocation to Oklahoma City
- Sonics Arena
- Wheedle

== Notes ==
| Preceded by Washington Bullets | NBA champions 1978–79 | Succeeded by Los Angeles Lakers |
