= List of Seattle Mariners first-round draft picks =

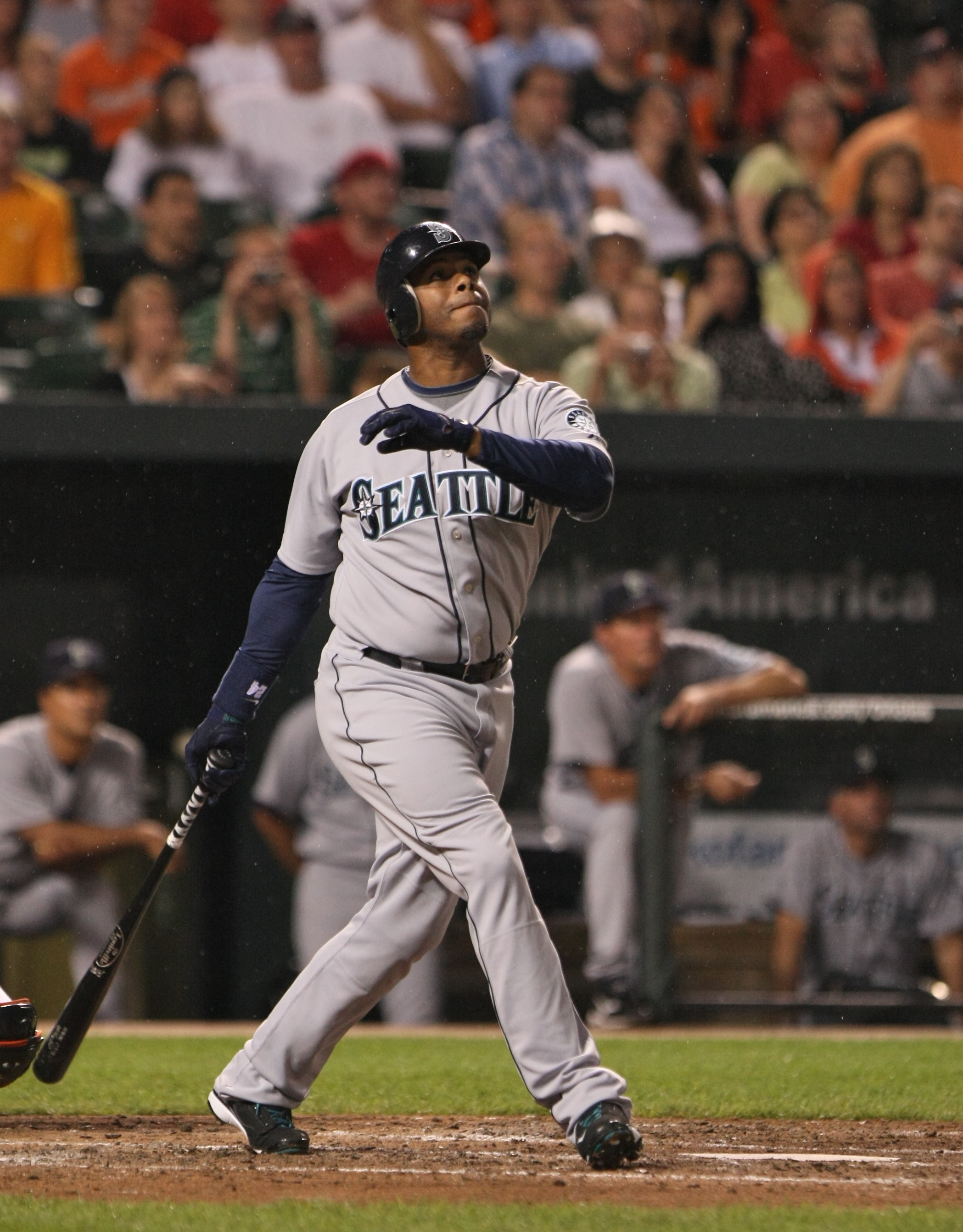
Ken Griffey Jr. was the first pick overall in the 1987 draft, a 13-time All-Star selection during his career, and a first-ballot Hall of Fame inductee in 2016.

The Seattle Mariners are a Major League Baseball (MLB) franchise based in Seattle, Washington. They play in the American League West division. Since the franchise entered the league as an expansion team in 1977, they have selected 47 players in the first round. Officially known as the "First-Year Player Draft", the Rule 4 Draft is Major League Baseball's primary mechanism for assigning amateur baseball players from high schools, colleges, and other amateur baseball clubs to its teams. The draft order is determined based on the previous season's standings, with the team possessing the worst record receiving the first pick. In addition, teams that lost free agents in the previous off-season may be awarded compensatory or supplementary picks. The First-Year Player Draft is unrelated to the 1976 expansion draft through which the Mariners filled their roster.

Of the 47 players selected in the first round by the Mariners, 18 have been pitchers, the most of any position; of whom 13 were right-handed and five left-handed. They have also drafted nine outfielders, eight shortstops, seven catchers, three first basemen and two third baseman. Seattle has never drafted a second baseman in the first round. The Mariners have drafted 22 players out of high school, and 24 out of college. All of the college selections came from four-year institutions; the team has never selected a junior college player in the first round. The Mariners have drafted 11 players from high schools or colleges in California, four players from Florida, and a single player from their home state of Washington. One of the Mariners' 2007 picks—Canadian Phillippe Aumont—is the only selection from outside the United States.

One Mariners first-round selection is a member of the Baseball Hall of Fame. Ken Griffey Jr. was inducted in 2016, having received an all-time record of 99.3% of the possible votes from the Baseball Writers' Association of America. Two of the Mariners' first-round selections, Alex Rodriguez and Griffey, are members of the 500 home run club. Rodriguez won a World Series title with the New York Yankees, four Hank Aaron Awards, three American League MVP awards, and was named to 13 All-Star teams. The Mariners have held the first overall pick four times, most recently in 1993. The Mariners have made eight selections in the supplemental round of the draft and 11 compensatory picks over their history. These additional picks are provided when a team loses a particularly valuable free agent in the previous off-season,^{[V]} or, more recently, if a team fails to sign a draft pick from the previous year. The Mariners have failed to sign two of their picks, Scott Burrell in 1989 and John Mayberry, Jr. in 2002. For failing to sign these picks, the team received the 38th pick in the 1990 draft and the 37th pick in the 2003 draft, respectively.

== Key ==
Year	Each year links to an article about that year's Major League Baseball draft.
Position	Indicates the secondary/collegiate position at which the player was drafted, rather than the professional position the player may have gone on to play
Pick	Indicates the number of the pick within the first round
*	Player did not sign with the Mariners
§	Indicates a supplemental pick
†	Member of the National Baseball Hall of Fame
500	Indicates a member of the 500 home run club

== Picks ==
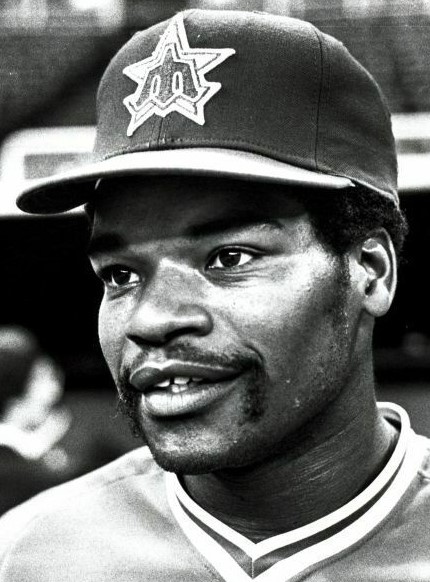
Dave Henderson (1977) was the first draft pick in franchise history.

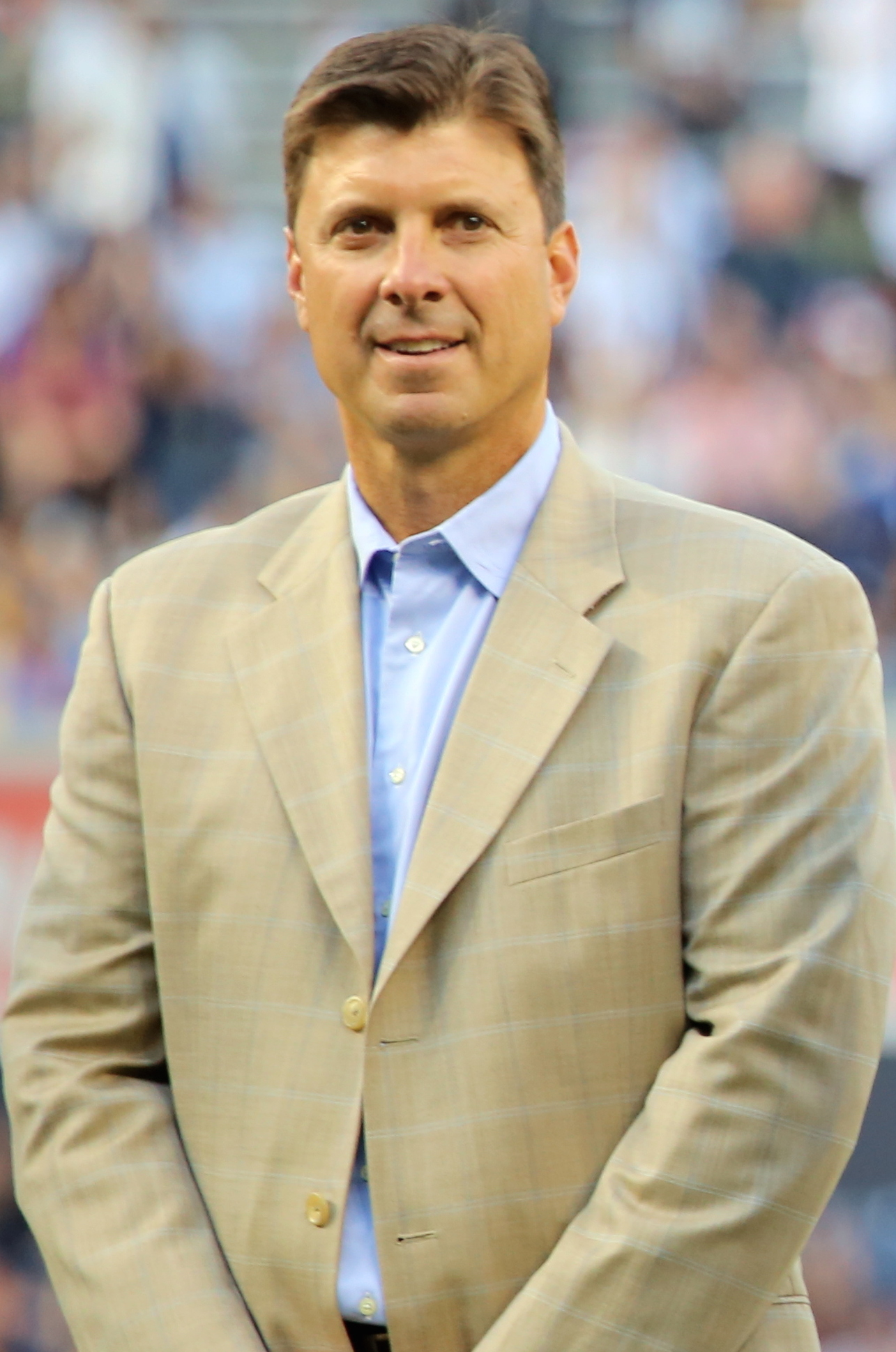
Tino Martinez (1988) won four World Series rings during his career.

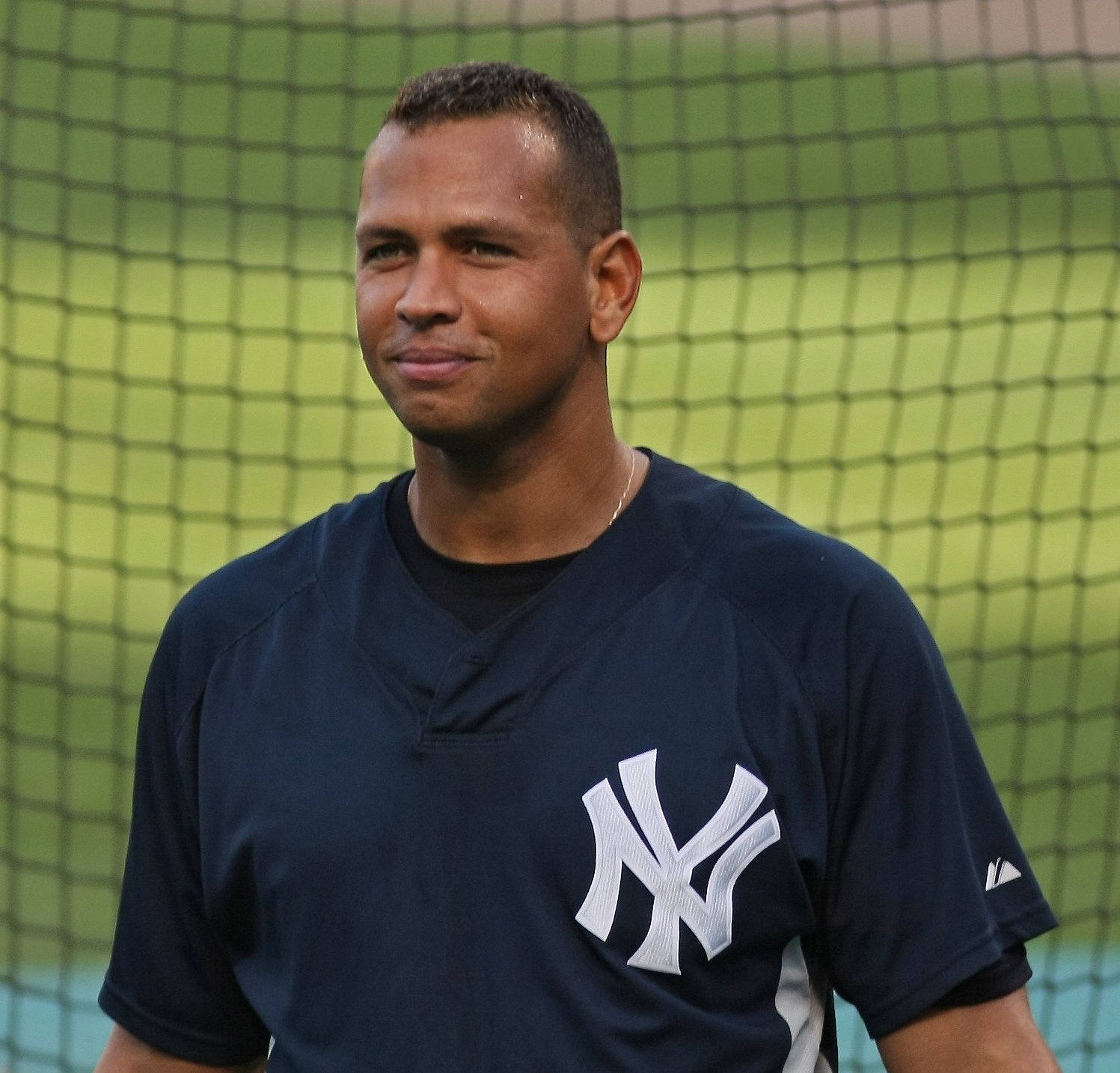
Alex Rodriguez (1993) is a three-time American League Most Valuable Player.

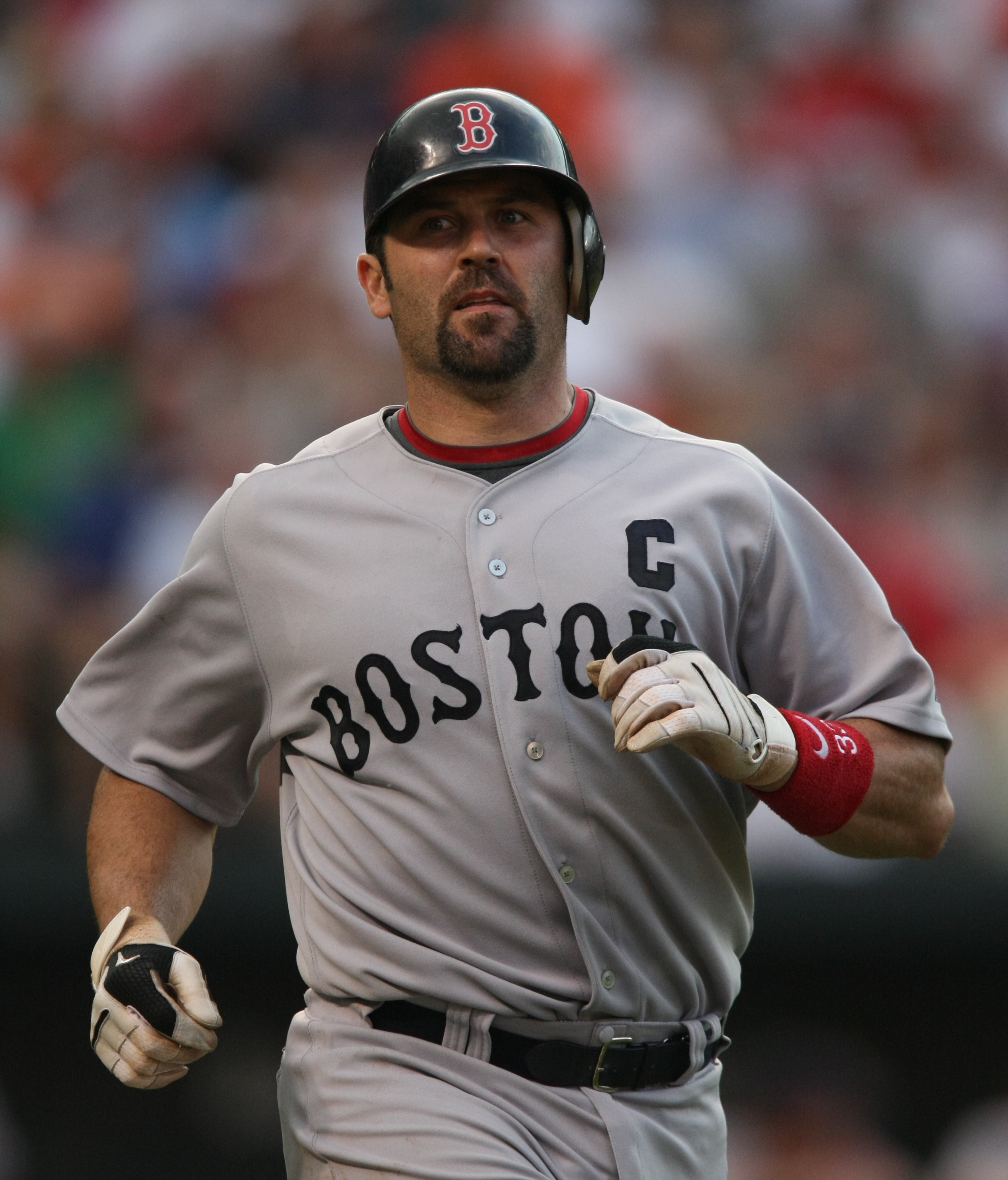
Jason Varitek (1994) played his entire MLB career with the Boston Red Sox.

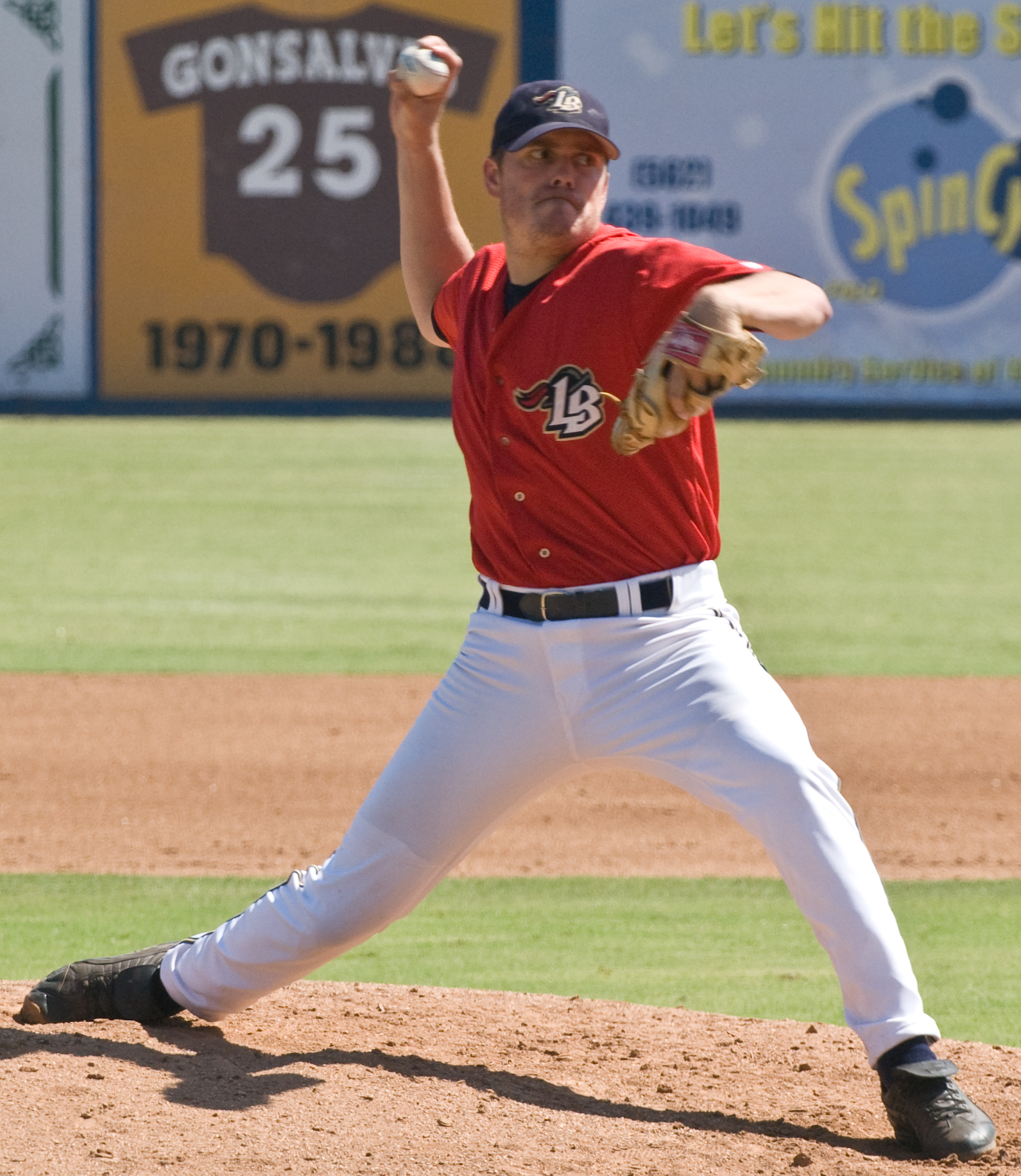
Jeff Heaverlo (1999) is the only player the Mariners have drafted out of Washington in the first round, as of 2026.

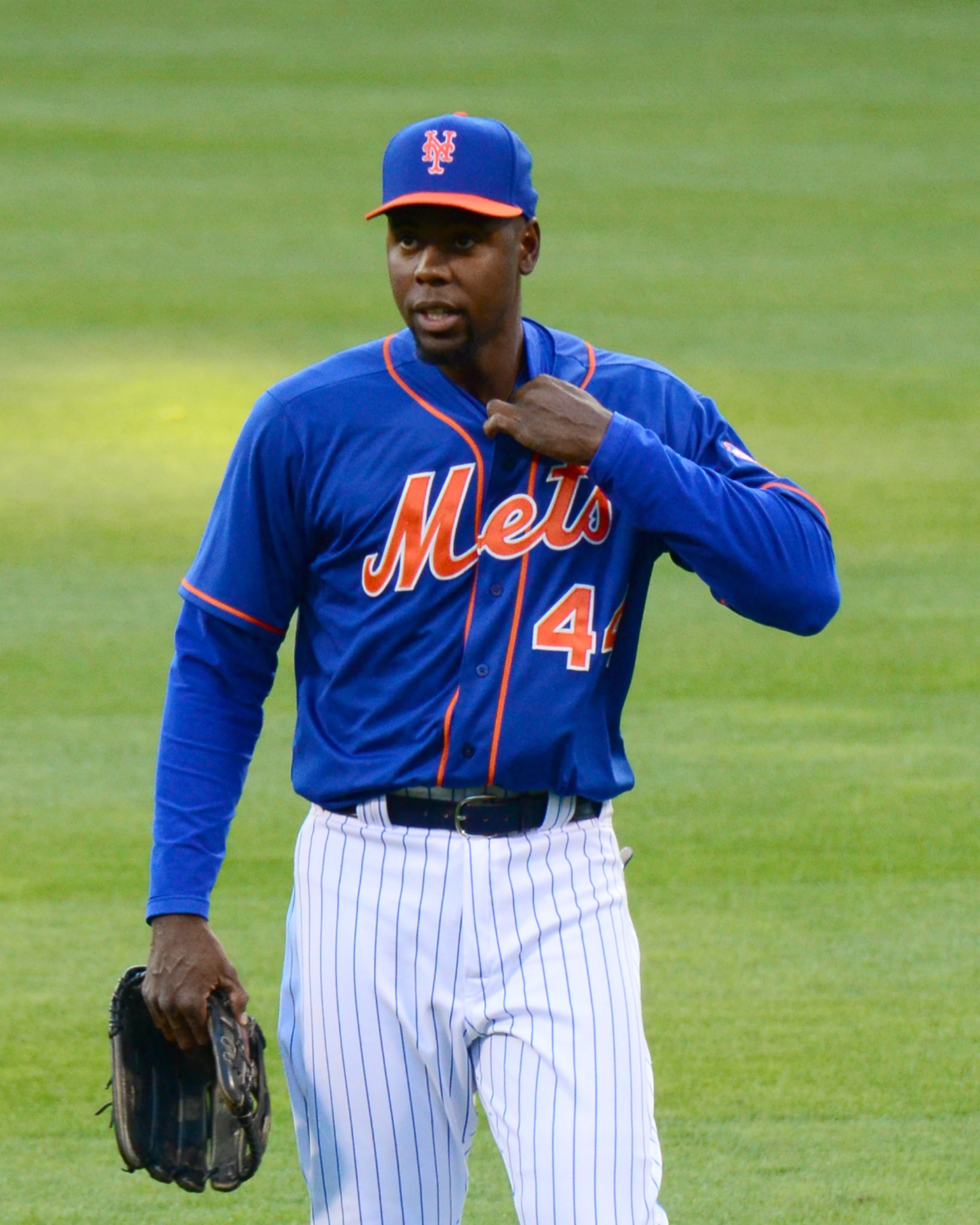
John Mayberry Jr. (2002) is one of Seattle's only two first-round draft picks not to sign with the Mariners.

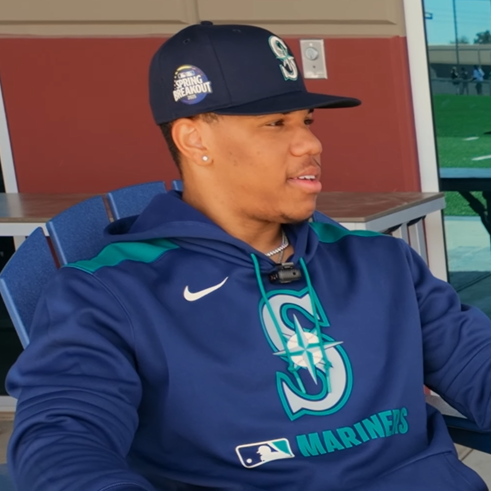
Jurrangelo Cijntje (2024) was the first college baseball player selected by Seattle in the first round since 2020.

Year	Name	Position	School (location)	Pick	Ref
1977	Dave Henderson	Outfielder	Dos Palos High School (Dos Palos, California)	26	
1978	Tito Nanni	Outfielder	Chestnut Hill Academy (Philadelphia, Pennsylvania)	6	
1979	Al Chambers	Outfielder	John Harris High School (Harrisburg, Pennsylvania)	1	
1980	Darnell Coles	Shortstop	Eisenhower High School (Rialto, California)	6	
1981	Mike Moore	Right-handed pitcher	Oral Roberts University (Tulsa, Oklahoma)	1	
1982	Spike Owen	Shortstop	University of Texas at Austin (Austin, Texas)	6	
1983	Darrel Akerfelds	Right-handed pitcher	Mesa State College (Grand Junction, Colorado)	7	
1983	Terry Bell	Catcher	Old Dominion University (Norfolk, Virginia)	17§^{[a]}	
1984	Bill Swift	Right-handed pitcher	University of Maine (Orono, Maine)	2	
1985	Mike Campbell	Right-handed pitcher	University of Hawaiʻi at Mānoa (Honolulu, Hawaii)	7	
1985	Bill McGuire	Catcher	University of Nebraska–Lincoln (Lincoln, Nebraska)	27§^{[b]}	
1986	Patrick Lennon	Shortstop	Whiteville High School (Whiteville, North Carolina)	8	
1987	Ken Griffey Jr.^{†}500	Outfielder	Moeller High School (Cincinnati, Ohio)	1	
1988	Tino Martinez	First baseman	University of Tampa (Tampa, Florida)	14	
1989	Roger Salkeld	Right-handed pitcher	Saugus High School (Santa Clarita, California)	3	
1989	Scott Burrell*	Right-handed pitcher	Hamden High School (Hamden, Connecticut)	26§^{[c]}	
1990	Marc Newfield	First baseman	Marina High School (Huntington Beach, California)	6	
1990	Anthony Manahan	Shortstop	Arizona State University (Tempe, Arizona)	38§^{[d]}	
1991	Shawn Estes	Left-handed pitcher	Douglas High School (Gardnerville, Nevada)	11	
1992	Ron Villone	Left-handed pitcher	University of Massachusetts Amherst (Amherst, Massachusetts)	14	
1993	Alex Rodriguez 500	Shortstop	Westminster Christian High School (Miami, Florida)	1	
1994	Jason Varitek	Catcher	Georgia Tech (Atlanta, Georgia)	14	
1995	José Cruz Jr.	Outfielder	Rice University (Houston, Texas)	3	
1996	Gil Meche	Right-handed pitcher	Acadiana High School (Lafayette, Louisiana)	22	
1997	Ryan Anderson	Left-handed pitcher	Divine Child High School (Dearborn, Michigan)	19	
1998	Matt Thornton	Left-handed pitcher	Grand Valley State University (Allendale, Michigan)	22	
1999	Ryan Christianson	Catcher	Arlington High School (Riverside, California)	11	
1999	Jeff Heaverlo	Right-handed pitcher	University of Washington (Seattle, Washington)	33§^{[e]}	
2000	no first-round pick^{[f]}				
2001	Michael Garciaparra	Shortstop	Don Bosco High School (La Habra Heights, California)	36§^{[g]}	
2002	John Mayberry Jr.*	Outfielder	Rockhurst High School (Kansas City, Missouri)	28	
2003	Adam Jones	Shortstop	Samuel F. B. Morse High School (San Diego, California)	37§^{[h]}	
2004	no first-round pick^{[i]}				
2005	Jeff Clement	Catcher	University of Southern California (Los Angeles, California)	3	
2006	Brandon Morrow	Right-handed pitcher	University of California, Berkeley (Berkeley, California)	5	
2007	Phillippe Aumont	Right-handed pitcher	École secondaire du Versant (Gatineau, Quebec)	11	
2007	Matt Mangini	Third baseman	Oklahoma State University–Stillwater (Stillwater, Oklahoma)	52§^{[j]}	
2008	Josh Fields	Right-handed pitcher	University of Georgia (Athens, Georgia)	20	
2009	Dustin Ackley	Outfielder	University of North Carolina at Chapel Hill (Chapel Hill, North Carolina)	2	
2009	Nick Franklin	Shortstop	Lake Brantley High School (Altamonte Springs, Florida)	27^{[k]}	
2009	Steven Baron	Catcher	John A. Ferguson High School (Miami, Florida)	33§^{[l]}	
2010	Taijuan Walker	Right-handed pitcher	Yucaipa High School (Yucaipa, California)	43§^{[m]}	
2011	Danny Hultzen	Left-handed pitcher	University of Virginia (Charlottesville, Virginia)	2	
2012	Mike Zunino	Catcher	University of Florida (Gainesville, Florida)	3	
2013	D. J. Peterson	Third baseman	University of New Mexico (Albuquerque, New Mexico)	12	
2014	Alex Jackson	Outfielder	Rancho Bernardo High School (San Diego County, California)	6	
2015	no first-round pick^{[n]}				
2016	Kyle Lewis	Outfielder	Mercer University (Macon, Georgia)	11	
2017	Evan White	First baseman	University of Kentucky (Lexington, Kentucky)	17	
2018	Logan Gilbert	Right-handed pitcher	Stetson University (DeLand, Florida)	14	
2019	George Kirby	Right-handed pitcher	Elon University (Elon, North Carolina)	20	
2020	Emerson Hancock	Right-handed pitcher	University of Georgia (Athens, Georgia)	6	
2021	Harry Ford	Catcher	North Cobb High School (Kennesaw, Georgia)	12	
2022	Cole Young	Shortstop	North Allegheny High School (Wexford, Pennsylvania)	21	
2023	Colt Emerson	Shortstop	John Glenn High School (New Concord, Ohio)	22	
2023	Jonny Farmelo	Outfielder	Westfield High School (Chantilly, Virginia)	29§^{[o]}	
2023	Tai Peete	Shortstop	Trinity Christian School (Sharpsburg, Georgia)	30§	
2024	Jurrangelo Cijntje	Switch-handed pitcher	Mississippi State University (Starkville, Mississippi)	15	
2025	Kade Anderson	Left-handed pitcher	Louisiana State University (Baton Rouge, Louisiana)	3	
2025	Luke Stevenson	Catcher	University of North Carolina (Chapel Hill, North Carolina)	35§	
2026	Ace Reese	Third baseman	Mississippi State University (Starkville, Mississippi)	24	

== See also ==
- Seattle Mariners minor league players

== Footnotes ==
- ^{V} Through the 2012 draft, free agents were evaluated by the Elias Sports Bureau and rated "Type A", "Type B", or not compensation-eligible. If a team offered arbitration to a player but that player refused and subsequently signed with another team, the original team was able to receive additional draft picks. If a "Type A" free agent left in this way, his previous team received a supplemental pick and a compensatory pick from the team with which he signed. If a "Type B" free agent left in this way, his previous team received only a supplemental pick. Since the 2013 draft, free agents are no longer classified by type; instead, compensatory picks are only awarded if the team offered its free agent a contract worth at least the average of the 125 current richest MLB contracts. However, if the free agent's last team acquired the player in a trade during the last year of his contract, it is ineligible to receive compensatory picks for that player.
- ^{a} The Mariners gained a supplemental first-round pick in 1983 as compensation for losing free agent Floyd Bannister.
- ^{b} The Mariners gained a supplemental first-round pick in 1985 as compensation for losing free agent Steve Henderson.
- ^{c} The Mariners gained a supplemental first-round pick in 1989 as compensation for losing free agent Mike Moore.
- ^{d} The Mariners gained a supplemental first-round pick in 1990 as compensation for not signing first-round draft pick Scott Burrell.
- ^{e} The Mariners gained a supplemental first-round pick in 1999 as compensation for losing free agent Mike Timlin.
- ^{f} The Mariners lost their first-round pick in 2000 to the New York Mets as compensation for signing free agent John Olerud.
- ^{g} The Mariners gained a supplemental first-round pick in 2001 as compensation for losing free agent Alex Rodriguez.
- ^{h} The Mariners gained a supplemental first-round pick in 2003 as compensation for not signing first-round draft pick John Mayberry, Jr.
- ^{i} The Mariners lost their first-round pick in 2004 to the Minnesota Twins as compensation for signing free agent Eddie Guardado.
- ^{j} The Mariners gained a supplemental first-round pick in 2007 as compensation for losing free agent Gil Meche.
- ^{k} The Mariners received a compensatory first-round pick in 2009 from the Philadelphia Phillies as compensation for free agent Raúl Ibañez.
- ^{l} The Mariners gained a supplemental first-round pick in 2009 as compensation for losing free agent Raúl Ibañez.
- ^{m} The Mariners gained a supplemental first-round pick in 2010 as compensation for losing free agent Adrián Beltré.
- ^{n} The Mariners lost their first-round pick in 2015 for signing free agent Nelson Cruz.
- ^{o} The Mariners gained a supplemental first-round pick in 2023 for Julio Rodriguez winning Rookie of the Year.
