= Tito Nanni =

American baseball player (born 1959)

- First baseman / Outfielder
- Born: December 3, 1959 (age 66); Philadelphia, Pennsylvania, U.S.
- Bats: Left Throws: Left
- Stats at Baseball Reference

Tito Angelo Nanni Jr. (born December 3, 1959 in Philadelphia, Pennsylvania) is an American former professional baseball player. Over his career Nanni primarily played first base and outfield. Nanni played in the Seattle Mariners organization for the majority of his career. He also spent part of a season playing for the California Angels organization and for the Toronto Blue Jays organization. Nanni played seven seasons in minor league baseball, with a career batting average of .253 with a .384 slugging percentage, 21 hits, 122 doubles, 22 triples, and 66 home runs in 2,775 at-bats.

== Amateur career ==
Nanni attended Chestnut Hill Academy high school in Philadelphia, Pennsylvania. Nanni is a hall of fame member at his school. During his athletics career at Chestnut Hill, Nanni played baseball, basketball, and football. He was captain and the most valuable player for each sport he played. He was an All-City selection in football, an All-Inter-Ac in basketball, and All-City, All-American and the Philadelphia Daily News Player of the Year in baseball. During his senior baseball season, Nanni batted .450 with 10 double, four triples, 4 home runs and 20 RBIs. He was recruited by Wake Forest University and Boston College to play football, but Nanni opted to pursue a career in baseball.

== Professional career ==
=== Seattle Mariners ===
==== 1978–1980 ====
Nanni was drafted by the Seattle Mariners in the first round (sixth pick overall) of the 1978 Major League Baseball draft. Nanni committed to play baseball and football for the University of North Carolina at Chapel Hill, but chose to enter professional baseball instead. When asked about being drafted sixth overall Nanni stated, "It was an honor [...] two days before the draft, I was talking to my coach and it was the first time I had heard anything about how high I was going to go. [...] So for two days all of a sudden I had to start thinking. What am I going to do? Here I'm thinking I'm going to go low and it wouldn't be a problem, because the money's not that good, and you're better off going to college. So I did a lot of thinking. Accounts by then-Mariners general manager, Dick Viertleib, later indicated that Kirk Gibson was supposed to be their first round draft choice, but the team's financiers did not want to pay the higher salary that Gibson was likely to ask for.

Nanni was signed on August 22, and was assigned to the Arizona League Mariners. The chief scout for the Seattle Mariners who signed Nanni, Mel Didier, was later fired because the Mariners claimed Nanni's $100,000 contract violated Major League Baseball regulations. Nanni began his professional career as a non-roster invitee to the Mariners spring training camp in 1979. On March 6, Nanni drove in the winning run for his team during an intra-squad scrimmage. Following spring training, he was assigned to the Class-A Alexandria Mariners of the Carolina League. He was sidelined for a month after jamming his finger on a bunt attempt. He batted .226 with 111 hits, 22 doubles, 1 triple, and 6 home runs. He led the league in strikeouts, with 123. Nanni was assigned to the Mariners Winter Instructional League team following the 1978 regular season. He hit .258 with 62 RBIs.

The next season, 1980, Nanni split time between the Class-A Wausau Timbers and the Class-A San Jose Missions. With the Missions, Nanni batted .299 with 113 hits, 22 doubles, 1 triple, and 13 home runs. Following his struggles with San Jose, the Mariners assigned Nanni to the Timbers, where he batted .310 with 106 hits, 24 doubles, and 22 home runs. His 22 home runs that year were tied for third on the Wausau club with Jim Presley. Nanni credited shortening his swing as the reason for his success in Wausau. Following the season, Nanni played for the Mariners winter league squad.

==== 1981–1984 ====
On March 27, 1981, after spring training, Nanni was assigned to the Triple-A Spokane Indians, however, he played only for the Double-A Lynn Sailors that season. With Lynn, Nanni batted .249 with 90 hits, 14 doubles, 1 triple, 7 home runs, 40 RBIs, and 20 stolen bases in 116 games. On March 11, 1982, the Mariners re-signed Nanni. That season, Nanni continued to play for the Double-A Lynn Sailors. On August 27, Nanni hit a game winning three-run home run in the bottom of the ninth inning of a game against the Holyoke Millers. He batted .203 with 7 runs scored, 13 hits, 2 doubles, 2 triples, 1 home runs, 7 RBIs, and 2 stolen bases in 1234 games that season. He was first on the team in hits; tied for first in doubles; second in home runs, RBIs, and runs scored; and was third in triples.

In 1983, Nanni was promoted to the Triple-A Salt Lake City Gulls of the Pacific Coast League. He batted .240 with 100 hits, 18 doubles, 5 triples, 11 home runs, 57 RBIs, and 28 stolen bases in 122 games. He demanded a trade during the off-season, because as Nanni saw it, he did not fit into the Mariners organization due to their outfield depth. The team ignored his request and his last season in the Mariners' organization would come in the 1984 season with the Triple-A Salt Lake City Gulls. He batted .273 with 127 hits, 23 doubles, 7 triples, and 6 home runs in 135 games. Nanni was tied for first with Jamie Allen in doubles; and was third in hits, and triples.

=== Later career ===
In 1985, Nanni spent spring training with the Chicago Cubs and on March 22, he was reassigned to their minor league camp. On April 2, before the start of the season, Nanni was traded to the California Angels for pitcher Ángel Moreno. California then assigned Nanni to the Double-A Midland Angels of the Texas League. He batted .263 with 44 hits, 6 doubles, and 4 home runs in 53 games with Midland that season. Nanni later wound-up in the Toronto Blue Jays organization where he was assigned to the Triple-A Syracuse Chiefs. He finished out the 1985 season with the Chiefs batting .200 with 12 hits, 3 doubles, 1 triple, and 1 home run in 18 games.

Nani spoke to Ted Silary of the Philadelphia Daily News in 1985 on not living up to his potential since he was drafted sixth overall in 1978. He said, "As far as tools go [...] hey, that's why I was drafted so high. You ask anybody, I had every possible tool coming out of high school — hit, hit for power, run, throw, field. Still have them too. Know what my biggest problem has been? Consistency, concentration. I don't always tune into things as well as I should. [...] There have been periods of brilliance, times when I've looked like a superstar. But I've also looked like a Little Leaguer."

== Personal and later life ==
Nanni was born on December 3, 1959 in Philadelphia, Pennsylvania to Tito Nanni Sr., an Italian American school administrator, and Rita Bryson Nanni, an Irish American homemaker. Tito Nanni Jr was the eldest of nine children. Nanni is the uncle of Ryan Nanni who played for the University of Delaware baseball team. He was the Philadelphia Daily News Player of the year, like his uncle, in 2005.

Following his retirement from baseball, Nanni moved to Utah. He was named by the Philadelphia Daily News to the 10-year All-City First Team, a selection of Philadelphia high school baseball players who were dominant from 1977 to 1987.
