= Dick Vertlieb =

American sports executive (1930–2008)

- Born: October 7, 1930; Watts, Los Angeles, California, U.S.
- Died: December 5, 2008 (aged 78); Las Vegas, Nevada, U.S.
- Occupation: Sports executive

Richard Harvey Vertlieb (October 7, 1930 – December 5, 2008) was an American sports executive. He was the winner of the 1975 NBA Executive of the Year Award after serving as general manager for the NBA Champion Golden State Warriors. He also served as general manager for the Seattle SuperSonics and Indiana Pacers, as well as the Seattle Mariners of Major League Baseball.

== Early life ==
Dick Vertlieb was born in Watts, Los Angeles, California. He graduated from the University of Southern California, and also served in the United States Army.

== Career ==
Vertlieb had a desire to operate a sports team despite being a stock trader. Together, with Don Richman, the two found a worthy city with an arena in Seattle, Washington to go with finding people who would play as front men with Gene Klein and Sam Schulman while the two got to work on raising money to help pay the expansion fee. Richman and Vertlieb came up with the name of the team while the latter picked green and gold for the colors. On January 11, 1967, the Seattle SuperSonics were born, with Vertlieb being the business manager. During his time in Seattle, he named Lenny Wilkens as the head coach; Wilkens has gone on to become the coach with most career victories in NBA history. Vertlieb was noted for his temper, which could range from pushing his fist through a wall when seeing a part of the publicity brochure that did not make sense to him to even rush the court to confront Gus Johnson on the court after he had gotten into a fight with Sonics head coach Al Bianchi that saw Vertlieb take a few punches; he received a $500 fine from the league that saw the possibility of it being rescinded if he "seek[ed] psychiatric help". He also once cracked that "Basketball is one of the two most exciting indoor sports, and the other one shouldn't have spectators." Vertlieb left the Sonics in 1969. In 1971, he served as a consultant for the group that would soon establish the Portland Trail Blazers. He soon became a minority owner of the Seattle Sounders of the North American Soccer League. Years later, he served as a key piece in helping secure the establishment of the Seattle Seahawks via the Nordstrom family. Apparently, it was his efforts in trying to engineer a sale of the Golden State Warriors to Northwest investors (which failed) that impressed team owner Franklin Mieuli to hire Vertlieb as the general manager. In 1974, Vertlieb went to the Golden State Warriors, where he gave the team a facelift, most notably trading Nate Thurmond in mid-season to the Chicago Bulls for Clifford Ray and cash in six figures; head coach Al Attles credited Vertlieb and the trade for helping in making the season "one of those magical years." The Warriors made it to the NBA Finals by beating the Bulls in the Western Conference Finals before reaching the NBA Finals against the Washington Bullets, who the Warriors swept in four games. His temper in Seattle did not subside, with one instance seeing him react to a last-second call that cost his team a victory by kicking an iron police banner that resulted in him breaking his foot. He returned the Warriors to the Western Conference final the following year, but the team was defeated by the Phoenix Suns, who then lost to the Boston Celtics in the finals. Vertlieb then returned to Seattle to serve as the first ever GM for the Seattle Mariners in the summer of 1976 as they began play in Major League Baseball for 1977. He hired Dave Niehaus to serve as the play-by-paly broadcaster, which was likely the highlight of an otherwise miserable two seasons for Vertlieb (Niehaus would do Mariner commentary for over three decades). Vertlieb stated in later years that he had wanted to name the team the "Pros" and even have them dress up in black (similarly, he wanted to dress the Sonics in blue and gold to match Olympia Beer). Vertlieb's final GM job came in 1980–81 with the Indiana Pacers. In 1995, he served a brief stint as a consultant for the expansion Vancouver Grizzlies of the NBA, before becoming involved with the World League's Amsterdam Admirals for five years.

== Personal life and death ==
Vertlieb had one child with his wife Joan, who preceded him in death. He lived in Las Vegas, Nevada in his later years while ailing from stomach cancer and other illnesses. He died in Las Vegas on December 5, 2008; he had arranged for his ashes to be spread across the Northwest.
