= 1983 Detroit Tigers season =

Major League Baseball season

1983 Detroit Tigers
- League: American League
- Division: East
- Ballpark: Tiger Stadium
- City: Detroit, Michigan
- Record: 92–70 (.568)
- Divisional place: 2nd
- Owners: Tom Monaghan
- General managers: Jim Campbell
- Managers: Sparky Anderson
- Television: WDIV-TV (George Kell, Al Kaline); ONTV (Larry Adderley, Hank Aguirre, Norm Cash)
- Radio: WJR (Ernie Harwell, Paul Carey)

The 1983 Detroit Tigers season was the team's 83rd season and the 72nd season at Tiger Stadium. The Tigers finished in second place in the American League East with a record of 92–70 (.568), six games behind the Orioles. The Tigers outscored their opponents 789 to 679. The Tigers drew 1,829,636 fans to Tiger Stadium in 1983, ranking 8th of the 14 teams in the American League.

== Offseason ==
- February 21, 1983: Dave Revering was signed as a free agent by the Tigers.
- March 15, 1983: Julio González was signed as a free agent by the Tigers.
- March 25, 1983: Stine Poole (minors) and cash were traded by Tigers to the Minnesota Twins for Sal Butera.

== Regular season ==
=== Season standings ===
AL East
Team	W	L	Pct.	GB	Home	Road
Baltimore Orioles	98	64	.605	—	50‍–‍31	48‍–‍33
Detroit Tigers	92	70	.568	6	48‍–‍33	44‍–‍37
New York Yankees	91	71	.562	7	51‍–‍30	40‍–‍41
Toronto Blue Jays	89	73	.549	9	48‍–‍33	41‍–‍40
Milwaukee Brewers	87	75	.537	11	52‍–‍29	35‍–‍46
Boston Red Sox	78	84	.481	20	38‍–‍43	40‍–‍41
Cleveland Indians	70	92	.432	28	36‍–‍45	34‍–‍47

=== Record vs. opponents ===
1983 American League record Sources:
Team	BAL	BOS	CAL	CWS	CLE	DET	KC	MIL	MIN	NYY	OAK	SEA	TEX	TOR
Baltimore	—	8–5	7–5	7–5	6–7	5–8	8–4	11–2	8–4	6–7	8–4	8–4	9–3	7–6
Boston	5–8	—	6–6	6–6	7–6	4–9	5–7	4–9	5–7	7–6	8–4	7–5	7–5	7–6
California	5–7	6–6	—	3–10	8–4	4–8	6–7	6–6	6–7	5–7	5–8	6–7	6–7	4–8
Chicago	5–7	6–6	10–3	—	8–4	8–4	9–4	4–8	8–5	8–4	8–5	12–1	8–5	5–7
Cleveland	7–6	6–7	4–8	4–8	—	5–8	7–5	3–10	6–6	6–7	7–5	8–4	3–9	4–9
Detroit	8–5	9–4	8–4	4–8	8–5	—	7–5	6–7	9–3	5–8	6–6	8–4	8–4	6–7
Kansas City	4–8	7–5	7–6	4–9	5–7	5–7	—	6–6	6–7	6–6	7–6	8–5	8–5–1	6–6
Milwaukee	2–11	9–4	6–6	8–4	10–3	7–6	6–6	—	8–4	4–9	6–6	5–7	8–4	8–5
Minnesota	4–8	7–5	7–6	5–8	6–6	3–9	7–6	4–8	—	4–8	4–9	9–4	5–8	5–7
New York	7–6	6–7	7–5	4–8	7–6	8–5	6–6	9–4	8–4	—	8–4	7–5	7–5	7–6
Oakland	4–8	4–8	8–5	5–8	5–7	6–6	6–7	6–6	9–4	4–8	—	9–4	2–11	6–6
Seattle	4–8	5–7	7–6	1–12	4–8	4–8	5–8	7–5	4–9	5–7	4–9	—	6–7	4–8
Texas	3–9	5–7	7–6	5–8	9–3	4–8	5–8–1	4–8	8–5	5–7	11–2	7–6	—	4–8
Toronto	6–7	6–7	8–4	7–5	9–4	7–6	6–6	5–8	7–5	6–7	6–6	8–4	8–4	—

=== Notable transactions ===
- June 6, 1983: 1983 Major League Baseball draft
  - Jeff Robinson was drafted by the Tigers in the 3rd round.
  - D. J. Dozier was drafted by the Tigers in the 18th round, but did not sign.
- June 30, 1983: Pat Underwood was traded by the Tigers to the Cincinnati Reds for Wayne Krenchicki.

=== Roster ===
1983 Detroit Tigers
Roster
Pitchers: 24 Glenn Abbott; 60 Howard Bailey; 24,40 Doug Bair; 44 Juan Berenguer; 43 Dave Gumpert; 24 Bob James; 29 Aurelio López; 33 John Martin; 47 Jack Morris; 22 Larry Pashnick; 46 Dan Petry; 19 Dave Rozema; 18 Dave Rucker; 28 Jerry Ujdur; 40 Pat Underwood; 39 Milt Wilcox	Catchers: 25 Sal Butera; 17 Bill Fahey; 13 Lance Parrish; Infielders: 16 Tom Brookens; 21 Enos Cabell; 8 Marty Castillo; 10 Julio González; 15 Mike Ivie; 5,20 Howard Johnson; 15 Wayne Krenchicki; 4 Mike Laga; 7 Rick Leach; 3 Alan Trammell; 1 Lou Whitaker	Outfielders: 30 Johnny Grubb; 31 Larry Herndon; 35 Lynn Jones; 34 Chet Lemon; 12 Glenn Wilson; Other batters: 23 Kirk Gibson; 37 Bob Molinaro; 18 Bill Nahorodny; 14 John Wockenfuss	Manager: 11 Sparky Anderson; Coaches: 26 Gates Brown; 50 Billy Consolo; 38 Roger Craig; 51 Alex Grammas; 53 Dick Tracewski

== Player stats ==
= Indicates team leader

=== Batting ===
==== Starters by position ====
Note: Pos = Position; G = Games played; AB = At bats; H = Hits; Avg. = Batting average; HR = Home runs; RBI = Runs batted in

Pos	Player	G	AB	H	Avg.	HR	RBI
C	Lance Parrish	155	605	163	.269	27	114
1B	Enos Cabell	121	392	122	.311	5	46
2B	Lou Whitaker	161	643	206	.320	12	72
3B	Tom Brookens	138	332	71	.214	6	32
SS	Alan Trammell	142	505	161	.319	14	66
CF	Chet Lemon	145	491	125	.255	24	69
RF	Glenn Wilson	144	503	135	.268	11	65
LF	Larry Herndon	153	603	182	.302	20	92
DH	Kirk Gibson	128	401	91	.227	15	51

==== Other batters ====
Note: G = Games played; AB = At bats; H = Hits; Avg. = Batting average; HR = Home runs; RBI = Runs batted in

Player	G	AB	H	Avg.	HR	RBI
John Wockenfuss	92	245	66	.269	9	44
Rick Leach	99	242	60	.248	3	26
Johnny Grubb	57	134	34	.254	4	22
Wayne Krenchicki	59	133	37	.278	1	22
Marty Castillo	67	119	23	.193	2	16
Howard Johnson	27	66	14	.212	3	5
Lynn Jones	49	64	17	.266	0	6
Mike Ivie	12	42	9	.214	0	7
Bill Fahey	19	22	6	.273	0	2
Julio González	12	21	3	.143	0	2
Mike Laga	12	21	4	.190	0	2
Sal Butera	4	5	1	.200	0	0
Bob Molinaro	8	2	0	.000	0	0
Bill Nahorodny	2	1	0	.000	0	0

=== Pitching ===
==== Starting pitchers ====
Note: G = Games; IP = Innings pitched; W = Wins; L = Losses; ERA = Earned run average; SO = Strikeouts

Player	G	IP	W	L	ERA	SO
Jack Morris	37	293.2	20	13	3.34	232
Dan Petry	38	266.1	19	11	3.92	122
Milt Wilcox	26	186.0	11	10	3.97	101
Juan Berenguer	37	157.2	9	5	3.14	129
Glenn Abbott	7	46.2	2	1	1.93	11

==== Other pitchers ====
Note: G = Games pitched; IP = Innings pitched; W = Wins; L = Losses; ERA = Earned run average; SO = Strikeouts

Player	G	IP	W	L	ERA	SO
Dave Rozema	29	105.0	8	3	3.43	63
Larry Pashnick	12	37.2	1	3	5.26	17
Jerry Ujdur	11	34.0	0	4	7.15	13
Dave Rucker	4	9.0	1	2	17.00	6

==== Relief pitchers ====
Note: G = Games pitched; W= Wins; L= Losses; SV = Saves; GF = Games Finished; ERA = Earned run average; SO = Strikeouts

Player	G	W	L	SV	GF	ERA	SO
Aurelio López	57	9	8	18	46	2.81	90
Howard Bailey	33	5	5	0	15	4.88	21
Doug Bair	27	7	3	4	10	3.88	39
Dave Gumpert	26	0	2	2	17	2.64	14
John Martin	15	0	0	1	5	7.43	11
Pat Underwood	4	0	0	0	2	8.71	2
Bob James	4	0	0	0	3	11.25	4

== Award winners and league leaders ==
Kirk Gibson

- #2 in AL in triples (9)
- #10 in AL in Power/Speed Number (14.5)

Larry Herndon

- #2 in AL in triples (9)
- #8 in AL in hits (182)
- #10 in AL in at bats (603)
- #10 in AL in total bases (288)

Chet Lemon

- AL leader in times hit by pitch (20)

Aurelio López

- AL All Star Team, pitcher

Jack Morris

- AL leader in strikeouts (232)
- AL leader in innings pitched (293-2/3)
- AL leader in wild pitches (18)
- AL leader in batters faced (1204)
- #2 in AL in strikeouts per 9 innings pitched (7.11)
- #2 in AL in games started (37)
- #2 in AL in complete games (20)
- #2 in AL in strikeout to walk ratio (2.80)
- #4 in AL in wins (20)
- #4 in AL in walks plus hits per innings pitched (WHIP) (1.158)
- #4 in AL in hits allowed (257)
- #5 in AL in home runs allowed (30)

Lance Parrish

- AL Gold Glove Award, catcher
- AL Silver Slugger Award, catcher
- AL All Star Team, catcher
- AL leader in runners caught stealing (54)
- AL leader in sacrifice flies (13)
- Finished 9th in AL MVP voting
- #3 in doubles (42)
- #3 in AL in extra base hits (72)
- #4 in AL in RBIs (114)
- #6 in AL in outs (479)
- #8 in AL in total bases (292)
- #9 in AL in home runs (27)
- #9 in AL in at bats (605)
- #9 in AL in strikeouts (106)
- #9 in AL in times grounded into double plays (21)

Dan Petry

- AL leader in games started (38)
- AL leader in home runs allowed (37)
- #2 in AL in earned runs allowed (116)
- #2 in AL in wild pitches (12)
- #3 in AL in innings pitched (266-1/3)
- #3 in AL in bases on balls allowed (99)
- #3 in AL in batters faced (1115)
- #5 in AL in wins (19)
- #5 in AL in hits allowed (256)

Alan Trammell

- AL Gold Glove Award, shortstop
- AL leader in sacrifice hits (15)
- Finished 15th in AL MVP voting
- #4 in AL in batting average (.319)
- #5 in AL in Power/Speed Number (19.1)
- #8 in AL in on-base percentage (.385)
- #9 in AL in times caught stealing (10)

Lou Whitaker

- AL Gold Glove Award, second baseman
- AL Silver Slugger Award, second baseman
- AL All Star Team, second baseman
- AL leader in games played at second base (160)
- Tiger of the Year Award, by Detroit baseball writers
- Finished 8th in AL MVP voting
- #2 in AL in plate appearances (720)
- #2 in AL in singles (148)
- #2 in AL in times on base (273)
- #3 in AL in batting average (.320)
- #3 in AL in hits (206)
- #3 in AL in at bats (643)
- #4 in AL in games (161)
- #5 in AL in runs created (114)
- #7 in AL in total bases (294)
- #7 in AL in doubles (40)
- #7 in AL in sacrifice flies (8)
- #9 in AL in times caught stealing (10)

Milt Wilcox

- #4 in AL in wild pitches (10)

=== Players ranking among top 100 all time at position ===
The following members of the 1983 Detroit Tigers are among the Top 100 of all time at their position, as ranked by The Bill James Historical Baseball Abstract:

- Lance Parrish: 19th best catcher of all time
- Lou Whitaker: 13th best second baseman of all time
- Alan Trammell: 9th best shortstop of all time
- Kirk Gibson: 36th best left fielder of all time

== Farm system ==
Level	Team	League	Manager
AAA	Evansville Triplets	American Association	Gordon Mackenzie
AA	Birmingham Barons	Southern League	Roy Majtyka
A	Lakeland Tigers	Florida State League	Ted Brazell
Rookie	Bristol Tigers	Appalachian League	Boots Day

LEAGUE CHAMPIONS: Birmingham
