= 1982 Detroit Tigers season =

Major League Baseball season

1982 Detroit Tigers
- League: American League
- Division: East
- Ballpark: Tiger Stadium
- City: Detroit, Michigan
- Record: 83–79 (.512)
- Divisional place: 4th
- Owners: John Fetzer
- General managers: Jim Campbell
- Managers: Sparky Anderson
- Television: WDIV-TV (George Kell, Al Kaline); ONTV (Larry Adderley, Hank Aguirre, Norm Cash)
- Radio: WJR (Ernie Harwell, Paul Carey)

The 1982 Detroit Tigers season was the team's 82nd season and the 71st season at Tiger Stadium. The Tigers finished in fourth place in the American League East with a record of 83–79 (.512), 12 games behind the AL Champion Brewers. The Tigers outscored their opponents 729 to 685. The Tigers drew 1,636,058 fans to Tiger Stadium in 1982, ranking 7th of the 14 teams in the American League.

== Offseason ==
- October 5, 1981: Mark Fidrych was released by the Tigers.
- December 9, 1981: Dan Schatzeder and Mike Chris were traded by the Tigers to the San Francisco Giants for Larry Herndon.
- December 14, 1981: Dennis Kinney was released by the Tigers.
- March 4, 1982: Champ Summers was traded by the Tigers to the San Francisco Giants for Enos Cabell and cash.

== Regular season ==
=== Season standings ===
AL East
Team	W	L	Pct.	GB	Home	Road
Milwaukee Brewers	95	67	.586	—	48‍–‍34	47‍–‍33
Baltimore Orioles	94	68	.580	1	53‍–‍28	41‍–‍40
Boston Red Sox	89	73	.549	6	49‍–‍32	40‍–‍41
Detroit Tigers	83	79	.512	12	47‍–‍34	36‍–‍45
New York Yankees	79	83	.488	16	42‍–‍39	37‍–‍44
Cleveland Indians	78	84	.481	17	41‍–‍40	37‍–‍44
Toronto Blue Jays	78	84	.481	17	44‍–‍37	34‍–‍47

=== Record vs. opponents ===
1982 American League record Sources:
Team	BAL	BOS	CAL	CWS	CLE	DET	KC	MIL	MIN	NYY	OAK	SEA	TEX	TOR
Baltimore	—	4–9	7–5	5–7	6–7	7–6	4–8	9–4–1	8–4	11–2	7–5	7–5	9–3	10–3
Boston	9–4	—	7–5	4–8	6–7	8–5	6–6	4–9	6–6	7–6	8–4	7–5	10–2	7–6
California	5–7	5–7	—	8–5	8–4	5–7	7–6	6–6	7–6	7–5	9–4	10–3	8–5	8–4
Chicago	7–5	8–4	5–8	—	6–6	9–3	3–10	3–9	7–6	8–4	9–4	6–7	8–5	8–4
Cleveland	7–6	7–6	4–8	6–6	—	6–7	2–10	7–6	8–4	4–9	4–8	9–3	7–5	7–6
Detroit	6–7	5–8	7–5	3–9	7–6	—	6–6	3–10	9–3	8–5	9–3	6–6	8–4	6–7
Kansas City	8–4	6–6	6–7	10–3	10–2	6–6	—	7–5	7–6	5–7	7–6	7–6	7–6	4–8
Milwaukee	4–9–1	9–4	6–6	9–3	6–7	10–3	5–7	—	7–5	8–5	7–5	8–4	7–5	9–4
Minnesota	4–8	6–6	6–7	6–7	4–8	3–9	6–7	5–7	—	2–10	3–10	5–8	5–8	5–7
New York	2–11	6–7	5–7	4–8	9–4	5–8	7–5	5–8	10–2	—	7–5	6–6	7–5	6–7
Oakland	5–7	4–8	4–9	4–9	8–4	3–9	6–7	5–7	10–3	5–7	—	6–7	5–8	3–9
Seattle	5–7	5–7	3–10	7–6	3–9	6–6	6–7	4–8	8–5	6–6	7–6	—	9–4	7–5
Texas	3–9	2–10	5–8	5–8	5–7	4–8	6–7	5–7	8–5	5–7	8–5	4–9	—	4–8
Toronto	3–10	6–7	4–8	4–8	6–7	7–6	8–4	4–9	7–5	7–6	9–3	5–7	8–4	—

=== Roster ===
1982 Detroit Tigers
Roster
Pitchers: 60 Howard Bailey; 44 Juan Berenguer; 43 Dave Gumpert; 24 Bob James; 29 Aurelio López; 47 Jack Morris; 22 Larry Pashnick; 46 Dan Petry; 42 Larry Rothschild; 19 Dave Rozema; 49 Dave Rucker; 33 Kevin Saucier; 36 Elías Sosa; 45 Dave Tobik; 28 Jerry Ujdur; 40 Pat Underwood; 39 Milt Wilcox	Catchers: 8 Marty Castillo; 17 Bill Fahey; 13 Lance Parrish; 14 John Wockenfuss; Infielders: 16 Tom Brookens; 21 Enos Cabell; 25 Mark DeJohn; 2 Richie Hebner; 5 Howard Johnson; 18 Mick Kelleher; 4 Mike Laga; 7 Rick Leach; 3 Alan Trammell; 1 Lou Whitaker	Outfielders: 23 Kirk Gibson; 31 Larry Herndon; 35 Lynn Jones; 34 Chet Lemon; 27 Eddie Miller; 12 Glenn Wilson; Other batters: 15 Mike Ivie; 20 Jerry Turner	Manager: 11 Sparky Anderson; Coaches: 26 Gates Brown; 50 Billy Consolo; 38 Roger Craig; 51 Alex Grammas; 53 Dick Tracewski

== Player stats ==
= Indicates team leader

=== Batting ===
==== Starters by position ====
Note: Pos = Position; G = Games played; AB = At bats; H = Hits; Avg. = Batting average; HR = Home runs; RBI = Runs batted in

Pos	Player	G	AB	H	Avg.	HR	RBI
C	Lance Parrish	133	486	138	.284	32	87
1B	Enos Cabell	125	464	121	.261	2	37
2B	Lou Whitaker	152	560	160	.286	15	65
3B	Tom Brookens	140	398	92	.231	9	58
SS	Alan Trammell	157	489	126	.258	9	57
LF	Larry Herndon	157	614	179	.292	23	88
RF	Chet Lemon	125	436	116	.266	19	52
CF	Glenn Wilson	84	322	94	.292	12	34
DH	Mike Ivie	80	259	60	.232	14	38

==== Other batters ====
Note: G = Games played; AB = At bats; H = Hits; Avg. = Batting average; HR = Home runs; RBI = Runs batted in

Player	G	AB	H	Avg.	HR	RBI
Kirk Gibson	69	266	74	.278	8	35
Rick Leach	82	218	52	.239	3	12
Jerry Turner	85	210	52	.248	8	27
John Wockenfuss	70	193	58	.301	8	32
Richie Hebner	68	179	49	.274	8	18
Howard Johnson	54	155	49	.316	4	14
Lynn Jones	58	139	31	.223	0	14
Mike Laga	27	88	23	.261	3	11
Bill Fahey	28	67	10	.149	0	4
Eddie Miller	14	25	1	.040	0	0
Mark DeJohn	24	21	4	.190	0	1
Mick Kelleher	2	1	0	.000	0	0
Manny Castillo	1	0	0	----	0	0

Note: pitchers' batting statistics not included

=== Pitching ===
==== Starting pitchers ====
Note: G = Games; IP = Innings pitched; W = Wins; L = Losses; ERA = Earned run average; SO = Strikeouts

Player	G	IP	W	L	ERA	SO
Jack Morris	37	266.1	17	16	4.06	135
Dan Petry	35	246.0	15	9	3.22	132
Milt Wilcox	29	193.2	12	10	3.62	112
Jerry Ujdur	25	178.0	10	10	3.69	86

==== Other pitchers ====
Note: G = Games pitched; IP = Innings pitched; W = Wins; L = Losses; ERA = Earned run average; SO = Strikeouts

Player	G	IP	W	L	ERA	SO
Pat Underwood	33	99.0	4	8	4.73	43
Larry Pashnick	28	94.1	4	4	4.01	19
Dave Rozema	8	27.2	3	0	1.63	15
Juan Berenguer	2	6.2	0	0	6.75	8

==== Relief pitchers ====
Note: G = Games pitched; W= Wins; L= Losses; SV = Saves; GF = Games finished; ERA = Earned run average; SO = Strikeouts

Player	G	W	L	SV	GF	ERA	SO
Dave Tobik	51	4	9	9	31	3.56	63
Elías Sosa	38	3	3	4	27	4.43	24
Kevin Saucier	31	3	1	5	14	3.12	23
Dave Rucker	27	5	6	0	8	3.38	31
Aurelio López	19	3	1	3	9	5.27	26
Bob James	12	0	2	0	6	5.03	20
Howard Bailey	8	0	0	1	5	0.00	3
Dave Gumpert	5	0	0	1	2	27.00	0
Larry Rothschild	2	0	0	0	0	13.50	0

== Award winners and league leaders ==
Larry Herndon

- #2 in MLB in triples (13)
- #5 in AL in outs (470)
- #8 in MLB in times grounded into double plays (20)

Chet Lemon

- MLB leader in times hit by pitch (15)

Jack Morris

- #2 in AL in complete games (17)
- #2 in MLB in home runs allowed (37)
- #2 in MLB in earned runs allowed (120)
- #2 in AL in wild pitches (10)
- #2 in AL in batters faced (1107)
- #3 in AL in innings pitched (266-1/3)
- #4 in AL in shutouts (3)
- #4 in AL in losses (16)
- #5 in AL in wins (17)
- #5 in AL in games started (37)
- #8 in MLB in bases on balls allowed (96)

Lance Parrish

- AL Silver Slugger Award, catcher
- AL All Star Team, catcher
- Tiger of the Year Award, by Detroit baseball writers
- #4 in AL in at bats per home run (15.2)
- #5 in AL in home runs (32)
- #10 in MLB in slugging percentage (.529)

Dan Petry

- #4 in AL in ERA (3.22)
- #4 in AL in bases on balls allowed (100)
- #5 in AL in wild pitches (9)

Jerry Ujdur

- #2 in AL in hits allowed per 9 innings pitched (7.58)

Milt Wilcox

- #3 in AL in hit batsmen (7)

=== Players ranking among top 100 all time at position ===
The following members of the 1982 Detroit Tigers are among the Top 100 of all time at their position, as ranked by The Bill James Historical Baseball Abstract:

- Lance Parrish: 19th best catcher of all time
- Lou Whitaker: 13th best second baseman of all time
- Alan Trammell: 9th best shortstop of all time
- Kirk Gibson: 36th best left fielder of all time

== Farm system ==
Level	Team	League	Manager
AAA	Evansville Triplets	American Association	Roy Majtyka
AA	Birmingham Barons	Southern League	Eddie Brinkman
A	Lakeland Tigers	Florida State League	Bruce Kimm
A	Macon Peaches	South Atlantic League	Ted Brazell
Rookie	Bristol Tigers	Appalachian League	Boots Day
