= 1980 Detroit Tigers season =

Major League Baseball season

1980 Detroit Tigers
- League: American League
- Division: East
- Ballpark: Tiger Stadium
- City: Detroit, Michigan
- Record: 84–78 (.519)
- Divisional place: 5th
- Owners: John Fetzer
- General managers: Jim Campbell
- Managers: Sparky Anderson
- Television: WDIV-TV (George Kell, Al Kaline)
- Radio: WJR (Ernie Harwell, Paul Carey)

The 1980 Detroit Tigers season was the team's 80th season and the 69th season at Tiger Stadium. The Tigers finished in fifth place in the American League East with a record of 84–78, 19 games behind the Yankees. They outscored their opponents 830 to 757. The Tigers drew 1,785,293 fans to Tiger Stadium in 1980, ranking 7th of the 14 teams in the American League. This was Sparky Anderson's first full season as Tigers manager.

== Offseason ==
- December 7, 1979: Ron LeFlore was traded by the Tigers to the Montreal Expos for Dan Schatzeder.

== Regular season ==
=== Season standings ===
AL East
Team	W	L	Pct.	GB	Home	Road
New York Yankees	103	59	.636	—	53‍–‍28	50‍–‍31
Baltimore Orioles	100	62	.617	3	50‍–‍31	50‍–‍31
Milwaukee Brewers	86	76	.531	17	40‍–‍42	46‍–‍34
Boston Red Sox	83	77	.519	19	36‍–‍45	47‍–‍32
Detroit Tigers	84	78	.519	19	43‍–‍38	41‍–‍40
Cleveland Indians	79	81	.494	23	44‍–‍35	35‍–‍46
Toronto Blue Jays	67	95	.414	36	35‍–‍46	32‍–‍49

Boston's record of 83–77 has a fractionally better winning percentage than Detroit's record of 84–78; .51875 and .51851, respectively.

=== Record vs. opponents ===
1980 American League record Sources:
Team	BAL	BOS	CAL	CWS	CLE	DET	KC	MIL	MIN	NYY	OAK	SEA	TEX	TOR
Baltimore	—	8–5	10–2	6–6	6–7	10–3	6–6	7–6	10–2	7–6	7–5	6–6	6–6	11–2
Boston	5–8	—	9–3	6–4	7–6	8–5	5–7	6–7	6–6	3–10	9–3	7–5	5–7	7–6
California	2–10	3–9	—	3–10	4–6	5–7	5–8	6–6	7–6	2–10	3–10	11–2	11–2	3–9
Chicago	6–6	4–6	10–3	—	5–7	2–10	5–8	5–7	5–8	5–7	6–7	6–7	6–7–2	5–7
Cleveland	7–6	6–7	6–4	7–5	—	3–10	5–7	3–10	9–3	5–8	6–6	8–4	6–6	8–5
Detroit	3–10	5–8	7–5	10–2	10–3	—	2–10	7–6	6–6	5–8	6–6	10–2–1	4–8	9–4
Kansas City	6–6	7–5	8–5	8–5	7–5	10–2	—	6–6	5–8	8–4	6–7	7–6	10–3	9–3
Milwaukee	6–7	7–6	6–6	7–5	10–3	6–7	6–6	—	7–5	5–8	7–5	9–3	5–7	5–8
Minnesota	2–10	6–6	6–7	8–5	3–9	6–6	8–5	5–7	—	4–8	6–7	7–6	9–3	7–5
New York	6–7	10–3	10–2	7–5	8–5	8–5	4–8	8–5	8–4	—	8–4	9–3	7–5	10–3
Oakland	5–7	3–9	10–3	7–6	6–6	6–6	7–6	5–7	7–6	4–8	—	8–5	7–6	8–4
Seattle	6–6	5–7	2–11	7–6	4–8	2–10–1	6–7	3–9	6–7	3–9	5–8	—	4–9	6–6
Texas	6–6	7–5	2–11	7–6–2	6–6	8–4	3–10	7–5	3–9	5–7	6–7	9–4	—	7–5
Toronto	2–11	6–7	9–3	7–5	5–8	4–9	3–9	8–5	5–7	3–10	4–8	6–6	5–7	—

=== Notable transactions ===
- June 2, 1980: Al Greene and John Martin were traded by the Tigers to the St. Louis Cardinals for Jim Lentine.
- June 3, 1980: Chuck Hensley was drafted by the Tigers in the 10th round of the 1980 Major League Baseball draft.
- June 6, 1980: Bárbaro Garbey was signed as an amateur free agent by the Tigers.
- September 21, 1980: Roger Mason was signed as an amateur free agent by the Tigers.

=== Roster ===
1980 Detroit Tigers
Roster
Pitchers: 41 Jack Billingham; 20 Mark Fidrych; 18 John Hiller; 29 Aurelio López; 47 Jack Morris; 46 Dan Petry; 48 Bruce Robbins; 19 Dave Rozema; 36 Dan Schatzeder; 38 Dave Tobik; 28 Jerry Ujdur; 40 Pat Underwood; 44 Roger Weaver; 39 Milt Wilcox	Catchers: 15 Duffy Dyer; 13 Lance Parrish; Infielders: 16 Tom Brookens; 25 Tim Corcoran; 2 Richie Hebner; 9 Stan Papi; 30 Jason Thompson; 3 Alan Trammell; 5 Mark Wagner; 1 Lou Whitaker; 14 John Wockenfuss	Outfielders: 10 Al Cowens; 23 Kirk Gibson; 34 Dan Gonzales; 35 Lynn Jones; 33 Steve Kemp; 27 Jim Lentine; 32 Rick Peters; 22 Dave Stegman; 24 Champ Summers	Manager: 11 Sparky Anderson; Coaches: 26 Gates Brown; 50 Billy Consolo; 52 Roger Craig; 51 Alex Grammas; 53 Dick Tracewski

== Player stats ==
= Indicates team leader

=== Batting ===
==== Starters by position ====
Note: Pos = Position; G = Games played; AB = At bats; H = Hits; Avg. = Batting average; HR = Home runs; RBI = Runs batted in

Pos	Player	G	AB	H	Avg.	HR	RBI
C	Lance Parrish	144	553	158	.286	24	82
1B	Richie Hebner	104	341	99	.290	12	82
2B	Lou Whitaker	145	477	111	.233	1	45
3B	Tom Brookens	151	509	140	.275	10	66
SS	Alan Trammell	146	560	168	.300	9	65
LF	Steve Kemp	135	508	149	.293	21	101
CF	Rick Peters	133	477	139	.291	2	42
RF	Al Cowens	108	403	113	.280	5	42
DH	Champ Summers	120	347	103	.297	17	60

==== Other batters ====
Note: G = Games played; AB = At bats; H = Hits; Avg. = Batting average; HR = Home runs; RBI = Runs batted in

Player	G	AB	H	Avg.	HR	RBI
John Wockenfuss	126	372	102	.274	16	65
Kirk Gibson	51	175	46	.263	9	16
Jim Lentine	67	161	42	.261	1	17
Tim Corcoran	84	153	44	.288	3	18
Dave Stegman	65	130	23	.177	2	9
Jason Thompson	36	126	27	.214	4	20
Stan Papi	46	114	27	.237	3	17
Duffy Dyer	48	108	20	.185	4	11
Mark Wagner	45	72	17	.236	0	3
Lynn Jones	30	55	14	.255	0	6
Dan Gonzales	2	7	1	.143	0	0

Note: pitchers' batting statistics not included

=== Pitching ===
==== Starting pitchers ====
Note: G = Games pitched; IP = Innings pitched; W = Wins; L = Losses; ERA = Earned run average; SO = Strikeouts

Player	G	IP	W	L	ERA	SO
Jack Morris	36	250.0	16	15	4.18	112
Milt Wilcox	32	198.2	13	11	4.48	97
Dan Schatzeder	32	192.2	11	13	4.02	94
Dan Petry	27	164.2	10	9	3.94	88
Mark Fidrych	9	44.1	2	3	5.68	16

==== Other pitchers ====
Note: G = Games pitched; IP = Innings pitched; W = Wins; L = Losses; ERA = Earned run average; SO = Strikeouts

Player	G	IP	W	L	ERA	SO
Dave Rozema	42	144.2	6	9	3.92	49
Roger Weaver	19	63.2	3	0	4.10	42
Bruce Robbins	15	51.2	4	2	6.62	23
Jerry Ujdur	9	21.1	1	0	7.59	8

==== Relief pitchers ====
Note: G = Games pitched; W = Wins; L = Losses; SV = Saves; GF = Games finished; ERA = Earned run average; SO = Strikeouts

Player	G	W	L	SV	GF	ERA	SO
Aurelio López	67	13	6	21	59	3.77	97
Pat Underwood	49	3	6	5	24	3.59	60
Dave Tobik	17	1	0	0	6	3.98	34
John Hiller	11	1	0	0	2	4.40	18
Jack Billingham	8	0	0	0	3	7.36	3

== Awards and honors ==
- Lance Parrish, AL Silver Slugger Award, catcher
- Alan Trammell, AL Gold Glove Award, shortstop
- Alan Trammell, Tiger of the Year Award, from Detroit sportswriters

=== All Star selections ===
- Lance Parrish, AL All Star Team, catcher
- Alan Trammell, AL All Star Team, shortstop

=== League top ten finishers ===
Steve Kemp

- #2 in MLB in time grounded into double plays (24)
- #5 in AL in sacrifice flies

Aurelio López

- #3 in AL in games (67)
- #3 in AL in games finished (59)

Jack Morris

- #3 in AL in earned runs allowed (116)
- #4 in AL in games started (36)
- #10 in MLB in bases on balls allowed (87)
- #10 in MLB in losses (15)

Lance Parrish

- #2 in MLB in time grounded into double plays (24)
- #4 in AL in strikeouts (109)
- #10 in MLB in extra base hits (64)

Alan Trammell

- #5 in AL in runs scored (107)
- #6 in AL in sacrifice hits (13)

Milt Wilcox

- #10 in MLB in complete games (13)

=== Players ranking among top 100 all time at position ===
The following members of the 1979 Detroit Tigers are among the Top 100 of all time at their position, as ranked by The Bill James Historical Baseball Abstract in 2001:

- Lance Parrish: 19th best catcher of all time
- Lou Whitaker: 13th best second baseman of all time
- Alan Trammell: 9th best shortstop of all time

== Farm system ==
Level	Team	League	Manager
AAA	Evansville Triplets	American Association	Jim Leyland
AA	Montgomery Rebels	Southern League	Roy Majtyka
A	Lakeland Tigers	Florida State League	Eddie Brinkman
Rookie	Bristol Tigers	Appalachian League	Tom Kotchman

== See also ==
- 1980 in Michigan
