= Roger Weaver =

American baseball player (born 1954)

- Pitcher
- Born: October 6, 1954 (age 71); Amsterdam, New York, U.S.
- Batted: Right Threw: Right

MLB debut
- June 6, 1980, for the Detroit Tigers

Last MLB appearance
- October 4, 1980, for the Detroit Tigers

MLB statistics
- Win–loss record: 3–4
- Earned run average: 4.10
- Strikeouts: 42
- Stats at Baseball Reference

Teams
- Detroit Tigers (1980)

Roger Edward Weaver (born October 6, 1954) is an American former professional baseball pitcher who played in Major League Baseball (MLB) for one season. He pitched in 19 games for the Detroit Tigers during the 1980 season.

Weaver is from St. Johnsville, New York and played college baseball for the Oneonta Red Dragons. At Oneonta, he pitched and played the outfield. As a junior in 1975, he had an earned run average (ERA) of 0.79. In April 1975, he threw a no-hitter against the Brooklyn Bulldogs which was marred only by a fielding error. Weaver received a degree in American history from Oneonta in 1976. He was selected by the Tigers in the 16th round of the 1976 MLB draft.

Weaver spent his first professional season with the Bristol Tigers and led the Appalachian League with a 1.43 ERA. He spent the following season with the Lakeland Tigers and led the Florida State League with 22 saves and finished third in the league with a 1.58 ERA. Weaver was sidelined by injury for most of the 1978 season but managed a 1.50 ERA in twelve innings pitched. His elbow tendinitis caused pain which carried over into the offseason and was "so intense" that he could not straighten his arm, had difficulty sleeping and planned to quit baseball and go into business with his father. Nonetheless, a year later, Evansville Triplets manager Jim Leyland called Weaver into his hotel room to tell him he was being called up to the major leagues.

Weaver made his major league debut on June 6, 1980 at Milwaukee County Stadium against the Milwaukee Brewers. He pitched 1 2/3 scoreless, hitless innings in relief of Dave Tobik. Weaver earned his first major league win on June 24, 1980 when he entered in relief of Dan Petry in the third inning and threw 3 1/3 scoreless innings. Describing the feeling of recording his first victory, he told reporters "it's the best!" In early July, Tigers pitching coach Roger Craig told Weaver that the organization planned to use him as a starting pitcher in the future, a role which he told the Detroit Free Press he preferred to pitching out of the bullpen. In early August, he was surprised to learn that he would be making his starting debut on August 3. However, by the third inning of his first major league start, he developed a blister on his right middle finger and was replaced by Dave Rozema to start the fourth. On or about August 17, the Tigers placed Weaver on the disabled list due to a sore shoulder. Weaver returned in time to finish the Major League season but his performance suffered. Through September 8, he had an ERA of 2.23; over his final six games, his ERA was 6.59.

He married Michele Lonsberry on October 17, 1987. Weaver has two sons, Zach and Michael Weaver, one daughter named Lauren.
