= Howard Bailey =

Howard Bailey may refer to:

- Howard Bailey (baseball) (born 1957), former Major League Baseball pitcher
- Chingy or Howard Bailey, Jr. (born 1980), American rapper
