= Dave Tobik =

American baseball pitcher (born 1953)

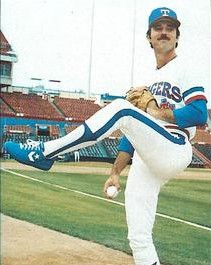
- Tobik with the Texas Rangers in 1983
- Pitcher
- Born: March 2, 1953 (age 73); Euclid, Ohio, U.S.
- Batted: Right Threw: Right

MLB debut
- August 26, 1978, for the Detroit Tigers

Last MLB appearance
- October 5, 1985, for the Seattle Mariners

MLB statistics
- Win–loss record: 14–23
- Earned run average: 3.70
- Strikeouts: 256
- Stats at Baseball Reference

Teams
- Detroit Tigers (1978–1982); Texas Rangers (1983–1984); Seattle Mariners (1985)

David Vance Tobik (/ˈtoʊbɪk/ TOH-bik; born March 2, 1953) is an American former right-handed professional baseball relief pitcher. After attending Ohio University, Tobik played eight seasons in the Major League Baseball (MLB) with the Detroit Tigers (1978–1982), Texas Rangers (1983–1984), and Seattle Mariners (1985).

== Career ==
=== Ohio University ===
Tobik played college baseball at Ohio University. He was an All-Mid-American Conference pitcher in 1974, with a 6–3 record, 78 strikeouts and an earned run average of 0.84. He was inducted into the Kermit Blosser Ohio Athletics Hall of Fame in 1989.

=== Detroit Tigers ===
In January 1975, Tobik was drafted by the Detroit Tigers in the first round (second overall) during the secondary phase of the January 1975 MLB draft.

From 1975 to 1977, he played for the Tigers' farm teams in Lakeland, Florida (the Lakeland Flying Tigers) and Montgomery, Alabama (the Montgomery Rebels). He moved up to the Triple-A Evansville Triplets in 1977 and played in Evansville for parts of the 1977 to 1980 seasons.

Tobik made his MLB debut on August 26, 1978, giving up three earned runs in a 9-5 loss to the Milwaukee Brewers. The following year, he appeared in 37 games for the 1979 Detroit Tigers. He spent most of the 1980 season in Evansville, but did appear in 17 games (all but one in relief) for the 1980 Tigers. On August 22, 1980, Tobik struck out four batters in one inning while pitching for Evansville against Denver, as La Rue Washington reached first base on a passed ball after being struck out by Tobik.

In 1981, Tobik compiled a record of 2–2 with a 2.69 earned run average (Adjusted ERA+ of 141) in 60 1/3 innings pitched.

In 1982, and after an injury sidelined Dave Rozema, Tobik became the Tigers' closer. In June 1982, Sparky Anderson credited Tobik's success to his development of a forkball and called Tobik the "king" of a Detroit bullpen that also included Kevin Saucier and Elías Sosa. Anderson added: "I admit, I didn't see it coming. But I'm smart enough to pounce on something good when I see it. We don't have anybody throwing like Tobik. That forkball of his is unreal." In May 1982, Tobik and Jack Morris combined for a two-hit shutout against the California Angels. In June 1982, Wade Boggs hit his first career home run off Tobik—an 11th inning walk-off home run that Boggs later recalled as a turning point in his early career. Tobik led the 1982 Tigers with nine saves, and appeared in a career-high 51 games, but also compiled a disappointing record of 4–9.

=== Texas Rangers ===
During spring training in 1983, Tobik was traded to the Texas Rangers for all-star outfielder Johnny Grubb. Playing for the Rangers in 1983, Tobik converted all nine of his save opportunities for the Rangers. Tobik pitched two seasons for the Rangers, appearing in 51 games, all in relief. In July 1984, the Rangers sent Tobik to Oklahoma City. On being sent to Oklahoma City, Tobik told reporters, "I don't know what to think anymore. I don't think they have to have a reason all the time for doing things. I'm a major league pitcher. I don't deserve this but what can you do?"

=== Seattle Mariners ===
In January 1985, Tobik signed with the Seattle Mariners and was assigned to the newly formed Calgary Cannons in the Pacific Coast League He won a career-high 12 games for the Cannons in 1985 and also established the team record for wins in a season. Tobik also compiled a 1–0 record for the Mariners in 1985. He appeared in his final game for the Mariners on October 5. At the end of the 1985 season, the Mariners asked for unconditional waivers on Tobik.

For his career, Tobik had a 14-23 record in 196 games. He had 28 saves and 116 games finished. His career ERA was 3.70 (Adjusted ERA+ 110).

== Personal life ==
Tobik married Anne Harter, whom he met while he played for the Evansville Triplets and she was a sports writer for the Evansville Press. They later divorced, and she died in 2023. They had two daughters and a son. Their son, Dan, played college baseball for the UT Martin Skyhawks. Dan pitched in the Los Angeles Angels organization for two season after he was selected in the 2013 MLB draft.

Tobik has lived in a suburb of St. Louis, Missouri.
