= Rusty Kuntz =

American baseball player and coach (born 1955)

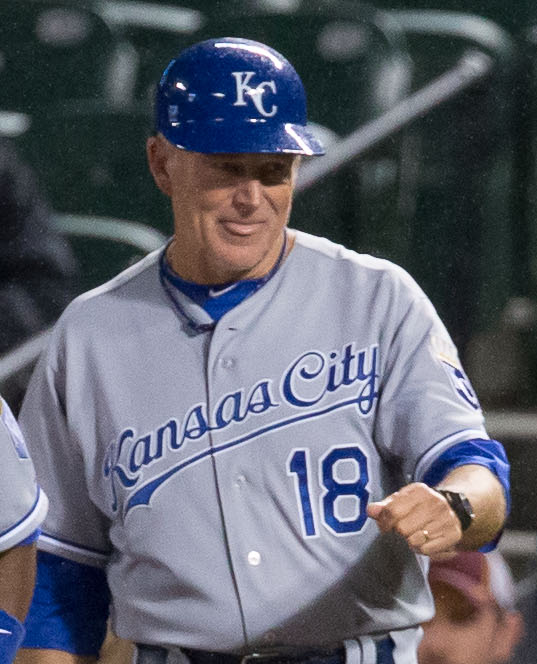
- Kuntz with the Royals in 2013

Kansas City Royals – No. 18
- Outfielder / Coach
- Born: February 4, 1955 (age 71); Orange, California, U.S.
- Batted: Right Threw: Right

MLB debut
- September 1, 1979, for the Chicago White Sox

Last MLB appearance
- April 24, 1985, for the Detroit Tigers

MLB statistics
- Batting average: .236
- Home runs: 5
- Runs batted in: 38
- Stats at Baseball Reference

Teams
- As player: Chicago White Sox (1979–1983); Minnesota Twins (1983); Detroit Tigers (1984–1985); As coach: Seattle Mariners (1989–1992); Florida Marlins (1995–1996, 1999–2000); Pittsburgh Pirates (2003–2005); Kansas City Royals (2008–2010, 2012–2017, 2021–present)

Career highlights and awards
- 2× World Series champion (1984, 2015)

Russell Jay Kuntz (/kuːnts/ KOONTS; born February 4, 1955) is an American baseball coach and former Major League Baseball (MLB) outfielder. He played for the Chicago White Sox, Minnesota Twins and Detroit Tigers between 1979 and 1985. He never appeared in more than 84 games in any season during his playing career. In the final game of the 1984 World Series, Kuntz hit a pop fly to the second baseman that became the deciding run batted in (RBI).

Kuntz grew up in Kansas and California, playing three sports in high school and community college. He went to the Division III World Series twice with California State University, Stanislaus before being selected by the White Sox in the 11th round of the 1977 Major League Baseball draft.

After the 1984 season, Kuntz was unable to return to form the next year. He was demoted to the minor leagues early in the 1985 season and was out of professional baseball as a player shortly thereafter.

Since his playing career ended, Kuntz has worked with several MLB organizations, including the Houston Astros, Seattle Mariners, Florida Marlins, Kansas City Royals, Atlanta Braves and Pittsburgh Pirates. He has worked as an assistant to the general manager, minor league coach, roving instructor and major league base coach. From 2012 to 2017, he served as the first base coach for the Kansas City Royals, and has received substantial praise for his contributions to the team's success during that period. "Rusty Kuntz," Royals manager Ned Yost has said, "is the best first base coach in baseball."

He elected not to coach in the 2020 season, but he returned to the Royals as their first base coach for 2021.

== Early life ==
Kuntz was born on February 4, 1955, in Orange, California. He was born to Chet and Willie Kuntz. His father was a bricklayer who later became an auto mechanic. The family moved from Orange to Wichita, Kansas when Rusty was young, then moved to Paso Robles, California a few years later.

He attended Paso Robles High School in California, where he played baseball, basketball, and football. He said that baseball was his least favorite of the three sports at the time and that he was drawn to basketball because of the game's pace. Nonetheless, following his senior year as an outfielder for the Bearcats, he was selected for All-CIF Second Team honors in 1973.

== College career ==
Continuing his education, Kuntz attended Cuesta College and California State University, Stanislaus. At Cuesta College, Kuntz played center field on the baseball team, quarterbacked the football team and was the center on the basketball team. His six triples during the 1975 CCCAA season remain tied for an all-time single-season Cougars program record.

After hitting for .402 and .442 batting averages in two seasons at Cuesta, Kuntz's father encouraged him to focus on baseball. At CSU Stanislaus, Kuntz played on two teams that went to the Division III World Series. He was later inducted into the university's Warrior Athletics Hall of Fame.

== Minor league baseball ascent ==
Kuntz was drafted by the Chicago White Sox as the first pick in the 11th round of the 1977 Major League Baseball draft.

Kuntz played 51 games for the rookie-level Gulf Coast League White Sox in the 1977 season. He hit for .287 as the team finished first in the Gulf Coast League standings. The next season, Kuntz was promoted to the Class AA team, the Knoxville Sox. He bypassed the Class A affiliate because the Knoxville center fielder was suffering from migraine headaches, and he won the starting center field position. He hit .263 for Knoxville with 10 home runs in 113 games; the team was managed by Tony La Russa for part of the season and won first place in the Southern League. Starting the 1979 season with Chicago's Class AAA affiliate, the Iowa Oaks, Kuntz played 122 games, batted .294 and hit 15 home runs in 394 at bats.

== MLB playing career ==
=== Early career ===
Kuntz stood 6 feet 3 inches (1.91 m) and weighed 190 pounds (86 kg) during his playing career. He batted and threw right-handed. Kuntz made his MLB debut with the White Sox on September 1, 1979. He spent all of the 1980 and 1981 seasons with the White Sox, but he was used sparingly, registering less than 120 plate appearances in the two seasons combined. He started 1982 in the minor leagues with the Edmonton Trappers of the Pacific Coast League, hitting .269 with 7 home runs and 34 RBI in 193 at bats. He walked 50 times in 249 plate appearances for Edmonton. He was called back up to the major league team near the end of that season.

He was traded to the Minnesota Twins in June 1983, with the White Sox receiving minor leaguer Mike Sodders in exchange. He was traded to the Detroit Tigers for pitcher Larry Pashnick after the 1983 season. The Pashnick-Kuntz trade was prompted because future Baseball Hall of Fame outfielder Kirby Puckett was playing in the minor leagues for Minnesota's Class AA affiliate and was expected to quickly join the Twins as an impact player. In 1984 with Detroit, Kuntz had the best numbers of his career: a .286 average and a .393 on-base percentage. He appeared in a career-high 84 major league games that season, mostly as a pinch-hitter and outfielder.

=== 1984 World Series ===
In the fifth and deciding game of the 1984 World Series against the San Diego Padres, Kuntz pinch-hit for designated hitter Johnny Grubb with the bases loaded and the score tied at three. Kuntz hit a pop-up to short right field that Tony Gwynn was unable to see ("I lost it in the sky," he admitted in a radio interview years later). Second baseman Alan Wiggins made the catch, but was unable to prevent Kirk Gibson from racing home from third with the go-ahead run. The Tigers maintained their lead after that, giving Kuntz an unlikely game-winning RBI.

The 1984 American League Championship Series and the ensuing World Series represented Kuntz's only career postseason appearances. In a 2010 Baseball Prospectus article, Steven Goldman wrote that the 1984 Tigers were "a great team that relied on a lot of fluke elements... The club had no regular first baseman, no regular third baseman, and the primary left fielder hit .239/.302/.342 against right-handers. The club made up for this in part by getting terrific production out of role players like Ruppert Jones, Johnny Grubb, and Rusty Kuntz, players who wouldn't synch up again..."

=== Later career ===
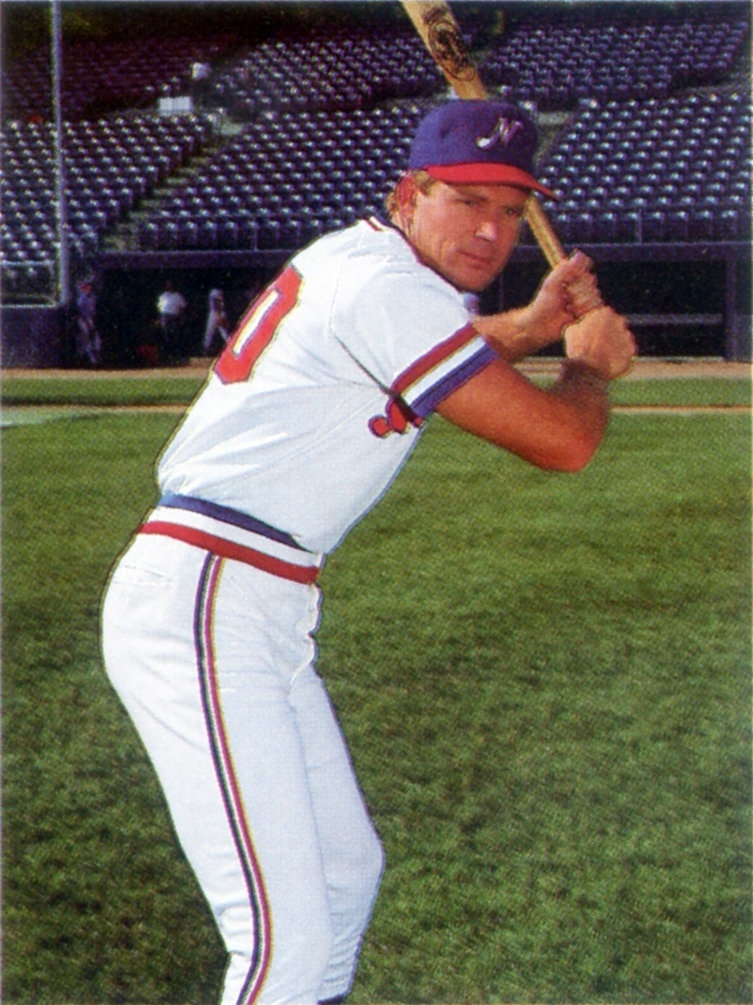
Kuntz with the Nashville Sounds in 1985

Kuntz returned to the Tigers in 1985 but appeared in just five games (last on April 24, 1985) before being sent back to the minor leagues. After batting .222 for Detroit's AAA affiliate, the Nashville Sounds, he was released by the Detroit organization. He signed with the Oakland Athletics a couple of months later, but he did not play any games with them. Kuntz retired as a player with 277 games played, a .236 career batting average, 5 home runs and 38 RBI.

== Post-playing career ==
Kuntz was out of baseball in 1986, working for the United Parcel Service. He worked as a coach in the Houston Astros organization during the 1987 and 1988 seasons, then moved to the Seattle Mariners. With Seattle, he served as a first-base coach between 1989 and 1992. Kuntz joined the Florida Marlins organization in 1993 as a minor league baserunning and outfield coach. He became the team's first-base coach after the 1994 season. In 1997, Kuntz moved into a role as roving instructor with the Marlins organization. In August of that year he worked on defensive skills with Gary Sheffield when the major league slugger was struggling with injuries.

In late 2000, Kuntz decided not to return to his role as first-base coach and outfield instructor. Instead, he went back to his position as a roving instructor with the team, which allowed for more time to be spent with his family. At that time, Marlins players including Cliff Floyd and Mark Kotsay praised Kuntz for the amount of preparation that he put into his coaching. Kotsay gave Kuntz credit for the stolen bases he had accrued. Floyd said, ""I don't know what I'm going to do. I'm telling you, he's meant everything. He tells me about every pitcher we're facing. He keeps me going when I'm down. You don't get that too often in this game. You're expected just to be strong, handle everything. But it ain't that easy sometimes. He's a players' man. He loves us."

Kuntz was dismissed from his position with the Marlins before spring training in 2002. The move was part of a mass firing of Marlins personnel in player development and scouting after the team's change in ownership. Kuntz, who was paid for the 2002 season in any case due to the terms of his contract, kept a job working on the grounds crew at the team's spring training site. He had performed ground crew duties at the site for several years in the offseasons. Late in the 2002 season, the Atlanta Braves hired Kuntz as a roving instructor. After the season, he was hired by the Pittsburgh Pirates as a first-base coach. In October 2005, the Pirates offered minor league positions to Kuntz and fellow coaches Gerald Perry and Alvaro Espinoza. He spent the next two seasons coaching between the Class AAA Indianapolis Indians and the major league club.

After the 2007 season, the Kansas City Royals named him their first-base coach. In October 2009, the team reassigned him, designating him field instructor and special assistant to the team's general manager, Dayton Moore. In August 2012, he was named the Royals' first base coach after the dismissal of Doug Sisson. Sisson had replaced Kuntz as the Royals' first base coach after the 2010 season. At the conclusion of the 2012 season, the Royals announced that they would retain Kuntz for the 2013 season. In a January 2014 article, the Boston Globe listed Kuntz as one of the baserunning/outfield coaches who had the most respect among his peers in the major leagues. "Kuntz's outfielders are fundamentally sound and get great jumps on balls. Kuntz has been able to improve arm accuracy". For the 2018 season, the Royals announced that Kuntz will be moved to another role in the organization and he will not return to his original position as first base coach, being replaced by Mitch Maier. It was announced that he would return to his role as Royals first base coach prior to the 2020 season. Kuntz, however, ultimately opted out of the 2020 season due to COVID-19 concerns and was replaced by Damon Hollins. Kuntz returned to the team the following year.

On November 3, 2021, the Royals announced that Kuntz would be moving from his coaching role to assume a front office role as the general manager of quality control, as well as a special assistant to team president Dayton Moore.

== Personal life ==
Kuntz's son Kevin was drafted by the Royals in the 2009 MLB draft but he chose to play baseball at the University of Kansas. He was selected again by the Royals in the 28th round of the 2013 MLB draft. Kevin spent the 2013 season in the minor leagues at the team's rookie-level affiliate, the Burlington Royals.

The coach has been the subject of sophomoric humor, mainly due to his surname's resemblance to the vulgar word cunt. A 2010 Bleacher Report article said that his name was "hands down the best name ever. So many jokes, so little time." In April 2013, The Big Lead published a post about the name after a photo depicted Kuntz standing to the right of White Sox first baseman Paul Konerko and Royals baserunner Chris Getz. The resulting image seemed to display the phrase "Konerko Getz Kuntz" on the backs of their uniform jerseys. In 2017, a poll by Ranker received more than 13,000 votes and placed Kuntz at No. 1 on its list of "The Best Baseball Names of All Time".
