= Jim Lentine =

American baseball player (born 1954)

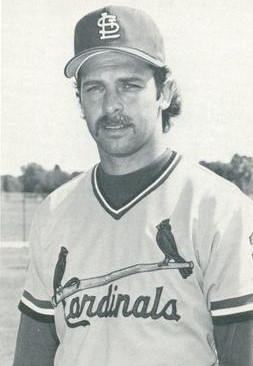
- Outfielder
- Born: July 16, 1954 (age 71); Los Angeles, California, U.S.
- Batted: Right Threw: Right

MLB debut
- September 3, 1978, for the St. Louis Cardinals

Last MLB appearance
- October 5, 1980, for the Detroit Tigers

MLB statistics
- Batting average: .263
- Home runs: 1
- Runs batted in: 20
- Stats at Baseball Reference

Teams
- St. Louis Cardinals (1978–1980); Detroit Tigers (1980)

James Matthew Lentine (born July 16, 1954) is an American former Major League Baseball (MLB) outfielder. He played all or part of three seasons in the major leagues, from 1978 to 1980, for the St. Louis Cardinals and Detroit Tigers. He is based in San Clemente, California, and working as an area scout for the Toronto Blue Jays.
