= Dave Gumpert =

American baseball player (born 1958)

- Pitcher
- Born: May 5, 1958 (age 68); South Haven, Michigan, U.S.
- Batted: Right Threw: Right

MLB debut
- July 25, 1982, for the Detroit Tigers

Last MLB appearance
- May 29, 1987, for the Kansas City Royals

MLB statistics
- Win–loss record: 3–2
- Earned run average: 4.31
- Strikeouts: 76
- Stats at Baseball Reference

Teams
- Detroit Tigers (1982–1983); Chicago Cubs (1985–1986); Kansas City Royals (1987)

David Lawrence Gumpert (born May 5, 1958) is an American former professional baseball player who attended Aquinas College in Grand Rapids, Michigan before pitching in the Major Leagues from 1982–1987 for the Chicago Cubs, Detroit Tigers, and Kansas City Royals. Gumpert was named Rookie of the Year for the Detroit Tigers in 1983.

He was born in South Haven, Michigan.

After his MLB career, Gumpert coached Bloomingdale High School's varsity baseball team before taking the position of athletic director at South Haven High School in South Haven, Michigan. Gumpert coached Bloomingdale's varsity team to a District Championship in 1996, and was inducted into Aquinas College Athletic Hall of Fame as well as South Haven High School's Hall of Fame.

Gumpert currently resides in South Haven, Michigan. He is retired, but remains active in his community, most recently assisting the South Haven Varsity Girls' softball team to district and regional titles (2018).
