= Jerry Ujdur =

American baseball player (born 1957)

- Pitcher
- Born: March 5, 1957 (age 69); Hermantown, Minnesota, U.S.
- Batted: Right Threw: Right

MLB debut
- August 17, 1980, for the Detroit Tigers

Last MLB appearance
- September 28, 1984, for the Cleveland Indians

MLB statistics
- Win–loss record: 12–16
- Earned run average: 4.78
- Strikeouts: 118
- Stats at Baseball Reference

Teams
- Detroit Tigers (1980–1983); Cleveland Indians (1984)

Gerald Raymond Ujdur (born March 5, 1957) is an American former Major League Baseball pitcher. Ujdur pitched in all or part of five seasons from 1980 through 1984.

Ujdur played college baseball for the Minnesota Golden Gophers. He was selected by the Detroit Tigers in the fourth round of the 1978 Major League Baseball draft, and began his career with the Lakeland Tigers that year, finishing with a 5-2 win-loss record and a 2.39 earned run average (ERA). After pitching in 19 games for the Montgomery Rebels in 1979, he started the 1980 season with the Evansville Triplets. He went 9-4 with a 3.37 ERA before he was promoted to the main Tigers roster.

Ujdur was called up to the majors on August 17, 1980 to replace injured pitcher Roger Weaver. He made his debut that day and finished the season with a win and a 7.59 ERA in nine games. In 1981, he pitched in four games for the Tigers, but spent most of the year with Evansville, where he had a 7-10 record and a 4.09 ERA in 25 starts. Ujdur spent 1982 as a starter for the Tigers for most of the season. That year, he had a 10-10 record and a 3.69 ERA and finished second in the American League in hits per nine innings with 7.58. He was also named Tigers' rookie pitcher of the year. After a couple of poor starts to begin 1983, the Tigers placed him back in the minors. The following year after spring training, the Tigers released him, and he was picked up by the Indians; he was nearly not able to join a team due to how late in spring the Tigers cut him.

He began the 1984 season with the Maine Guides and spent most of the season there, going 14-8 with a 3.69 ERA, which led to the Indians calling him up in September. With the Indians, he had a 1-2 record and a 6.91 ERA in four games. He was released by the Indians in March 1985, and retired from the game afterwards.
