= Howard Bailey (baseball) =

American baseball player (born 1957)

- Pitcher
- Born: July 31, 1957 (age 68); Grand Haven, Michigan, U.S.
- Batted: Right Threw: Left

MLB debut
- April 12, 1981, for the Detroit Tigers

Last MLB appearance
- October 1, 1983, for the Detroit Tigers

MLB statistics
- Win–loss record: 6–9
- Earned run average: 5.23
- Strikeouts: 41
- Stats at Baseball Reference

Teams
- Detroit Tigers (1981–1983)

Howard Lee Bailey (born July 31, 1957) is an American former Major League Baseball (MLB) pitcher who played for three seasons. He was signed by the Detroit Tigers as an amateur free agent in 1978 after playing his college ball at Grand Valley State University. He played for the Tigers from 1981 to 1983, playing in 50 career games. One highlight of Bailey's career occurred on October 1, 1982. In the second game of a doubleheader, Bailey picked up his one and only MLB save. He pitched three shutout innings to hold down a 4-2 Tigers victory over the Indians, saving the game for starting pitcher Pat Underwood.
