= Milt Wilcox =

American baseball player (born 1950)

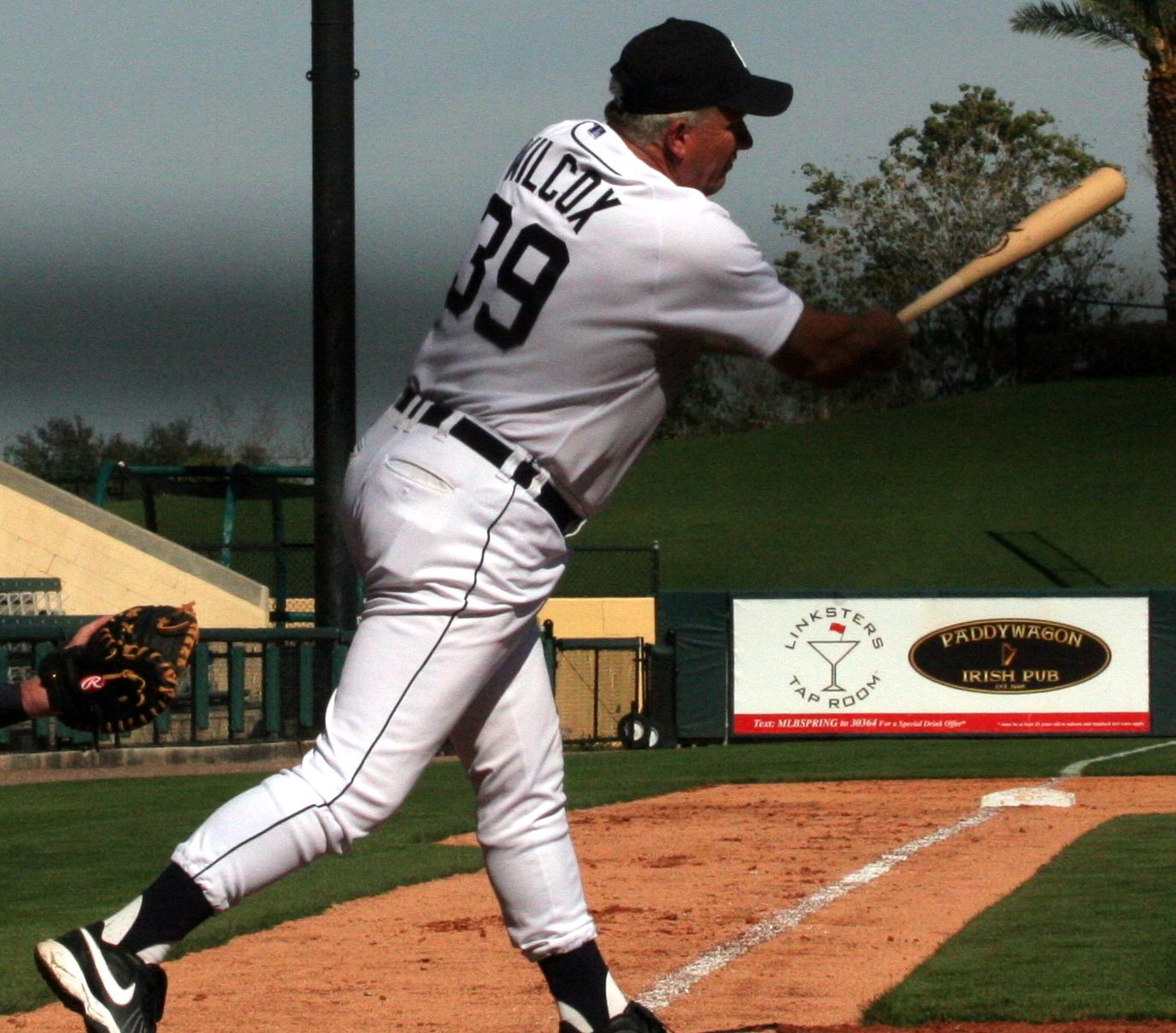
- Wilcox at Detroit Tigers fantasy camp in 2012
- Pitcher
- Born: April 20, 1950 (age 76); Honolulu, Hawaii, U.S.
- Batted: Right Threw: Right

MLB debut
- September 5, 1970, for the Cincinnati Reds

Last MLB appearance
- June 12, 1986, for the Seattle Mariners

MLB statistics
- Win–loss record: 119–113
- Earned run average: 4.07
- Strikeouts: 1,137
- Stats at Baseball Reference

Teams
- Cincinnati Reds (1970–1971); Cleveland Indians (1972–1974); Chicago Cubs (1975); Detroit Tigers (1977–1985); Seattle Mariners (1986)

Career highlights and awards
- World Series champion (1984)

Milton Edward Wilcox (born April 20, 1950) is an American former baseball pitcher. He pitched for 16 years in Major League Baseball for the Cincinnati Reds (1970–1971), Cleveland Indians (1972–1974), Chicago Cubs (1975), Detroit Tigers (1977–1985), and Seattle Mariners (1986).

In his first major-league season, he won Game 3 of the 1970 National League Championship Series and lost Game 2 of the 1970 World Series. Fourteen years later, he won 17 games for the 1984 Detroit Tigers team, pitched a shutout in the final game of the 1984 American League Championship Series, and was the winning pitcher in Game 3 of the 1984 World Series.

In 16 major-league seasons Wilcox appeared in 394 games, including 283 as a starter, and compiled a 119–113 win–loss record with a 4.07 earned run average (ERA) and 1,137 strikeouts, 2,016 2/3 innings pitched, and 770 bases on balls.

== Early years ==
Wilcox was born in 1950 at Pearl Harbor in Honolulu where his father was a drafting engineer. When Wilcox was three years old, he moved with his family to Crooked Oak, Oklahoma. He attended Crooked Oak High School where he was a star for the baseball and basketball teams.

== Professional baseball ==
=== Cincinnati Reds ===
Wilcox graduated from high school in June 1968 and had a scholarship offer from the University of Oklahoma. He was selected that same month by the Cincinnati Reds in the second round (33rd overall pick) of the 1968 Major League Baseball draft. The Reds offered him a $20,000 signing bonus, and he chose the Reds over the University of Oklahoma.

In 1968, Wilcox's first year of professional baseball, he played for the rookie-level Tampa Tarpons of the Florida State League and the Class A Gulf Coast League Reds. He appeared in 14 games, all as a starter, and compiled a 6–5 record with a 1.24 earned run average (ERA).

Wilcox next split the 1969 season between the Florida Instructional League Reds and the Tampa Tarpons. In 1970, he was promoted to the Triple-A Indianapolis Indians of the American Association. He appeared in 28 games for Indianapolis and compiled a 12–10 record with a career-high 110 strikeouts. He led the American Association in 1970 with five shutouts, and his 2.84 ERA was second best in the league. He also pitched a no-hitter against Evansville.

After a strong season with Indianapolis, Wilcox was called up by the Reds in September 1970. He made his major-league debut on September 5, pitching five innings and getting the win against the San Diego Padres. He appeared in five games for Sparky Anderson’s Reds in 1970, compiling a 3–1 record with a 2.42 ERA and 13 strikeouts. He qualified for the Reds' postseason roster and was the winning pitcher (three scoreless innings) in Game 3 of the 1970 National League Championship Series. He was also the losing pitcher in Game 2 of the 1970 World Series where he gave up two earned runs in two innings pitched.

Wilcox began the 1971 season with the Reds, compiling a 2–2 record with a 3.32 ERA. He was then optioned to Indianapolis where he compiled an 8–5 record with a 2.21 ERA and 62 strikeouts.

=== Cleveland Indians ===
On December 6, 1971, the Reds traded Wilcox to the Cleveland Indians in exchange for outfielder Ted Uhlaender.

Wilcox became part of the Indians' starting rotation in 1972. He began the season strong, compiling an early record of 4–2 with a 0.92 ERA. On May 27, 1972, he appeared on the cover of The Sporting News. He was then sidelined with strep throat and tried to come back too early. He tore a muscle in his pitching arm and later developed tendinitis in his elbow. The injuries began a four-year slide in Wilcox's career. He finished the 1972 season with a 7–14 record, a 3.40 ERA, and 90 strikeouts.

In 1973, Wilcox's ERA soared to a career-high 5.83. He appeared in 26 games, 19 as a starter, and compiled an 8–10 record with 82 strikeouts. In 1974, he started only two games, while appearing in 39 games as a relief pitcher. He compiled a 2–2 record with a 4.67 ERA and 33 strikeouts in 71–1/3 inning pitched.

On May 29, 1974, during a game in Arlington between the Texas Rangers and the Cleveland Indians, in the bottom of the eighth inning, Lenny Randle bunted off Wilcox, one pitch after Wilcox had thrown a pitch that flew behind Randle's back. But as Wilcox tried to scramble for the ball, Randle changed course and deliberately smashed into Wilcox. As Randle continued to first base, he was tackled by other Cleveland players and ruled out. A bench-clearing brawl ensued. This incident preceded the 10 Cent Beer Night riot in Cleveland six days later on June 4.

=== Chicago Cubs ===
On February 25, 1975, the Indians traded Wilcox to the Chicago Cubs in exchange for outfielder Brock Davis and pitcher Dave LaRoche. Wilcox appeared in 25 games for the Cubs in 1975, all as a relief pitcher. He compiled a 0–1 record with 21 strikeouts and a 5.63 ERA. The Cubs sent Wilcox to the Wichita Aeros of the American Association for the latter part of the 1975 season and the first part of the 1976 season.

=== Detroit Tigers ===
==== Bowling therapy ====
The Detroit Tigers purchased Wilcox from the Cubs on June 10, 1976. When the Tigers expressed interest in Wilcox, the Cubs reportedly "were glad to let him go." He spent the remainder of the 1976 season with the Evansville Triplets, the Tigers’ Triple-A club in the American Association.

After years of pitching in pain, Wilcox's arm recovered in 1977. Wilcox credited "throwing bowling balls with rescuing his major league pitching career." His doctor told him that bowling might help his sore arm, so he joined a bowling league in 1976. Wilcox noted: "At first my arm was tired after I bowled, but after a while it felt stronger." He later recalled: "By Christmas time I could feel the arm getting stronger. And then I was okay the next season."

Wilcox spent the first part of the 1977 season in Evansville, compiling a 9–4 record in 14 starts with a 2.44 ERA and 69 strikeout. He was called up to the Tigers in June 1977 and appeared in his first major-league game in two years. During the 1977 season, he appeared in 20 games for the Tigers, 13 of them as a starter, and compiled a 6–2 record with a 3.64 ERA.

==== 1978 to 1982 ====
From 1978 to 1982, Wilcox was a regular member of the Tigers' starting rotation. In each of those five years, he started between 24 and 33 games and won 12 or 13 games per year. He compiled a 62–52 record with a 3.88 ERA.

Wilcox had a scare in 1980 when George Brett, after being brushed back by two inside pitches from Wilcox, charged the mound and landed on top of Wilcox. The collision reinjured Wilcox's shoulder and impaired his performance in the latter part of the season.

Wilcox was also the Tigers' union representative during these years, including during the 1981 Major League Baseball strike.

On April 20, 1982, on his 32nd birthday, Wilcox threw a one-hit victory against the Kansas City Royals. He struck out George Brett twice and said after the game, "I felt I could throw the ball through a wall."

Wilcox won 31 games for the Tigers during the 1970s, ranking him fourth on the club, behind Mickey Lolich, Joe Coleman, and John Hiller. He also ranked third in winning percentage (.564) for the 1970s.

==== Almost perfect ====
On April 15, 1983, Wilcox came within one out of a perfect game. He took out the first two Chicago White Sox batters (Carlton Fisk and Mike Squires) in the ninth inning, but with two outs in the ninth, pinch-hitter Jerry Hairston, Sr. hit a single to center field on the first pitch. Wilcox had eight strikeouts in the game, and the White Sox hit only four balls beyond the infield. The fans in Chicago gave Wilcox a standing ovation at the start of the ninth inning and booed when Hairston got the hit.

During the full 1983 season, Wilcox started 26 games and compiled an 11–10 record with a 3.97 ERA and 101 strikeouts. Wilcox became a free agent after the 1983 season, but the Tigers signed him in late December to a two-year contract through the end of the 1985 season.

==== 17 wins and World Series ====
In 1984, the Tigers started the season with a 35–5 record. Wilcox set a team record by starting the season with a 6–0 record. He finished the season with career highs in wins (17) and strikeouts (132). He lost only eight games for a .680 winning percentage with a 4.00 ERA. Catcher Lance Parrish attributed Wilcox's 1984 surge to confidence:

I've been trying to figure out all season why Milt's been so much better this year. I think what happened is that early in the year we got him some big leads and then played good defense behind him. As the season wore on he became more and more confident.

In the postseason, the Tigers swept the Kansas City Royals in the American League Championship Series. On October 5, Wilcox won the decisive Game 3, striking out eight batters in eight innings of shutout baseball. As he was being soaked with champagne after the game, Wilcox said: "This is something I waited for my whole career. It has to be the best game I've ever pitched." On October 12, Wilcox was also the winning pitcher in Game 3 of the 1984 World Series.

==== Shoulder injury and release ====
Wilcox had shoulder surgery after the 1984 season. He missed most of the 1985 season with ongoing shoulder problems and tendinitis. He appeared in only eight games and compiled a 1–3 record with a 4.85 ERA. In December 1985, Detroit general manager Bill Lajoie announced: "We're not going to tend him a contract. We're not going to invite him to spring training. Milt's career with the Tigers is over."

=== Seattle Mariners ===
During the winter after the 1985 season, Wilcox pitched in the Dominican Republic and compiled a 6–2 record in 90 innings. On February 5, 1986, he signed as a free agent with the Seattle Mariners. Wilcox insisted at the time that he was "completely healed" and in better shape than he had ever been. Wilcox appeared in 13 games for the Mariners and compiled a 0–8 record with a 5.50 ERA. When asked to be a relief pitcher, Wilcox declined, saying he was not suited or ready mentally to be a relief pitcher. He was released by the Mariners on June 14, 1986.

== Family and later years ==
In September 1969, Wilcox married Lajuanda Faye Erwin. He has been married and divorced twice. He has a daughter, Stacy, and a son, Brian.

After his baseball career ended, Wilcox held various sales jobs. As of 1992, he was the vice president of sales for Reno Machinery & Engineering Co. in Warren, Michigan.

In 2003, he served as a broadcaster for the West Michigan Whitecaps. He also bred chinchillas and operated an aquatic dog jumping attraction called Ultimate Air Dogs.
