= Lynn Jones =

American baseball player and coach (born 1953)

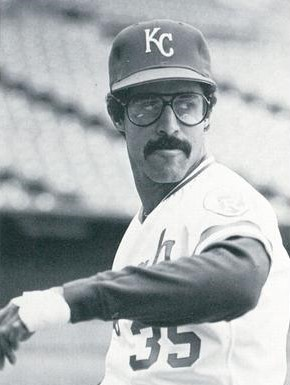
- Jones with the Kansas City Royals in 1984
- Outfielder
- Born: January 1, 1953 (age 73); Meadville, Pennsylvania, U.S.
- Batted: Right Threw: Right

MLB debut
- April 13, 1979, for the Detroit Tigers

Last MLB appearance
- October 4, 1986, for the Kansas City Royals

MLB statistics
- Batting average: .252
- Home runs: 7
- Runs batted in: 91
- Stats at Baseball Reference

Teams
- As player: Detroit Tigers (1979–1983); Kansas City Royals (1984–1986); As coach: Kansas City Royals (1991–1992); Florida Marlins (2001); Boston Red Sox (2004–2005)

Career highlights and awards
- 2× World Series champion (1985, 2004)

Lynn Morris Jones (born January 1, 1953) is an American former professional baseball player, coach, and manager. He played as an outfielder in Major League Baseball (MLB) for the Detroit Tigers and Kansas City Royals. He later was a coach for the Royals, Florida Marlins, and Boston Red Sox, and served as a manager in the minor leagues.

== Biography ==
Jones attended Thiel College, in western Pennsylvania, where he played for the Tomcats, setting the school's single-season batting record, hitting .440 in 1974. A three-sport athlete, Jones also played basketball and soccer in college. In 1987, he was inducted into the college's athletic Hall of Fame. He joined the Theta Phi chapter of Alpha Chi Rho fraternity while at Thiel.

=== Playing career ===
Jones was originally drafted by the Cincinnati Reds in the 10th round of the 1974 June draft before being chosen by the Detroit Tigers in the 1978 Rule 5 draft.

Named Detroit's Rookie of the Year in 1979, Jones also played in 14 career post-season games with the Kansas City Royals (1984–1985), going 2-for-3 with a double and a triple in six games in the 1985 World Series against St. Louis.

Over eight-major league seasons, Jones batted .252 with seven home runs and 91 RBI in 527 games.

=== Post-playing career ===
Following his retirement as a player, Jones managed in the minor leagues for the Florida Marlins and Atlanta Braves organizations. In nine seasons as a minor-league manager, Jones compiled a 555–630 (.468) record and reached the postseason twice, in 1995 and 1997 with Kane County of the Midwest League.

Jones was first base coach in the major leagues for the Royals in 1991 and 1992. He also coached (initially first base, then third base) for the Marlins in 2001, when he also instructed the club's outfielders and baserunners. During 2004 and 2005, Jones coached first base for the Boston Red Sox. He missed part of the 2004 season after sustaining a non-baseball eye injury. The 2004 Red Sox won the World Series, Jones' second championship team.

After working as the minor-league baserunning coordinator for the Braves, Jones joined the coaching staff of his alma mater, Thiel College, in 2013.

| Preceded by Bob Schaefer | Kansas City Royals first base coach 1991–1992 | Succeeded by Lee May |
| Preceded by Rusty Kuntz | Florida Marlins first base coach 2001; April 2–May 28 | Succeeded by Tony Taylor |
| Preceded by Fredi González | Florida Marlins third base coach 2001; May 29–October 7 | Succeeded by Ozzie Guillén |
| Preceded by Jon Deeble | Lowell Spinners manager 2003 | Succeeded by Luis Alicea |
| Preceded by Dallas Williams | Boston Red Sox first base coach 2004–2005 | Succeeded by Bill Haselman |
