= Larry Pashnick =

American baseball player (born 1956)

- Pitcher
- Born: April 25, 1956 (age 70); Lincoln Park, Michigan, U.S.
- Batted: Right Threw: Right

MLB debut
- April 10, 1982, for the Detroit Tigers

Last MLB appearance
- June 19, 1984, for the Minnesota Twins

MLB statistics
- Win–loss record: 7–8
- Earned run average: 4.17
- Strikeouts: 46
- Stats at Baseball Reference

Teams
- Detroit Tigers (1982–1983); Minnesota Twins (1984)

Larry John Pashnick (born April 25, 1956) is an American former baseball pitcher. Pashnick, a right-hander, played three seasons in Major League Baseball (MLB) from 1982 to 1984, posting a career won–loss record of 7–8 and a 4.17 earned run average (ERA).

After attending Michigan State University, Pashnick signed with the Detroit Tigers in 1979 as an amateur free agent and made his MLB debut with the Tigers in 1982. That year, he went 4–4 in 28 appearances, including 13 starts, and had a 4.01 ERA. In 1983, Pashnick compiled a 1–3 record in 12 games, including six starts, and his ERA jumped to 5.26. During the 1983 off-season, the Tigers traded him to the Minnesota Twins for outfielder Rusty Kuntz. Pitching primarily as a reliever in Minnesota, Pashnick had a 2–1 record and a 3.52 ERA in 1984, his last season in MLB.
