= Lou Whitaker =

American baseball player (born 1957)

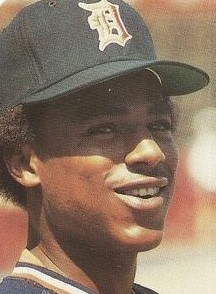
- Whitaker with the Detroit Tigers in 1987
- Second baseman
- Born: May 12, 1957 (age 69); Brooklyn, New York, U.S.
- Batted: Left Threw: Right

MLB debut
- September 9, 1977, for the Detroit Tigers

Last MLB appearance
- October 1, 1995, for the Detroit Tigers

MLB statistics
- Batting average: .276
- Hits: 2,369
- Home runs: 244
- Runs batted in: 1,084
- Stats at Baseball Reference

Teams
- Detroit Tigers (1977–1995)

Career highlights and awards
- 5× All-Star (1983–1987); World Series champion (1984); AL Rookie of the Year (1978); 3× Gold Glove Award (1983–1985); 4× Silver Slugger Award (1983–1985, 1987); Detroit Tigers No. 1 retired

Louis Rodman Whitaker Jr. (born May 12, 1957), nicknamed "Sweet Lou", is an American former professional baseball second baseman. Whitaker spent his entire career with the Detroit Tigers. From 1977 to 1995, he appeared in 2,390 games for the Tigers, third most in franchise history behind Ty Cobb and Al Kaline. He helped the Tigers win the 1984 World Series, was selected as an American League All-Star five consecutive years (1983–1987) and won four Silver Slugger Awards (1983–1985, 1987) and three Gold Glove Awards (1983–1985). The Tigers retired his No. 1 jersey in August 2022.

Born in Brooklyn and raised in Virginia, Whitaker was drafted by the Detroit Tigers in 1975. He spent three years in the minor leagues and was selected in 1976 as the most valuable player in the Florida State League. He made his Major League Baseball debut in September 1977 and won the American League Rookie of the Year Award in 1978. Whitaker won the Tiger of the Year award in 1983 after hitting .320 and tallying 206 hits. He repeated as Tiger of the Year in 1989 when he hit a career-high 28 home runs.

Whitaker and shortstop Alan Trammell played beside each other for 19 seasons and are the longest-running double play combination in major-league history. Whitaker was inducted into the Michigan Sports Hall of Fame in 2000.

== Early life ==
Whitaker was born in Brooklyn, New York City, in 1957. In the late 1950s, his mother, Marion Arlene Williams, moved to Martinsville, Virginia. Whitaker was raised in Martinsville by his mother and grandmother. Asked in 1979 about his father, Whitaker said, "He's never done anything for me. I don't hate him. I haven't got time to hate anybody. I just don't care to meet him. There's nothing emotionally happening between us."

Whitaker attended Martinsville High School. He played for the school's baseball team as a middle infielder and pitcher. Whitaker graduated in 1975 and committed to play college baseball for Ferrum College.

== Professional baseball player ==
=== Minor leagues ===
The Detroit Tigers selected Whitaker in the fifth round, with the 99th overall selection, of the 1975 Major League Baseball draft. He signed with the Tigers rather than attend college. He made his professional debut in 1975 for the Bristol Tigers of the Rookie-level Appalachian League.

Whitaker was the starting third baseman in 1976 for the Lakeland Tigers of the Class A Florida State League. Whitaker batted .297, had 48 stolen bases, and 62 runs batted in, and was named the league's most valuable player. In one game with Lakeland, he stole five bases, including three steals of home. Because of his "sweet swing" with the bat, Whitaker was given the nickname "Sweet Lou" while playing for Lakeland. Lakeland manager Jim Leyland said at the time: "For a youngster he's got a lot of poise and self-assurance. He's confident of his ability to play and nothing seems to bother him."

After the 1976 season, the Tigers sent Whitaker to instructional camp to convert him into a second baseman. Whitaker said at the time: "Detroit needs a second baseman. And even though I've never played that position I'm ready to try. I've got Eddie Brinkman teaching me and he's good. I hope that I can do as well." Brinkman later recalled, "Whitaker is such a natural athlete that he took to second base right away."

During winter ball before the 1977 season, the Tigers also paired Whitaker with shortstop Alan Trammell. In 1977, they both played for the Montgomery Rebels of the Double-A Southern League. Whitaker and Trammell were both named to the Southern League all-star team. Whitaker compiled a .280 batting average with 38 stolen bases, 58 bases on balls, and a .374 on-base percentage.

=== Rookie of the Year ===
In September 1977, the Tigers called up Whitaker and Trammell. Both made their major league debuts on September 9 against the Boston Red Sox. Whitaker went three-for-five with a stolen base, hit a double off the Green Monster at Fenway Park, and registered his first run batted in (RBI) against the Baltimore Orioles. He appeared in 11 games at the end of the 1977 season, compiling a .250 batting average and .333 on-base percentage.

In 1978, manager Ralph Houk started the season with Whitaker and Trammell platooning with Steve Dillard and Mark Wagner. By May, Whitaker and Trammell had established themselves as every day starters. Houk noted at the time, "Those two kids have just been great. They have played absolutely outstanding defensive ball. You saw Whitaker make a play very few second basemen in the league would have made." By August, Houk was effusive in his praise: "They're the best I've ever seen for their age. On the double plays, knowing where the ball is going to be, that's something you can't teach."

In his first full season, Whitaker appeared in 139 games, 123 of them as the Tigers' starting second baseman. He turned 95 double plays, scored 71 runs, stole 20 bases, and compiled a .285 batting average with a .361 on-base percentage. Detroit fans also began a long tradition in 1978, chanting, "Loooooooou" when Whitaker came to the plate. Whitaker recalled that he initially thought the crowd was booing him.

In November 1978, he was voted by the baseball writers as the winner of the American League Rookie of the Year Award. Whitaker received 21 of the 28 first-place votes, easily defeating Paul Molitor (three votes), Carney Lansford (two votes), Trammell (one vote), and Rich Gale (one vote). At the time, Whitaker said, "This is the biggest moment of my career. Winning the award makes me proud of myself for the things I have done."

=== 1979 to 1982 ===
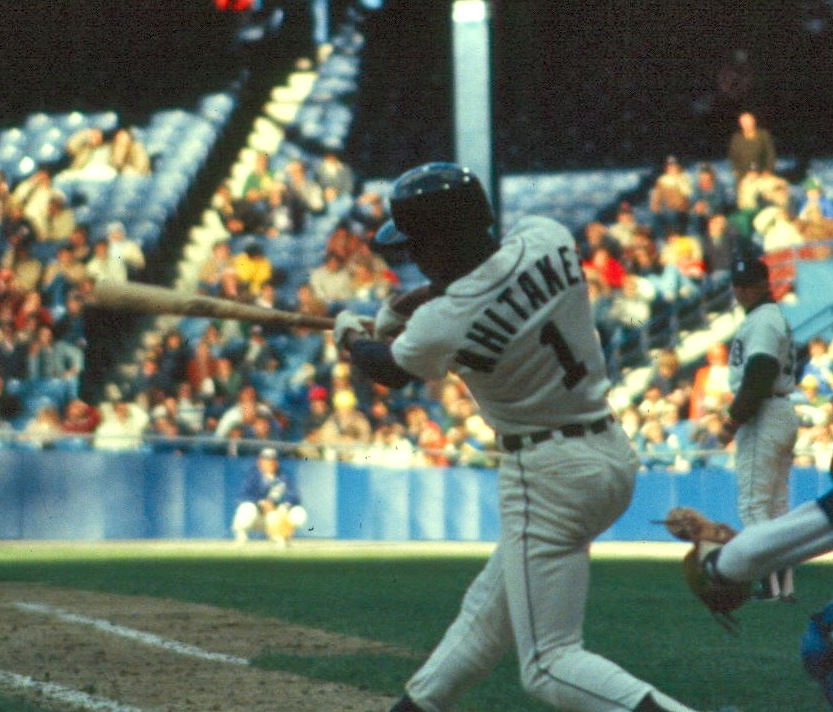
Whitaker bats at Tiger Stadium in 1981

Whitaker had another strong season in 1979. He compiled a .286 batting average, drew 78 bases on balls (boosting his on-base percentage to .395), and stole 20 bases.

In 1980, Whitaker slumped at the plate, his batting average dropping 53 points from the previous season to .233.

In the strike-shortened 1981 season, Whitaker led the American League with 109 games played. His 354 assists led the league's second basemen and ranked third among all players in the league.

After hitting no more than five home runs in any of his previous seasons, Whitaker began to hit for power in 1982, tallying 15 home runs, eight triples, and a .286 batting average. He also had one of his best defensive seasons in 1982, leading the league's second basemen with 470 assists, 120 double plays turned, and a .988 fielding percentage. His 1.9 defensive wins above replacement (dWAR) rating ranked fourth highest in the American League among players at all positions.

=== All-Star in 1983 ===
Whitaker enjoyed perhaps his finest overall season in 1983. He appeared in a career-high 161 games and compiled a .320 batting average and 206 hits, both of which were career highs and ranked third highest in the American League. He also had 40 doubles, six triples, 12 home runs, 72 runs batted in (RBI), 94 runs scored, and a .380 on-base percentage. His 1983 wins above replacement (WAR) rating of 6.7 was the sixth best in the American League.

He was selected for the first of five times to the American League All-Star team. He was selected as a reserve and entered the game as a pinch-hitter in the seventh inning. He hit a triple that landed at the base of the 401-foot marker in Chicago's Comiskey Park and collected a run batted in as Ron Kittle scored on the play. At the end of the 1983 season, Whitaker won the following awards:

- On October 18, The Sporing News selected Whitaker as the second baseman on its annual post-season all-star team.
- On October 28, the Detroit chapter of the Baseball Writers' Association of America selected Whitaker for its "Tiger of the Year" award. Whitaker received 29 of 44 first-place votes, well ahead of Jack Morris who received seven first-place votes.
- On November 16, Whitaker was selected by The Sporting News for the American League Silver Slugger Award, as the best offensive player at second base.
- On December 6, Whitaker was selected as the Gold Glove Award winner as the best defensive second baseman in the American League. It was the first time in the history of the award that three players from a single team won Gold Gloves, as Alan Trammell and Lance Parrish also won the award at their positions.

Whitaker also finished eighth in the voting for the 1983 American League Most Valuable Player Award.

=== World champion in 1984 ===
In 1984, the Tigers opened the season with a 35–5 record and went on to defeat the Kansas City Royals in the 1984 American League Championship Series and the San Diego Padres in the 1984 World Series. Whitaker was the team's leadoff hitter and starting second baseman. He appeared in 142 games at second base and compiled a .289 batting average and 13 home runs. For the second consecutive year, he was selected as an American League All-Star and won Gold Glove and Silver Slugger Awards.

Whitaker hit a double and scored in the first inning of Game 1 of the World Series. He hit .278 in the Series with a .409 on-base percentage, scoring six runs in the five games.

Whitaker's second daughter, Sarah, was born on October 14, 1984, the same day Detroit won the fifth and final game of the World Series.

=== Power surge in 1985 ===
In 1985, Whitaker set a record for Detroit second basemen with 21 home runs, while topping 100 runs scored for the first time in his career (102).

Whitaker was selected to play in the All-Star game for the third consecutive year, but forgot to pack his uniform. Making the discovery just before the game, he had to make do with replica merchandise available for purchase at the park. He obtained an adjustable mesh hat and a blank jersey. He finished off his outfit by scrawling his number on the back in magic marker (or, by some accounts, having a fan do so for him). The Smithsonian requested the jersey and it remains a part of their collection.

=== 1986 to 1992 ===
In 1986, Whitaker hit another 20 homers and was part of a Tigers infield in which all four members (Whitaker, Darrell Evans, Alan Trammell and Darnell Coles) hit at least 20 home runs. During the 1986 All-Star Game, he was one of the five players struck out consecutively by National League pitcher Fernando Valenzuela, tying Carl Hubbell's mark. Whitaker earlier hit a two-run homer in the game, which the American League won 3–2.

In 1987, Whitaker scored a career-high 110 runs and won his final Silver Slugger award at second base as the Tigers edged out the Toronto Blue Jays on the final day of the regular season to win the AL East Division title.

Whitaker reached career highs with 28 homers and 85 RBI in 1989, one of four times he reached the 20-HR plateau, upping his record for the most homers in a season by a Tiger second baseman. Whitaker now shares the season record with Ian Kinsler, who hit 28 homers in 2016 as the Tigers regular second baseman.

Although 1990 saw Whitaker post his lowest batting average in ten years (.237), he didn't let it affect his defense. On the season, Whitaker handled 664 chances and committed only 6 errors, for a career-best .991 fielding percentage. His 1990 range factor was 5.71, well above the league average of 5.23.

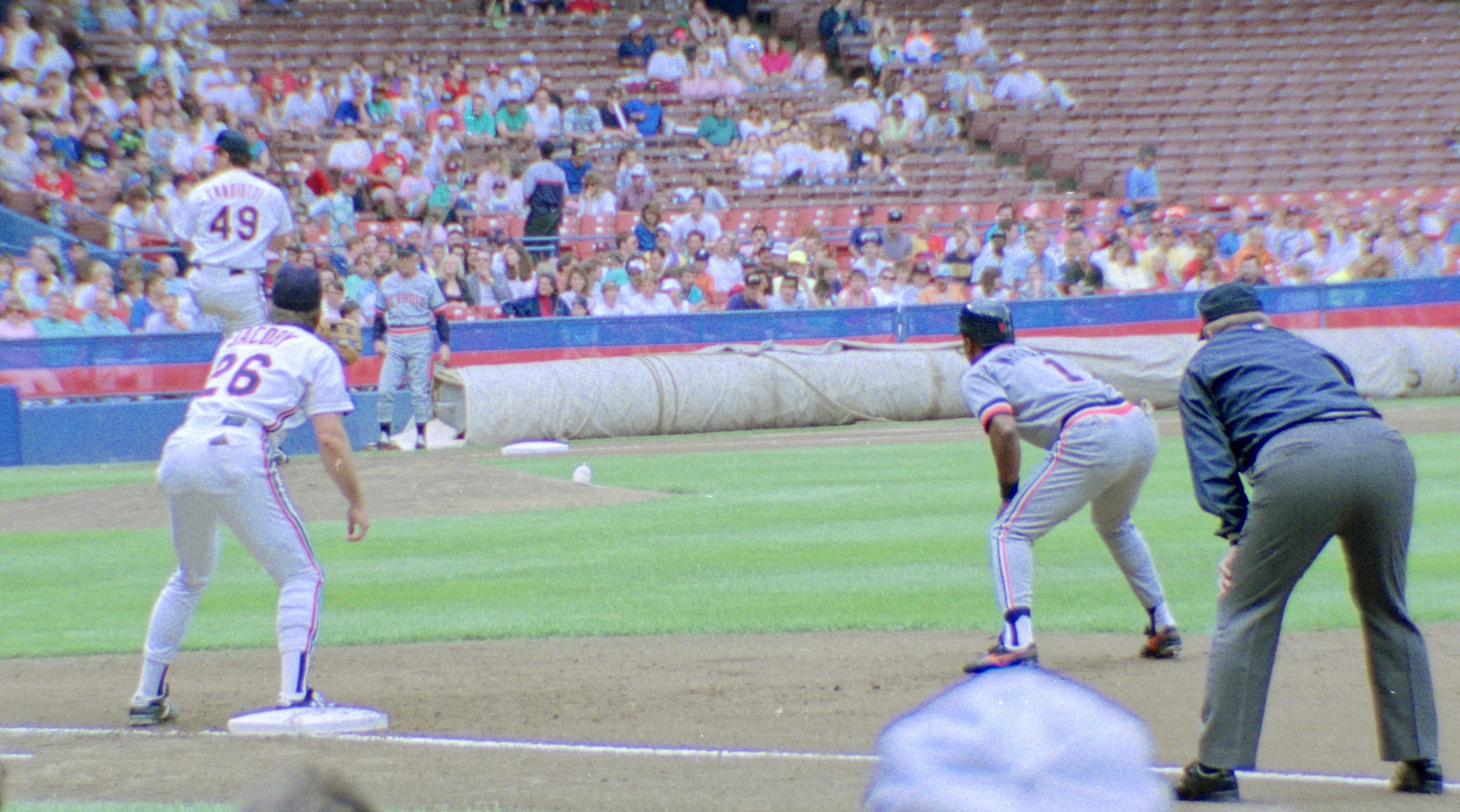
Whitaker takes a lead off first base during a 1991 game at Cleveland Stadium

In 1991, Whitaker's 23 home runs and career-high 90 walks helped him to an .881 OPS, the highest of his career to that point. Whitaker reached three career milestones in 1992, recording his 2,000th game, 2,000th hit, and his 200th home run.

=== Final seasons: 1993 to 1995 ===
In December 1992, after being recruited to join the Atlanta Braves, Whitaker and the Tigers agreed to a three-year, $10-million contract. Whitaker finished his career with three seasons of strong offensive production. In 1993, Whitaker appeared in 119 games, 110 of them at second base. He posted a .290 batting average and a career-best .412 on-base percentage and tallied 67 RBIs. In 1994, he appeared in 92 games, 83 of them at second base. He compiled a .301 batting average, his first .300 season since 1983.

In May 1995, on his 38th birthday, and after missing the first 14 games of the season with a sore shoulder, Whitaker announced his intention to retire at the end of the season. He said at the time: "I'm tired of being sore. . . . I'll be playing softball next year." In his final season, he appeared in 84 games, including 65 games at second base and eight as a designated hitter. He compiled a .293 batting average with 14 doubles, 14 home runs, and career-high .890 on-base plus slugging.

Whitaker played his final game on October 1, 1995, at Camden Yards in Baltimore. When Whitaker and Trammell took the field in the bottom of the first inning, the Orioles' double-play combination of Cal Ripken Jr. and Jeff Huson presented Trammell and Whitaker with bases which they held above their heads as the Baltimore crowd cheered.

=== Whitaker and Trammell ===
Whitaker and Alan Trammell played beside each other at second base and shortstop for 1,918 games over 19-major league seasons, making them the longest running double play combination in major-league history. They started playing together in an instructional league between the 1976 and 1977 seasons. They made their major-league debuts together on September 9, 1977. For the next 19 years, they formed the Tigers' keystone combination. They became associated with each other on and off the field. In December 1983, they made cameo appearances as themselves on the television show Magnum, P.I., starring Tom Selleck. Selleck's character was a Tigers fan, as is Selleck himself. During the 1984 World Series, Trammell described his partnership with Whitaker:

Lou is my partner. We've got more than just a relationship. Our names are linked together now. It's like a marriage. We've become a couple. When people say, 'Trammell,' they say 'and Whitaker,' When they say 'Whitaker,' they say, 'and Trammell.' If they ever break us up, its going to be a very weird day. It'd be like getting divorced."

When Trammell was inducted in 2018 into the Baseball Hall of Fame, he said: "For 19 years, Lou Whitaker and I formed the longest running double play combination in the history of baseball. I doubt that record will ever be broken. Lou, it was an honor and a pleasure to have played alongside you for all those years, and my hope is someday you'll be up here as well."

=== Career statistics ===
Whitaker was an effective leadoff man, adept at drawing walks (averaging 81 per 162 games), quick on the bases, and able to drive the ball with power to all fields. In his 19-year career, Whitaker batted .276 with a .363 on-base percentage, 244 home runs, 1,084 RBI, 1,386 runs, 2,369 hits, 420 doubles, 65 triples, and 143 stolen bases in 2,390 games. Defensively, he recorded a .984 fielding percentage. His career wins above replacement (WAR) of 75.1 ranks 51st all-time among position players, and is higher than all but six second basemen (all six of whom are in the Baseball Hall of Fame). Whitaker is also one of only 19 players ever to hit a ball over the roof of Tiger Stadium.

== Baseball legacy and honors ==
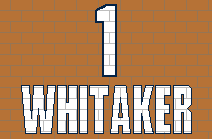
Lou Whitaker's number 1 was retired by the Detroit Tigers in 2022.

Whitaker appeared in 2,390 games for the Detroit Tigers, third most in franchise history behind Ty Cobb and Al Kaline. He also ranks fourth in major-league history with 2,308 games played at second base. He remains among the Tigers' all-time leaders in double plays (first, 1,527), assists (second, 6,653), bases on balls (second, 1,197), runs scored (third, 1,386), strikeouts (third, 1,099), wins above replacement (WAR) by position players (fourth, 75.1), and defensive WAR (second, 16.2). For all second baseman with at least 50% of their games played for a career at the position, Whitaker ranks in the top 15 in hits, runs, and RBIs.

Bill James, in The Bill James Historical Baseball Abstract, rated Whitaker as the thirteenth-best second baseman of all time. Baseball writer Craig Calcaterra wrote that Whitaker was not flashy, but caught everything hit his way, effortlessly turned double plays and made strong, steady throws that "defined great second base defense."

In 2000, Whitaker was inducted into the Michigan Sports Hall of Fame.

In December 2019, the Tigers announced that they would retire Whitaker's No. 1 jersey sometime in 2020. However, the COVID-19 pandemic resulted in the ceremony being postponed. The retirement ceremony ultimately took place in August 2022. At the time, Whitaker said: "I truly tell you, this will be one of the greatest moments of my life. Just knowing that my number will be retired and I'll get a chance to see my name on the wall with some legends from Tiger history. What a great honor." In his speech honoring Whitaker, Alan Trammell, whose number 3 was retired in 2018, stated: "For four years, I've been uncomfortable. I have been extremely honored and grateful to have my number 3 retired. But there wouldn't be a number 3 on the wall without the number 1."

Whitaker was considered for election to the Baseball Hall of Fame by the Baseball Writers' Association of America (BBWAA) in 2001 but received only 15 votes (2.9%). He was later considered by the Modern Baseball Era Committee for the 2020 induction class, but fell short of the required 75% threshold for induction, receiving six votes (37.5%) from the 16-member committee. Whitaker's exclusion from the Hall (particularly him falling off the BBWAA ballot after a single year) has been widely criticized by baseball fans, citing that he meets multiple Hall of Fame standards such as him reaching 2,000 hits and playing with one team his entire career, and his 75.1 Wins Above Replacement are the 3rd most of any player in the live-ball era prior to 2000.

== Family and later years ==
Whitaker married Crystal McCreary in November 1979 at Detroit's Cathedral of the Most Blessed Sacrament. They have four daughters, Asia, Angela, Jessica, and Sarah.

While playing with the Tigers, Whitaker was introduced to the Jehovah's Witnesses by teammate Chet Lemon. After converting to the religion, Whitaker removed the Canadian and American flags from his batting helmet. After retiring from baseball, Whitaker "routinely spent at least 840 hours a year" on missionary work for the church.

In April 1993, Whitaker's pregnant half-sister Judith Grey was killed by gunfire from a passing car in Bridgeport, Connecticut. Emergency workers opened her chest and squeezed the heart to maintain blood flow to the baby, which was born alive at the hospital.

After retiring as a player, Whitaker became an instructor for the Tigers during their spring training sessions in Lakeland, Florida, where he helped coaching hitters through the 2009 season. He and the Tigers parted ways in 2010 by mutual agreement.

== See also ==
- List of Major League Baseball career home run leaders
- List of Gold Glove middle infield duos
- List of Major League Baseball career hits leaders
- List of Major League Baseball career runs scored leaders
- List of Major League Baseball career runs batted in leaders
- List of Major League Baseball players who spent their entire career with one franchise
