= Chet Lemon =

American baseball player (1955–2025)

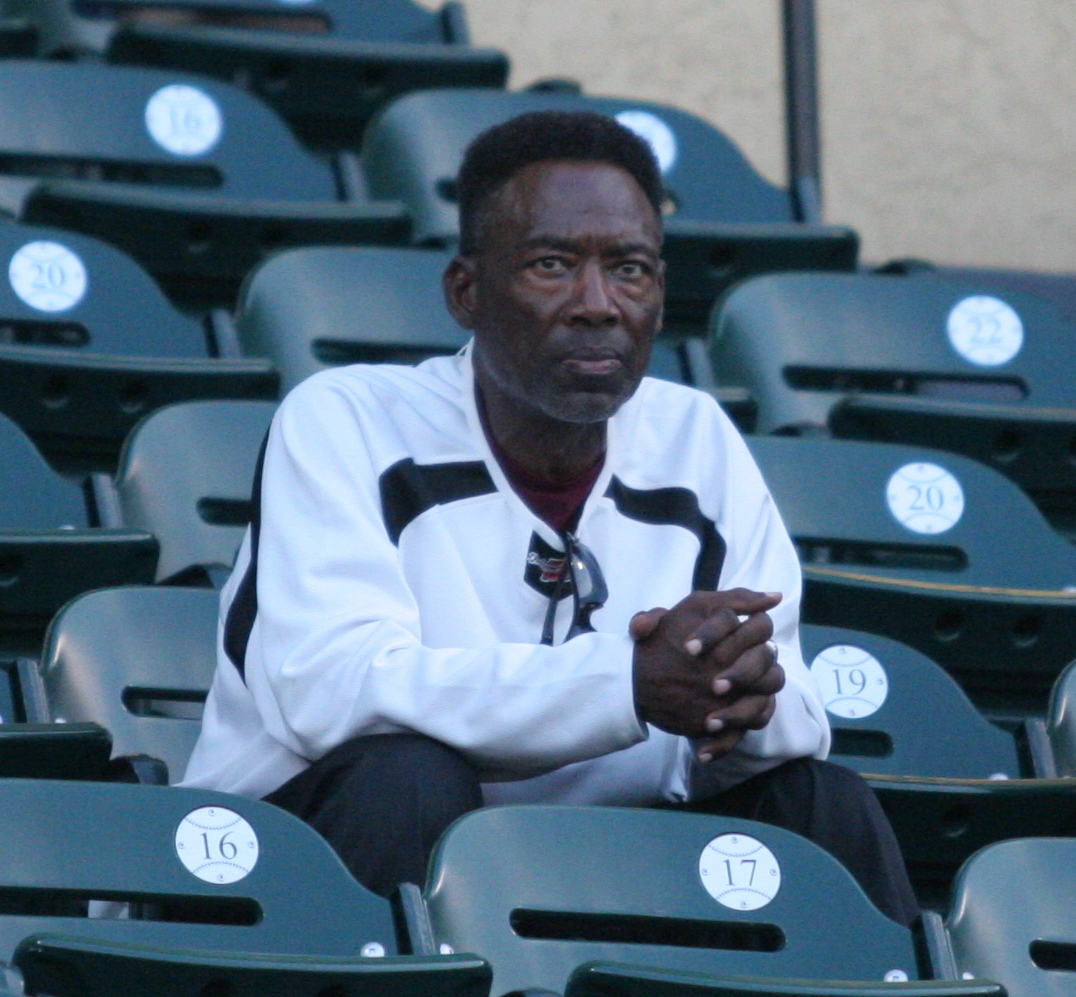
- Lemon in 2012
- Outfielder
- Born: February 12, 1955; Jackson, Mississippi, U.S.
- Died: May 8, 2025 (aged 70); Apopka, Florida, U.S.
- Batted: Right Threw: Right

MLB debut
- September 9, 1975, for the Chicago White Sox

Last MLB appearance
- October 3, 1990, for the Detroit Tigers

MLB statistics
- Batting average: .273
- Home runs: 215
- Runs batted in: 884
- Stats at Baseball Reference

Teams
- Chicago White Sox (1975–1981); Detroit Tigers (1982–1990)

Career highlights and awards
- 3× All-Star (1978, 1979, 1984); World Series champion (1984)

Chester Earl Lemon (February 12, 1955 – May 8, 2025) was an American professional baseball outfielder. He played sixteen seasons in Major League Baseball (MLB), beginning with the Chicago White Sox in 1975, where he played for six years. He was then traded to the Detroit Tigers, where he played the rest of his career from 1982 to 1990.

A native of Jackson, Mississippi, he grew up in Los Angeles. He was drafted in the first round of the 1972 Major League Baseball draft. He was selected as an American League All-Star in 1978, 1979, and 1984 and was the starting center fielder for the Tigers team that won the 1984 World Series. Lemon was known as one of the best defensive center fielders in baseball from 1977 to 1987. In 1977, he led the American League with 512 outfield putouts, the fourth highest single-season tally in major league history and the highest tally since 1951. He also totaled over 400 outfield putouts in four other years (1979 and 1983–1985). He led the American League with 44 doubles in 1979 and also led the league in times hit by pitch (HBP) four times, including a career-high 20 HBP in 1983. After his playing career ended, he became a baseball instructor and coach.

== Early years ==
Lemon was born on February 12, 1955, in Jackson, Mississippi, and moved to Los Angeles when he was six months old. He attended John C. Fremont High School, where he played in the backfield with Ricky Bell on the football team and also starred on the baseball team.

== Professional baseball ==
=== Minor leagues ===
Lemon was drafted in the first round (22nd overall) of the 1972 Major League Baseball draft by the Oakland Athletics. He began his professional baseball career in 1972 playing for the Athletics' minor league team in Coos Bay-North Bend, Oregon. After 38 games in Oregon, he moved up to the Burlington Bees in the Midwest League. He remained with Burlington through the 1973 and 1974 seasons.

Lemon was traded along with Dave Hamilton from the Athletics to the Chicago White Sox for Stan Bahnsen and Skip Pitlock at the non-waiver trade deadline on June 15, 1975. During the 1975 season, he batted .307 with eight home runs and 49 runs batted in for the Triple A Denver Bears.

=== Chicago White Sox ===
An infielder in the minor leagues, Lemon played third base during his brief stint with the Chicago White Sox in 1975. He entered spring training 1976 as the leading candidate for the third base job, but after failing to impress manager Paul Richards with his glove, was moved to the outfield. He made the transition seamlessly, as he made only three errors all season while logging a .992 fielding percentage in centerfield. He batted .246 with four home runs, 38 RBIs, and 46 runs scored.

He came into his own as both a hitter and centerfielder in 1977. He scored a career high 99 runs, while showing a dramatic increase in power, hitting fifteen more home runs than he had his rookie season. He also set an American League record with 524 total chances and 512 putouts in the outfield, a record that still stands.

With the White Sox in sixth place in the American League West, ahead only of the expansion Seattle Mariners, Lemon was selected as his team's lone representative at the 1978 All-Star Game. Though he did not receive an at-bat, he entered the game in left field in the eighth inning, and committed an error in the National League's four-run eighth. The White Sox finished the season in fifth, eventually passing the Oakland A's in the standings. Lemon went 2-for-5 on the second-to-last day of the season to bring his season batting average to .300.

In 1979, Lemon was again the sole White Sox player on the American League All-Star team. He entered the game in the second inning, and scored in the third after being hit by a Joaquín Andújar pitch. He ended the season with a .318 batting average, a career high. He also hit 44 doubles, tying the Milwaukee Brewers' Cecil Cooper for the American League season best total. Lemon recorded 411 putouts in 1979. That season was the first of four seasons that he led the league in times hit by pitch.

The White Sox finished near the bottom of the division standings during most of Lemon's tenure with the club. With the addition of free agent catcher Carlton Fisk and designated hitter Greg Luzinski, the team improved to 31–22 and finished in third in the first half of the strike shortened 1981 season. For his part, Lemon batted .299 with three home runs and 22 RBIs in the first half. Though his team finished in sixth place in the second half, his stats improved, as he batted .305 with six home runs and drove in 28. Following the season, Lemon was traded to the Detroit Tigers for outfielder Steve Kemp.

=== Detroit Tigers ===
==== 1982 and 1983 seasons ====
On November 27, 1981, the Detroit Tigers acquired Lemon in a trade that sent Steve Kemp to the Chicago White Sox.

In his first season with Detroit, Lemon shifted from his regular position in center field, starting 92 games in right field and 25 in center field. The 1982 Tigers compiled an 83–79 record and finished fourth in American League East (AL East). Lemon 's batting average dropped to .266, 38 points lower than he had averaged in the preceding four years. Newspaper columnist Mike Downey opined that uprooting Lemon and his young family, along with a torn rib cage, damaged ligaments in his left wrist, and several pulled muscles, had resulted in the worst season in his major league career. Lemon later noted that moving to right field also affected him: "Playing right field wasn't real difficult. I didn't want to play it, that was my problem. It affected me so much mentally. I wasn't happy."

Despite Lemon's 1982 performance, the Tigers signed Lemon to a five-year contract in November 1982. The contract paid Lemon an estimated $450,000 a year.

In 1983, Lemon became the Tigers' regular center fielder, starting 133 games at the position. With only three errors in 417 chances, he provided the club with solid defense in the middle of the outfield. It was the first of three consecutive seasons where he had more than 400 putouts. Manager Sparky Anderson in July 1983 called Lemon "the best defensive center fielder I've been around." On July 24, 1983, he gained national attention for a leaping catch that deprived Rod Carew of a game-winning home run in the 12th inning. Lemon also developed power with a career-high 24 home runs in 1983, and he led the American League with a career-high 20 times being hit by pitch. However, his batting average fell to .255. His overall contributions helped the 1983 Tigers improve to 92–70, good for second in AL East.

==== 1984 season ====
In 1984, the Tigers opened with a 35–5 record, won the American League East by 15 games, and defeated the San Diego Padres in the 1984 World Series. Lemon played a key role on the 1984 championship team. Defensively, he started 135 games in center field and compiled a career-high .995 fielding percentage with only two errors in 438 chances. Offensively, his batting average jumped more than 30 points to .287, and his 60 extra-base hits tied Kirk Gibson for the most on the team. His 20 home runs and 76 RBIs ranked third on the 1984 Tigers team. Lemon was also the starting center fielder for the American League at the 1984 All-Star game.

Reaching the post-season for the first time in his career, Lemon went hitless in thirteen at-bats in the Tigers' three-game sweep of the Kansas City Royals in the 1984 American League Championship Series. He improved in the World Series, batting .294 with a run scored and a run batted in. He also had "a Willie Mays–style back-to-the-plate catch" on a Terry Kennedy drive to preserve the Tigers' lead in the seventh inning of Game 3.

==== 1985–1989 ====
In March 1985, the Tigers signed Lemon to a contract extension running through the 1991 season with a club option to extend through 1992. The extension was reported to be worth $4.5 million.

He remained the Tigers' starting center fielder for three more seasons, playing 144 games at the position in 1985, 124 games in 1986, and 145 games in 1987. In 1987, he hit at least 20 home runs and 30 doubles for the third time in his career. He also ranked among the league's leading center fielders with a .992 fielding percentage (second), 348 putouts (third), and a 2.70 range factor (fourth), and helped the 1987 Tigers win the AL East with a record of 98–64.

In 1988, the Tigers moved Lemon moved to right field to make room for speedy new acquisition Gary Pettis. He played 144 games in right field in 1988 and 111 games in 1989.

==== Polycythemia and retirement ====
In the spring of 1990, Lemon was diagnosed with polycythemia vera, a rare blood disorder. During the 1990 season, he missed 47 games with multiple injuries and went through a divorce that affected his concentration. He failed to hit a home run between early May and late September and concluded the 1990 season with a career-low 378 at bats and only 32 RBIs.

Lemon returned to spring training in 1991, but he was injured for much of the training camp. He was waived by the Tigers on April 5, three days before opening day.

In August 1991, Lemon was hospitalized in the intensive care unit at the University of Florida Shands Hospital with a blood clot in his abdomen. He was discharged after almost four weeks of treatment.

In December 2001, he underwent surgery at the Mayo Clinic to have his spleen removed.

=== Career statistics ===
G	PA	AB	R	H	2B	3B	HR	RBI	SB	BB	HBP	SO	BA	OBP	SLG	Fld%
1988	7872	6868	973	1875	396	61	215	884	58	749	151	1024	.273	.355	.442	.984

== Personal life, illness and death ==
Lemon was married to Valerie Jones. They had four children, Geneva (born c. 1972), Chester Jr. (born c. 1977), David (born 1981), and Marcus (born 1988). David and Marcus both followed their father into baseball. Marcus played minor league baseball from 2006 to 2017.

Lemon was divorced from his first wife in 1990. He married Gigi Partee in the early 1990s. They had a daughter, Brianna, born in 1998.

Lemon became a member of the Jehovah's Witnesses while playing in the minor leagues in the 1970s. He was introduced to the religion by Jerry Hairston Sr. while they were teammates in the Chicago White Sox organization. Due to his religious faith, Lemon declined to stand for "The Star-Spangled Banner", a point for which he was sometimes criticized. In a 1987 interview, Lemon explained:

I believe in God's kingdom. I acknowledge God's kingdom over earth. I give my allegiance to him and not to the flag. I am grateful to be in the United States, grateful to be able to live in the U.S. and have the opportunity to have my beliefs and go door to door to share them. But the national anthem is a ritual. You have to think about what's being said – rockets' red glare, bombs bursting in air? We do not believe in nor do we salute war.

In 1993, Lemon established the Chet Lemon Baseball School in Lake Mary, Florida. He coached two successful AAU teams, Chet Lemon's Juice (18 and under) and Chet Lemon's Juice II (14 and under) in Eustis, Florida. Several players who played on those teams eventually became MLB players, most notably with Zack Greinke and Prince Fielder. He was also the head coach for Eustis High School, where he led the Panthers to the 2003 state championship.

In August 2024, ahead of the Detroit Tigers 40th Anniversary World Series Championship reunion in Detroit, Lemon's family revealed that polycythemia vera, a rare blood disorder, had led to a series of strokes, which left him unable to speak or walk.

Lemon died at his home in Apopka, Florida, on May 8, 2025, at the age of 70.

== See also ==
- List of Major League Baseball annual doubles leaders
