= Dave Rozema =

American baseball player (born 1956)

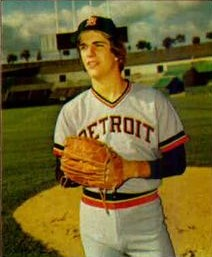
- Pitcher
- Born: August 5, 1956 (age 70); Grand Rapids, Michigan, U.S.
- Batted: Right Threw: Right

MLB debut
- April 11, 1977, for the Detroit Tigers

Last MLB appearance
- April 30, 1986, for the Texas Rangers

MLB statistics
- Win–loss record: 60–53
- Earned run average: 3.47
- Strikeouts: 448
- Stats at Baseball Reference

Teams
- Detroit Tigers (1977–1984); Texas Rangers (1985–1986)

Career highlights and awards
- World Series champion (1984)

David Scott Rozema (/ˈroʊzmɑː/ ROHZ-mah; born August 5, 1956) is an American former professional baseball pitcher who played ten seasons in Major League Baseball (MLB), for the Detroit Tigers and Texas Rangers. Listed at 6' 4", 185 lb., Rozema batted and threw right-handed.

== Early life ==
Rozema was born in Grand Rapids, Michigan, in 1956. He attended Grand Rapids Central High School. In his junior and senior seasons, he was an all-city pitcher for the baseball team, compiling records of 11–3 and 11–5. He was drafted by the San Francisco Giants in the 22nd round of the 1974 June amateur draft, but he did not sign with the Giants, instead enrolling at Grand Rapids Community College.

== Professional baseball ==
=== Minor leagues ===
In January 1975, Rozema was drafted by the Detroit Tigers in the fourth round of the secondary phase of the draft. He signed with the Tigers on January 22, 1975, and was assigned to the Class A Clinton Pilots managed by Jim Leyland. Rozema began the 1975 season in the bullpen, but impressed Leyland, and was promoted to the starting rotation. He relied principally on his fastball, but learned to throw a slider while with Clinton. He appeared in 27 games for the Pilots, compiling a 14–5 record and a 2.09 earned run average (ERA). In July 1975, he was selected by the Detroit Free Press as the "Tiger of the Future".

In 1976, Rozema was promoted to the Tigers' Double-A Montgomery Rebels. Despite missing two months with an elbow injury, he compiled a 12–4 record with a 1.57 ERA. Montgomery manager Les Moss said of Rozema: "That kid has all the tools. If he keeps pitching like that, he won’t be around here long. He’s an outstanding prospect."

=== 1977 season ===
Rozema attended the Tigers' 1977 spring camp as a nonroster player, but impressed manager Ralph Houk and made the major league roster without ever having played a game at the Triple-A level. He made his major league debut at age 20 and, 10 days later, threw a four-hit shutout against the Boston Red Sox. Despite missing the last three weeks of the season with a shoulder injury, he finished his rookie season with a 15–7 record and a 3.09 ERA and led the Tigers in wins, ERA, complete games (16), and innings pitched (218), and ranked third in the league in winning percentage (.682), fifth in adjusted ERA+ (138), sixth in strikeout-to-walk ratio (2.71), and eighth in complete games.

He won post-season honors as the American League Rookie Pitcher of the Year and the Tigers' rookie of the year. He also finished fourth in the voting for Rookie of the Year and ninth for the American League Cy Young Award. Rozema formed part of a distinguished group of rookies with the 1977 Tigers that included Jack Morris, Alan Trammell, Lou Whitaker, Lance Parrish and Steve Kemp.

=== Middle years: 1978–1981 ===
After a promising rookie year, Rozema never won more than nine games in a season. In 1978, he finished with a 9–12 record, 11 complete games and an adjusted ERA+ of 124. In 1979, he again had an above-average adjusted ERA+ of 124, but he started only 16 games and had a record of 4–4. Afterwards, Rozema's ERA fell off to a rate only slightly better than the league average, as he won six games in 1980 and five in 1981.

=== 1982 season and karate kick ===
Rozema got off to a tremendous start in 1982, compiling a 3–0 record and an ERA of 1.63 (adjusted ERA+ of 248) in his first eight games. In a televised game against the Minnesota Twins on May 14, a bench-clearing brawl erupted after Twins pitchers hit both Chet Lemon and Enos Cabell. Rozema ran from the dugout and attempted to deliver a flying karate kick to the Twins' John Castino, but he missed Castino and tore eight ligaments in his knee. As a result, Rozema had to be carried off the field on a stretcher. He required a knee surgery the next day and was put on the disabled list for the rest of the 1982 season.

In October 2006, Sports Illustrated selected Rozema as one of the "10 Greatest Characters in Detroit Tigers History". His selection was based on (1) the "karate kick" misfire, (2) a subsequent injury the same year in which Rozema fell on a flask in his back pocket and needed 11 stitches in his hip, (3) an incident in which he shoved a bar glass into the face of teammate Alan Trammell resulting in 47 stitches near Trammell's eye, (4) missing a team bus when he overslept after judging a wet T-shirt contest, and (5) using Brillo pads to wash his new car.

On July 9, 2008, the minor league team in Rozema's home town, the West Michigan Whitecaps, gave away an unusual promotional item, "Dave Rozema Karate Kick Bobbleleg" figures.

=== Later years: 1983–1986 ===
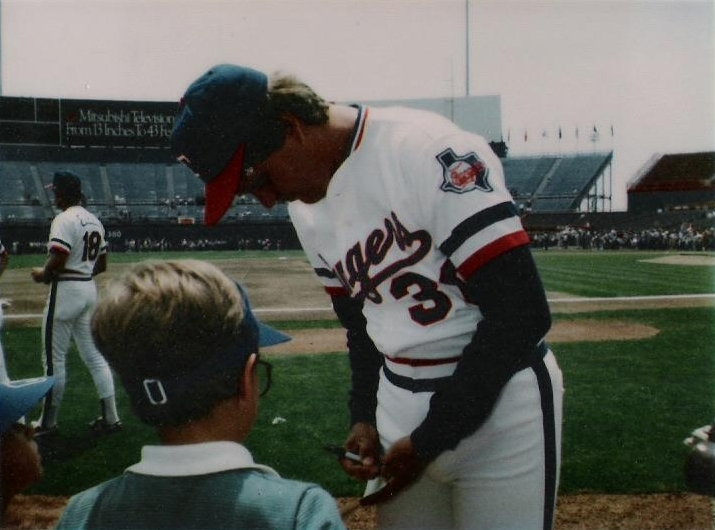
Rozema with the Texas Rangers in 1985

Rozema came back from the injury in 1983 with an 8–3 record and 3.43 ERA in 105 innings pitched. In addition, he played on the 1984 Tigers team that won the World Series. During the regular season, he started 16 games, compiling a 7–6 record with a 3.74 ERA in 101 innings pitched, but did not appear in the post-season.

On December 27, 1984, Rozema signed as a free agent with the Texas Rangers a contract for an estimated total of $500,000 to $600,000. He appeared in 34 games for the Rangers in 1985 (all but four in relief) and had a 4.19 ERA in 88 innings pitched. After compiling a 5.91 ERA at the start of the 1986 season, Rozema was released by the Rangers during the midseason. He then was signed as a free agent by the Chicago White Sox on May 20, 1986, but did not play for them.

In a 10-season career, Rozema posted a 60–53 record with a 3.47 ERA in 248 pitching appearances (132 starts), striking out 448 batters while walking 258 in 1106 innings of work.

== Life after major league baseball ==
In the early 1990s, Rozema pitched for the St. Petersburg Pelicans of the Senior Professional Baseball Association, and with the London Majors of the Intercounty Baseball League based in London, Ontario, Canada.

On December 22, 1985, Rozema and his former teammate Kirk Gibson married sisters, JoAnn and Sandy Sklarski in a double ceremony at Grosse Pointe Memorial Church in Grosse Pointe Farms, Michigan.

In 2003, Crain's Detroit Business reported that Rozema was working as a salesman for Disposal Management LLC of Bloomfield Hills, Michigan, selling the company's services to waste generators in the Detroit area.

For several years, Rozema threw batting practice at Comerica Park in charity fundraising events for the Detroit Tigers Foundation. He would joke, "I've probably thrown more pitches in Comerica Park than anyone else."
