= Pat Underwood =

American baseball player (born 1957)

- Pitcher
- Born: February 9, 1957 (age 69); Kokomo, Indiana, U.S.
- Batted: Left Threw: Left

MLB debut
- May 31, 1979, for the Detroit Tigers

Last MLB appearance
- June 21, 1983, for the Detroit Tigers

MLB statistics
- Win–loss record: 13–18
- Earned run average: 4.43
- Strikeouts: 188
- Stats at Baseball Reference

Teams
- Detroit Tigers (1979–1983)

Patrick John Underwood (born February 9, 1957) is an American former Major League Baseball pitcher who played from 1979 to 1983. Underwood was drafted by the Detroit Tigers in the first round of the 1976 Major League Baseball draft, as the second pick overall. His older brother, Tom was also a pitcher. Pat made his major league debut against Tom. It is the first time in major league history this has occurred.

== Minor league career ==
Underwood spent the next several seasons in the Tigers' farm system. He had a record of 6–2 in 1976 with the Advanced A level Lakeland Flying Tigers in the Florida State League and an earned run average of 2.22. Underwood split the 1977 season at different levels in the minors, spending the first half of the year at Montgomery in the AA Southern League, where he had a record of 9–2 and an ERA of 3.38 with 64 strikeouts in 104 innings of work. At Evansville Triplets in the AAA American Association, Underwood went 3–5 with a 5.22 ERA. He spent the entire 1978 season in Evansville, finishing with a 5–5 record and a 4.15 ERA.

== Detroit Tigers ==
Underwood started the 1979 season in Evansville and had a 2–3 record and an ERA of 2.81. He was called up by the Tigers and pitched his first game on May 31 against the Toronto Blue Jays at Exhibition Stadium. Making the start for the Jays was his brother, Tom.

Tom found the whole thing stupid, but the brothers brought their best. Pat did not give up a hit until the fifth inning. Tom allowed four hits and struck out four in keeping the Tigers scoreless through seven. Then, Tigers center fielder Jerry Morales led off the eighth with a home run. Pat pitched into the ninth before handing the game over to the bullpen with one out. For Tom, it was a complete game loss.

Underwood also started against the Chicago White Sox on the famed Disco Demolition Night at Comiskey Park, going 7 1/3 innings and giving up just one run in what was supposed to be game 1 of a doubleheader. With the Tigers, he had a 6–4 record and an ERA of 4.59 with 83 strikeouts in 27 appearances.

Underwood spent the entire 1981 season with the Tigers, switching from starting to relieving. He had a 3–6 record that season and five saves, with an ERA of 3.59. In 1982, Underwood was back in the minor leagues at Evansville, where he was used exclusively as a starting pitcher, and had a record of 9–8 with an ERA of 3.98, with 90 strikeouts in 165 innings.

With the Tigers in 1983, Underwood pitched in four games and had an ERA of 8.71. His final major league appearance was on June 21, 1983, when he gave up five runs in two innings as part of a 10–3 loss to the Milwaukee Brewers. The Tigers traded Underwood on June 30, 1983, to the Cincinnati Reds in exchange for third baseman Wayne Krenchicki. He split the season in the minor leagues between Evansville with the Tigers and at the Indianapolis Indians of the International League for the Reds. Between the two teams, Underwood finished with a record of 7-4 and a 4.09 ERA.

== Post-Tigers career ==
Underwood was drafted by the Texas Rangers on December 5, 1983, from the Reds in the 1983 Rule 5 draft, but the Rangers released him before the start of the 1984 season. He signed with the Baltimore Orioles on April 2, 1984, as a free agent. Underwood pitched in 1984 for the Rochester Red Wings, the Orioles' AAA affiliate, and had an 0–2 record and an ERA of 9.00 in three appearances in relief.
