= 1986 Detroit Tigers season =

Major League Baseball season

1986 Detroit Tigers
- League: American League
- Division: East
- Ballpark: Tiger Stadium
- City: Detroit, Michigan
- Record: 87–75 (.537)
- Divisional place: 3rd
- Owners: Tom Monaghan
- General managers: Bill Lajoie
- Managers: Sparky Anderson
- Television: WDIV-TV (George Kell, Al Kaline); PASS (Larry Osterman, Jim Northrup)
- Radio: WJR (Ernie Harwell, Paul Carey)

The 1986 Detroit Tigers season was the team's 86th overall and their 75th at Tiger Stadium. The season featured the Detroit Tigers competing to win the American League East.

== Offseason ==
- November 13, 1985: Bárbaro Garbey was traded by the Detroit Tigers to the Oakland Athletics for Dave Collins.
- December 12, 1985: Darnell Coles was traded by the Seattle Mariners to the Detroit Tigers for Rich Monteleone.
- January 16, 1986: Dave Engle was traded by the Minnesota Twins to the Detroit Tigers for Chris Pittaro and Alejandro Sánchez.

== Regular season ==
=== Season standings ===
AL East
Team	W	L	Pct.	GB	Home	Road
Boston Red Sox	95	66	.590	—	51‍–‍30	44‍–‍36
New York Yankees	90	72	.556	5½	41‍–‍39	49‍–‍33
Detroit Tigers	87	75	.537	8½	49‍–‍32	38‍–‍43
Toronto Blue Jays	86	76	.531	9½	42‍–‍39	44‍–‍37
Cleveland Indians	84	78	.519	11½	45‍–‍35	39‍–‍43
Milwaukee Brewers	77	84	.478	18	41‍–‍39	36‍–‍45
Baltimore Orioles	73	89	.451	22½	37‍–‍42	36‍–‍47

=== Record vs. opponents ===
1986 American League record Sources:
Team	BAL	BOS	CAL	CWS	CLE	DET	KC	MIL	MIN	NYY	OAK	SEA	TEX	TOR
Baltimore	—	4–9	6–6	9–3	4–9	1–12	6–6	6–7	8–4	5–8	5–7	6–6	5–7	8–5
Boston	9–4	—	5–7	7–5	10–3	7–6	6–6	6–6	10–2	5–8	7–5	8–4	8–4	7–6
California	6–6	7–5	—	7–6	6–6	7–5	8–5	5–7	7–6	7–5	10–3	8–5	8–5	6–6
Chicago	3–9	5–7	6–7	—	5–7	6–6	7–6	5–7	6–7	6–6	7–6	8–5	2–11	6–6
Cleveland	9–4	3–10	6–6	7–5	—	4–9	8–4	8–5	6–6	5–8	10–2	9–3	6–6	3–10–1
Detroit	12–1	6–7	5–7	6–6	9–4	—	5–7	8–5	7–5	6–7	6–6	6–6	7–5	4–9
Kansas City	6–6	6–6	5–8	6–7	4–8	7–5	—	6–6	6–7	4–8	8–5	5–8	8–5	5–7
Milwaukee	7–6	6–6	7–5	7–5	5–8	5–8	6–6	—	4–8	8–5	5–7	6–6	4–8	7–6
Minnesota	4–8	2–10	6–7	7–6	6–6	5–7	7–6	8–4	—	4–8	6–7	6–7	6–7	4–8
New York	8–5	8–5	5–7	6–6	8–5	7–6	8–4	5–8	8–4	—	5–7	8–4	7–5	7–6
Oakland	7–5	5–7	3–10	6–7	2–10	6–6	5–8	7–5	7–6	7–5	—	10–3	3–10	8–4
Seattle	6–6	4–8	5–8	5–8	3–9	6–6	8–5	6–6	7–6	4–8	3–10	—	4–9	6–6
Texas	7–5	4–8	5–8	11–2	6–6	5–7	5–8	8–4	7–6	5–7	10–3	9–4	—	5–7
Toronto	5–8	6–7	6–6	6–6	10–3–1	9–4	7–5	6–7	8–4	6–7	4–8	6–6	7–5	—

=== Notable transactions ===
- April 25, 1986: Brian Harper was signed as a free agent with the Detroit Tigers.
- August 10, 1986: Ken Hill was traded by the Detroit Tigers with a player to be named later to the St. Louis Cardinals for Mike Heath. The Detroit Tigers sent Mike Laga (September 2, 1986) to the St. Louis Cardinals to complete the trade.
- August 10, 1986: Dave Engel was released by the Detroit Tigers.

=== Roster ===
1986 Detroit Tigers
Roster
Pitchers: 39 Bill Campbell; 43 Chuck Cary; 21 Willie Hernández; 45 Bryan Kelly; 25 Eric King; 40 Dave LaPoint; 36 Jack Lazorko; 47 Jack Morris; 49 Randy O'Neal; 27 John Pacella; 46 Dan Petry; 17 Bill Scherrer; 20 Jim Slaton; 26 Frank Tanana; 35 Walt Terrell; 30 Mark Thurmond	Catchers: 8 Mike Heath; 12 Dwight Lowry; 33 Matt Nokes; 13 Lance Parrish; Infielders: 9 Doug Baker; 14 Dave Bergman; 16 Tom Brookens; 19 Darnell Coles; 10 Dave Engle; 41 Darrell Evans; 4 Mike Laga; 18 Scotti Madison; 27 Harry Spilman; 3 Alan Trammell; 1 Lou Whitaker	Outfielders: 29 Dave Collins; 37 Bruce Fields; 23 Kirk Gibson; 30 Johnny Grubb; 32 Brian Harper; 31 Larry Herndon; 34 Chet Lemon; 15 Pat Sheridan; 38 Tim Tolman	Manager: 11 Sparky Anderson; Coaches: 50 Billy Consolo; 51 Alex Grammas; 56 Billy Muffett; 28 Vada Pinson; 53 Dick Tracewski

== Player stats ==
= Indicates team leader

=== Batting ===
Note: Pos= Position; G = Games played; AB = At bats; H = Hits; Avg. = Batting average; HR = Home runs; RBI = Runs batted in

Pos	Player	G	AB	H	Avg.	HR	RBI
C	Lance Parrish	91	327	84	.257	22	62
1B	Darrell Evans	151	507	122	.241	29	85
2B	Lou Whitaker	144	584	157	.269	20	73
SS	Alan Trammell	151	574	159	.277	21	75
3B	Darnell Coles	142	521	142	.273	20	86
LF	Larry Herndon	106	283	70	.247	8	37
CF	Chet Lemon	126	403	101	.251	12	53
RF	Kirk Gibson	119	441	118	.268	28	86
DH	Johnny Grubb	81	210	70	.333	13	51

=== Other batters ===
Note: G = Games played; AB = at bats; H = Hits; Avg. = Batting average; HR = Home runs; RBI = Runs batted in

Player	G	AB	H	Avg.	HR	RBI
Dave Collins	124	419	113	.270	1	27
Tom Brookens	98	281	76	.270	3	25
Pat Sheridan	98	236	56	.237	6	19
Dwight Lowry	56	150	46	.307	3	18
Dave Bergman	65	130	30	.231	1	9
Mike Heath	30	98	26	.265	4	11
Dave Engle	35	86	22	.256	0	4
Harry Spilman	24	49	12	.245	3	8
Mike Laga	15	45	9	.200	3	8
Bruce Fields	16	43	12	.279	0	6
Brian Harper	19	36	5	.139	0	3
Tim Tolman	16	34	6	.176	0	2
Doug Baker	13	24	3	.125	0	0
Matt Nokes	7	24	8	.333	1	2
Scotti Madison	2	7	0	.000	0	1

=== Starting pitchers ===
Note; G = Games; IP = Innings pitched; W = Wins; L = Losses; ERA = Earned run average; SO = Strikeouts

Player	G	IP	W	L	ERA	SO
Jack Morris	35	267.0	21	8	3.27	223
Walt Terrell	34	217.1	15	12	4.56	93
Frank Tanana	32	188.1	12	9	4.16	119
Dan Petry	20	116.0	5	10	4.66	56

=== Other pitchers ===
Note; G = Games; IP = Innings pitched; W = Wins; L = Losses; ERA = Earned run average; SO = Strikeouts

Player	G	IP	W	L	ERA	SO
Eric King	33	138.1	11	4	3.51	79
Randy O'Neal	37	122.2	3	7	4.33	68
Dave LaPoint	16	67.2	3	6	5.72	36
Bryan Kelly	6	20.0	1	2	4.50	18

=== Relief pitchers ===
Note; G = Games; W = Wins; L = Losses; SV = Saves; ERA = Earned run average; SO = Strikeouts

Player	G	W	L	SV	ERA	SO
Willie Hernández	64	8	7	24	3.55	77
Bill Campbell	34	3	6	3	3.88	37
Mark Thurmond	25	4	1	3	1.92	17
Jim Slaton	22	0	0	2	4.05	12
Chuck Cary	22	1	2	0	3.41	21
Bill Scherrer	13	0	1	0	7.29	16
John Pacella	5	0	0	1	4.09	5
Jack Lazorko	3	0	0	0	4.05	3

== Farm system ==
Level	Team	League	Manager
AAA	Nashville Sounds	American Association	Leon Roberts
AA	Glens Falls Tigers	Eastern League	Bob Schaefer
A	Lakeland Tigers	Florida State League	Tom Burgess
A	Gastonia Tigers	South Atlantic League	Johnny Lipon
Rookie	Bristol Tigers	Appalachian League	Tom Gamboa
