= 1984 Detroit Tigers season =

Major League Baseball season

1984 Detroit Tigers
- World Series champions American League champions American League East champions
- League: American League
- Division: East
- Ballpark: Tiger Stadium
- City: Detroit, Michigan
- Record: 104–58 (.642)
- Divisional place: 1st
- Owners: Tom Monaghan
- General managers: Bill Lajoie
- Managers: Sparky Anderson
- Television: WDIV-TV (George Kell, Al Kaline); PASS (Bill Freehan, Larry Osterman)
- Radio: WJR (Ernie Harwell, Paul Carey)

The 1984 Detroit Tigers season was the team's 84th season and the 73rd season at Tiger Stadium; the Tigers won the 1984 World Series, defeating the San Diego Padres in five games. The season was their 84th since they entered the American League in 1901.

It was the franchise's best season in terms of overall wins (104) and their best win percentage (.642) in a 162-game season. The Tigers led the American League East wire-to-wire, opening the season 9–0 and eventually topping out at 35–5 (.875) after 40 games, with a 17–0 road record.

The team won its first Division title since 1972, their first American League championship since 1968 (ninth overall), and the franchise's fourth (and most recent) World Series.

Detroit relief pitcher Willie Hernández won the Cy Young Award and was chosen as the American League Most Valuable Player.

== Players ==
=== Catcher: Parrish ===
Catcher Lance Parrish, known as the "Big Wheel", led the team in home runs (33) and RBIs (98) -- and strikeouts (120) as well. Parrish was the starting catcher for the American League All Star team and won the Gold Glove and Silver Slugger Awards in 1984. He hit 2 home runs and had 5 RBIs in postseason play.

=== Infield: Bergman, Whitaker, Trammell and Johnson ===
Dave Bergman was acquired from the Giants (via the Phillies) in March 1984 and became the Tigers' principal first baseman, playing 114 games at the position. He hit .273 in the regular season, but failed to get a hit in 5 games of the 1984 World Series. On June 4, 1984, Bergman had an 11th inning at-bat at home in a big game against second-place Toronto, who at that point trailed the Tigers by only five games. The at-bat lasted 13 pitches (7 minutes), with Bergman fouling off seven straight pitches from Roy Lee Jackson before hitting a walk-off, three-run home run. Sparky Anderson called it the greatest at-bat he had ever seen.

Second baseman Lou Whitaker, known as "Sweet Lou", had his best year in 1983, hitting .320 with 40 doubles and 206 hits. Though his batting numbers were much lower in 1984 (.289 average, 25 doubles and 161 hits), he was selected as the starting second baseman for the American League All Star team and won the Gold Glove and Silver Slugger Awards in 1984.

Shortstop Alan Trammell had a big year in 1984. His .314 batting average was 5th best in the American League and 25 points higher than any other Tiger. He was selected for the American League All Star team and won his 4th Gold Glove award at shortstop. Trammell was also named the Most Valuable Player of the 1984 World Series after batting .450, driving in 6 runs and hitting 2 home runs.

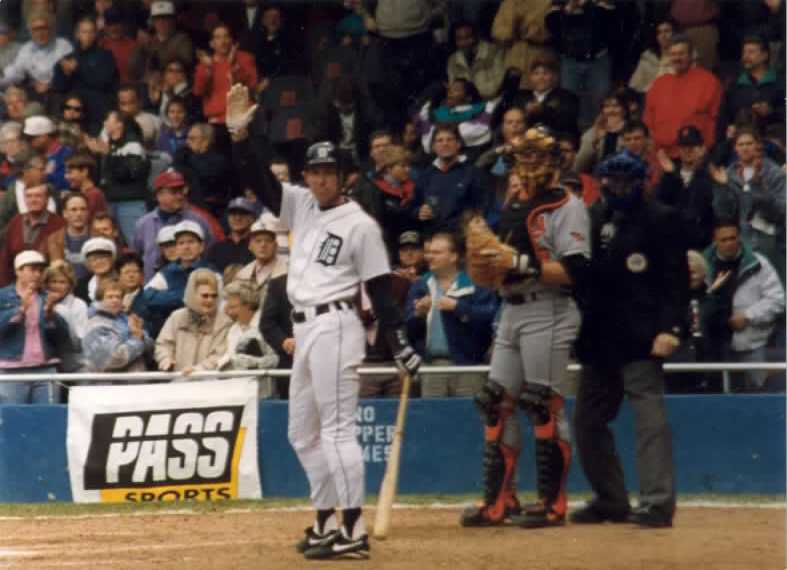
World Series MVP Alan Trammell

Third base was a weak spot in the Detroit lineup, with light-hitting Tom Brookens entering as the starter from 1980 to 1983. In 1984, manager Sparky Anderson searched for the right third baseman, as five different players appeared in 19 or more games at the position that season: 108 by Howard Johnson, 68 by Brookens, 33 by Marty Castillo, 20 by Bárbaro Garbey, and 19 by Darrell Evans.

Howard Johnson, nicknamed "HoJo", was the starting third baseman on Opening Day and through most of the 1984 season. Johnson had a disappointing year, batting .248 with 12 home runs and 50 RBIs. In the 1984 World Series, Sparky Anderson gave the third base job to Marty Castillo, and HoJo had only 1 pinch-hit at bat. Johnson was traded to the Mets less than 2 months after the World Series, and went on to have some big years in New York (36 HRs, 101 RBIs in 1989).

=== Outfield: Gibson, Lemon and Herndon ===
The image of Kirk Gibson with his arms raised above his head after hitting a 3-run home run in the 1984 World Series has become the iconic symbol of the Tigers' 1984 season. The blast came off Goose Gossage, the best reliever in the National League, in the 8th inning of the 5th and final game. It put the Tigers ahead, 8–4, and sealed the championship. During the regular season, the Detroit area native played right field and led the team with a .516 slugging percentage. He also contributed 27 home runs, 91 RBIs and 29 stolen bases, and was #6 in the American League Most Valuable Player voting.

Chet Lemon was the starting center fielder in the 1984 All Star game and a major contributor to the Tigers' success in 1984. One of the best defensive outfielders in baseball, Lemon had 427 putouts in 1984 with a .995 fielding percentage; his 3.09 Range factor rating was far above the league average of 2.17. Lemon also contributed to the team's offensive output with a .287 batting average, 20 home runs, 34 doubles, 76 RBIs, and a.495 slugging percentage.

Larry Herndon played 117 games in left field for the 1984 Tigers and hit .280. In the World Series, he had a .333 batting average and hit a home run. His 2-run homer in Game 1 was the difference in a 3–2 Tigers win. He also caught the final out of the World Series, a fly ball off the bat of Tony Gwynn.

=== Pitching: Morris, Petry, Wilcox, Hernandez, Rozema, and Lopez ===
Jack Morris was the leader of the Tigers pitching staff. He threw a no-hitter in April and was 10–1 before the end of May. He was selected for the 1984 All Star team, but finished the season 9–10 from June through September. He was 19–11 in the regular season with a 3.60 ERA. He won all three of his post-season starts, tossing two complete games and allowing only five earned runs in 25 innings (1.80 ERA).

The team's #2 starter, Dan Petry, finished the year 18–8 with the 3rd best winning percentage (.692) in the American League. His 3.24 ERA in the regular season was the lowest among the Tiger starters.

The team's #3 starter, Milt Wilcox, was 17–8 with a 4.00 ERA. Wilcox was 2–0 in the post-season, giving up only 1 run in 14 innings. He combined with the bullpen to shut out the Royals, 1–0, in the third and final game of the ALCS.

Though Morris was the ace, the Tigers' MVP was Willie Hernández. The Tigers traded John Wockenfuss and Glenn Wilson to the Phillies in March for Hernández and Dave Bergman. Hernández appeared in a team record 80 games for the 1984 Tigers and was virtually untouchable. He allowed 96 hits and only 6 home runs while throwing an incredible 140 1/3 innings out of the bullpen, and finished the season with a stellar 1.92 ERA. His Adjusted ERA+ of 204 is one of the highest in Detroit Tigers history. With 32 saves and 68 games finished, Hernandez won the Cy Young Award and was voted the American League's Most Valuable Player. His 32 saves came in 33 opportunities, his only blown save coming in late September after the Tigers had already secured the AL East Division title. Hernandez saved three post-season games, including the series-clinching games in both the ALCS and World Series.

The popular Aurelio López, known as "Señor Smoke", also had a strong season as the Tigers #2 relief pitcher. Lopez finished the season with 41 games finished, a record of 10–1 and a 2.94 ERA. He also saved 14 games while pitching 137 2/3 innings. Lopez earned a win in Game 2 of the ALCS, tossing three scoreless innings as the Tigers won in 11 innings. Almost lost in the World Series Game 5 hitting heroics of Kirk Gibson was Lopez earning the win with 2 1/3 innings of scoreless relief, in which he didn't allow a baserunner.

=== Designated Hitter: Darrell Evans ===
Darrell Evans was the Tigers' big free agent signing before the 1984 season. Though he had big years in 1985 (40 HRs, 94 RBIs) and 1987 (34 HRs, 99 RBIs), Evans struggled in his first year in the American League, batting .232 with 16 home runs and 63 RBIs. In the 1984 World Series, Evans went 1-for-15 for an .067 batting average.

=== Role players: Garbey, Jones, Kuntz and Castillo ===
The 1984 Tigers had several non-starters who made big contributions to the team's success.

As a rookie in 1984, Bárbaro Garbey played in 110 games, including appearances at first base, second base, third base, DH, and each of the outfield positions. Garbey hit .287 and had more RBIs (52) than several starters, including Howard Johnson, Larry Herndon and Dave Bergman.

Ruppert Jones was signed as a free agent one week into the season on April 10, 1984. He played in 79 games, mostly as a backup in left field. Jones contributed 12 home runs and 49 RBIs in only 215 at-bats. His .516 slugging percentage was tied with Kirk Gibson for the team lead.

Slick-fielding outfielder Rusty Kuntz played in 84 games, primarily as a late-inning defensive replacement, and hit .286 in 140 at-bats—easily the best offensive season of his major league career. Kuntz's sacrifice fly in the fifth inning of Game 5 of the 1984 World Series broke a 4–4 tie and turned out to be the game-winning and Series-clinching RBI.

Possibly the most popular of the role players was Marty Castillo. In 1984, Castillo appeared in 70 games as a third baseman and backup catcher, and came through in the clutch at several key moments, including: scoring 3 runs to secure a win on August 26; hitting a home run to beat the Yankees on September 23; collecting the game-winning, pennant clinching RBI in Game 3 of the ALCS, a 1–0 victory; catching the ball at third base for the final out of the ALCS; hitting .333 with a .455 on-base percentage and a .667 slugging percentage in the World Series; hitting a two-run home run in Game 3 of the World Series; and scoring in Game 5 when Kirk Gibson hit his 3-run home run off Goose Gossage.

=== Manager: Sparky Anderson ===
Detroit manager Sparky Anderson is fifth on the all-time list for manager career wins in Major League Baseball, and in 1984 he became the first manager to win the World Series while leading clubs in both leagues. He previously managed the Cincinnati Reds to the 1975 and 1976 championships, but the Reds inexplicably fired him after a second-place finish in the 1978 season. Sparky kept a journal during the 1984 season, which was published under the title "Bless You Boys: Diary of the Detroit Tigers' 1984 Season". On the day the Tigers clinched the pennant, Sparky wrote in his journal: "I have to be honest. I've waited for this day since they fired me in Cincinnati. I think they made a big mistake when they did that. Now no one will ever question me again."

== Offseason ==
- October 21, 1983: Sal Butera was released by the Tigers.
- November 21, 1983: Wayne Krenchicki was purchased from the Tigers by the Cincinnati Reds.

== Regular season ==
=== Season standings ===
AL East
| Team | W | L | Pct. | GB | Home | Road |
|---|---|---|---|---|---|---|
| Detroit Tigers | 104 | 58 | .642 | — | 53‍–‍29 | 51‍–‍29 |
| Toronto Blue Jays | 89 | 73 | .549 | 15 | 49‍–‍32 | 40‍–‍41 |
| New York Yankees | 87 | 75 | .537 | 17 | 51‍–‍30 | 36‍–‍45 |
| Boston Red Sox | 86 | 76 | .531 | 18 | 41‍–‍40 | 45‍–‍36 |
| Baltimore Orioles | 85 | 77 | .525 | 19 | 44‍–‍37 | 41‍–‍40 |
| Cleveland Indians | 75 | 87 | .463 | 29 | 41‍–‍39 | 34‍–‍48 |
| Milwaukee Brewers | 67 | 94 | .416 | 36½ | 38‍–‍43 | 29‍–‍51 |

=== Record vs. opponents ===
1984 American League record Sources:
| Team | BAL | BOS | CAL | CWS | CLE | DET | KC | MIL | MIN | NYY | OAK | SEA | TEX | TOR |
|---|---|---|---|---|---|---|---|---|---|---|---|---|---|---|
| Baltimore | — | 6–7 | 8–4 | 7–5 | 7–6 | 7–6 | 5–7 | 7–6 | 5–7 | 5–8 | 6–6 | 9–3 | 9–3 | 4–9 |
| Boston | 7–6 | — | 9–3 | 7–5 | 10–3 | 7–6 | 3–9 | 9–4 | 6–6 | 7–6 | 7–5 | 4–8 | 5–7 | 5–8 |
| California | 4–8 | 3–9 | — | 8–5 | 8–4 | 4–8 | 6–7 | 8–4 | 4–9 | 8–4 | 7–6 | 9–4 | 5–8 | 7–5 |
| Chicago | 5–7 | 5–7 | 5–8 | — | 8–4 | 4–8 | 5–8 | 7–5 | 8–5 | 7–5 | 6–7 | 5–8 | 5–8 | 4–8 |
| Cleveland | 6–7 | 3–10 | 4–8 | 4–8 | — | 4–9 | 6–6 | 9–4 | 7–5 | 2–11 | 7–5 | 8–4 | 9–3 | 6–7–1 |
| Detroit | 6–7 | 6–7 | 8–4 | 8–4 | 9–4 | — | 7–5 | 11–2 | 9–3 | 7–6 | 9–3 | 6–6 | 10–2 | 8–5 |
| Kansas City | 7–5 | 9–3 | 7–6 | 8–5 | 6–6 | 5–7 | — | 6–6 | 6–7 | 5–7 | 5–8 | 9–4 | 6–7 | 5–7 |
| Milwaukee | 6–7 | 4–9 | 4–8 | 5–7 | 4–9 | 2–11 | 6–6 | — | 5–7 | 6–7 | 4–8 | 6–6 | 5–6 | 10–3 |
| Minnesota | 7–5 | 6–6 | 9–4 | 5–8 | 5–7 | 3–9 | 7–6 | 7–5 | — | 8–4 | 8–5 | 7–6 | 8–5 | 1–11 |
| New York | 8–5 | 6–7 | 4–8 | 5–7 | 11–2 | 6–7 | 7–5 | 7–6 | 4–8 | — | 8–4 | 7–5 | 6–6 | 8–5 |
| Oakland | 6–6 | 5–7 | 6–7 | 7–6 | 5–7 | 3–9 | 8–5 | 8–4 | 5–8 | 4–8 | — | 8–5 | 8–5 | 4–8 |
| Seattle | 3–9 | 8–4 | 4–9 | 8–5 | 4–8 | 6–6 | 4–9 | 6–6 | 6–7 | 5–7 | 5–8 | — | 10–3 | 5–7 |
| Texas | 3–9 | 7–5 | 8–5 | 8–5 | 3–9 | 2–10 | 7–6 | 6–5 | 5–8 | 6–6 | 5–8 | 3–10 | — | 6–6 |
| Toronto | 9–4 | 8–5 | 5–7 | 8–4 | 7–6–1 | 5–8 | 7–5 | 3–10 | 11–1 | 5–8 | 8–4 | 7–5 | 6–6 | — |

=== Roster ===
1984 Detroit Tigers
Roster
| Pitchers: 24 Glenn Abbott; 40 Doug Bair; 44 Juan Berenguer; 21 Willie Hernández; 29 Aurelio López; 48 Roger Mason; 42 Sid Monge; 47 Jack Morris; 49 Randy O'Neal; 46 Dan Petry; 19 Dave Rozema; 17 Bill Scherrer; 39 Milt Wilcox; 28 Carl Willis | Catchers: 8 Marty Castillo; 25 Dwight Lowry; 13 Lance Parrish; Infielders: 9 Doug Baker; 14 Dave Bergman; 16 Tom Brookens; 24 Scott Earl; 27 Bárbaro Garbey; 20 Howard Johnson; 4 Mike Laga; 3 Alan Trammell; 1 Lou Whitaker | Outfielders: 23 Kirk Gibson; 30 Johnny Grubb; 31 Larry Herndon; 32 Ruppert Jones; 15 Rusty Kuntz; 34 Chet Lemon; 37 Nelson Simmons; Other batters: 12 Rod Allen; 41 Darrell Evans | Manager: 11 Sparky Anderson; Coaches: 26 Gates Brown; 50 Billy Consolo; 38 Roger Craig; 51 Alex Grammas; 53 Dick Tracewski |

=== Season summary ===
The Tigers began the year with an unprecedented start of 35–5. For the rest of the season, the team went 69–53 (a .564 winning percentage, which is the pace of a 91 win season). There was a stretch in late July and August where the team lost 12 out of 18. The Tigers finished with a 104–58 record, 15 games ahead of the second place Toronto Blue Jays. They outscored their opponents 829–643.

The 1984 Tigers' 104 wins is a franchise record and their .642 winning percentage ranks as the 4th best in team history, as follows:

Best Seasons in Detroit Tigers History
| Rank | Year | Wins | Losses | Win % | Finish |
| 1 | 1934 | 101 | 53 | .656 | Lost 1934 World Series to Cardinals |
| 2 | 1915 | 100 | 54 | .649 | 2nd in AL behind Red Sox |
| 3 | 1909 | 98 | 54 | .645 | Lost 1909 World Series to Pirates |
| 4 | 1984 | 104 | 58 | .642 | Won 1984 World Series over Padres |
| 5 | 1968 | 103 | 59 | .636 | Won 1968 World Series over Cardinals |

=== Season highlights ===
- December 17, 1983: Darrell Evans is signed as a free agent by the Detroit Tigers.
- March 24: Willie Hernández is traded by the Phillies to the Tigers with Dave Bergman for John Wockenfuss and Glenn Wilson.
- March 24, 1984: Former University of Michigan Wolverines football star Rick Leach is released by the Tigers.
- April 3: The Tigers beat the Twins, 8–1, on Opening Day in Minneapolis. Jack Morris pitches 7 innings with Aurelio López and Willie Hernández each pitching a scoreless inning in relief. Darrell Evans hits a home run and has 3 RBIs.
- April 5: The Tigers beat the Twins again, 7–3. Dan Petry gets the win. Alan Trammell goes 4-for-5 and scores 2 runs. Kirk Gibson hits a 3-run home run.
- April 7: Jack Morris pitches a no-hitter on NBC's first nationally broadcast Saturday game. Morris walks 6 and pitches his way out of a bases-loaded jam in the 4th inning.
- April 8: The Tigers win their 5th straight, 7–3, beating Tom Seaver in his American League debut with the White Sox. Kirk Gibson hits a home run into the upper deck, and Bárbaro Garbey drives in 3 runs.
- April 10: Opening Day in Detroit. Dan Petry pitches a 4-hitter, and Darrell Evans hits a 3-run home run. The Tigers beat the Rangers, 5–1.
- April 12: Jack Morris gets his 3rd win, as the Tigers beat the Rangers, 9–4. The Tigers set a franchise record by opening the season with 7 straight wins.
- April 13: The Tigers score 8 runs in the 1st inning at Fenway Park, defeating the Red Sox, 13–9. The Tigers tie a record by turning 6 double plays. Lance Parrish makes all 3 outs in the 8-run 1st inning, striking out and later grounding into a double play.
- April 17: After two straight rainouts in Boston, the game in Detroit is postponed due to snow.
- April 18: Jack Morris pitches 9 innings, but the game goes into extra innings. Willie Hernández gets the win, 4–3, over the Royals. The Tigers are 9–0 to start the season.
- April 19: The Tigers fail to tie the AL record of 10 straight to open a season. Bret Saberhagen of the Royals beats them, 5–2.
- April 22: The Tigers complete a 3-game sweep of the White Sox in Detroit. The Tigers win, 9–1, after a 90-minute snow delay.
- April 24: The Tigers score 3 runs in the 9th inning to beat the Twins‚ 6–5. The rally gives Jack Morris his 11th straight win over Minnesota.
- April 25: The Tigers beat the Rangers, 9–4, as Lance Parrish, Howard Johnson and Johnny Grubb hit home runs.
- April 26: The Tigers win again to extend their record to 16–1.
- April 27: The Indians give the Tigers' their second loss of the season, but it took 19 innings. Kirk Gibson drops a fly ball in the 19th inning, and the Indians score 4. The game ends at 1:19 a.m.
- April 28: Jack Morris puts the Tigers back on track with his 5th win. Morris throws a complete game, and the Tigers beat the Indians, 6–2.
- April 29: Dan Petry pitches 8 scoreless innings, and the Tigers beat the Indians, 6–1. Alan Trammell hits a double to extend his hitting streak to 17 games. The Tigers finish the month of April with a record of 18–2.
- May 1: Milt Wilcox gets the win, as the Tigers clobber the Red Sox, 11–2. Chet Lemon goes 3-for-4 with 2 home runs. Trammell gets 2 hits to extend his hitting streak to 18 games.
- May 3: The Tigers lose their second straight game to the Red Sox. Despite a 5-hitter by Jack Morris, the Tigers are shut out, 1–0.
- May 6: The Tigers complete a 3-game sweep of the Indians with a 12-inning victory.
- May 8: Jack Morris pitches a complete game for his 6th victory of the year. Tigers beat the Royals, 5–2. Alan Trammell hits a grand slam off Dan Quisenberry in the 7th inning.
- May 11: The Tigers (26–4) break the Dodgers' record (25–5) for the best record after 30 games. Milt Wilcox gets the win, as the Tigers beat the Angels in front of 44,187 fans in Detroit.
- May 12: Reggie Jackson hits a home run over the right field roof at Tiger Stadium. Sparky Anderson is thrown out of the game in the 9th inning after the umpire calls a double play when Larry Herndon slides out of the basepath to take out the Angels' shortstop. The Tigers lose for the 5th time in 1984.
- May 16: Alan Trammell hits a triple, and the Tigers score 5 runs in the 1st inning. The Tigers beat the Mariners, 10–1.
- May 17: Sparky Anderson's father dies, and he flies to California. Dick Tracewski is appointed interim manager.
- May 19: Jack Morris pitches into the 8th inning and wins his 8th game. Lou Whitaker hits a home run.
- May 22: Sparky Anderson rejoins the team as they beat the Angels in Anaheim.
- May 24: The Tigers complete a sweep of the Angels in California, as Jack Morris pitches a four-hitter. Morris is 9–1, and the team is 35–5 (.875). They have also won 17 straight on the road—tying the MLB record.
- May 27: The streak is officially over, as the Mariners complete a 3-game sweep over the Tigers in the Kingdome; Detroit's record falls to 35–8.
- May 28: Once again, Jack Morris puts the team back on track. He pitches a complete game and wins his 10th game on Memorial Day in Oakland. Alan Trammell is 3-for-4, and Lance Parrish hits his 8th home run.
- May 30: The Tigers beat the A's, 2–1, on a 9th-inning home run by Kirk Gibson. Willie Hernández gets the win.
- June 1: The Tigers score a season–high 14 runs in front of 47,252 fans in Detroit to beat the Orioles, 14–2. Dan Petry gets the win, as Alan Trammell, Chet Lemon, and Lance Parrish all hit home runs.
- June 4: The Tigers beat the Blue Jays, 6–3. Howard Johnson hits a 3–run home run in the 7th inning to tie the score. In the 11th inning, Dave Bergman comes to bat with 2 men on base and 2 outs. Bergman fouls off 7 pitches, and on a full count hits the 13th pitch into the upper deck at Tiger Stadium for a walk-off, 3-run home run. In his book Bless You Boys, Sparky Anderson wrote: "Tonight I saw the greatest at bat in my life ... Bergie fouled off seven pitches and then picked one practically off the ground and drilled it into the upper deck in right. What a battle! Bergie was up there a full seven minutes."
- June 10: The Tigers sweep the Orioles in a doubleheader. Lou Whitaker scores 5 runs in the opener.
- June 15: Dan Petry wins his 10th game, a 3–2 victory over the Brewers. Just 61 games into the season, Petry has 10 wins, and Morris has 11.
- June 20: Howard Johnson hits a 3-run home run in the 13th inning, as the Tigers top the Yankees, 9–6.
- June 24: After missing two starts‚ Jack Morris (12–3) beats the Brewers‚ 7–1. Ruppert Jones and Lance Parrish hit home runs for the Tigers‚ who draw 165‚000 fans for a 4-game series with Milwaukee.
- July 5: Trailing 4–1 with 2 outs in the 9th inning‚ the Tigers score 6 runs to beat the Rangers‚ 7–4. Lou Whitaker hits a single with the bases loaded, and Kirk Gibson seals it with a 3-run blast down the right-field line.
- July 13: The Tigers go into extra innings when Kirk Gibson throws out a Twins runner at home in the 9th inning. The Tigers win, 5–3, as Lou Whitaker hits an inside-the-park home run.
- August 7: The Tigers split a doubleheader with Boston. In the 2nd game, Lance Parrish hits a 2-run home run in the 11th to win it. Aurelio López gets the win to extend his record to 9–0.
- August 17: The Tigers beat the Mariners, 6–2, and the Tigers' season attendance reaches 2,031,847—passing the franchise record set by the 1968 team.
- August 18: Kirk Gibson drives in 3 runs and hits his 20th home run to become the first Tiger to reach 20 home runs and 20 stolen bases. Juan Berenguer strikes out 12.
- August 20: The Tigers crush the A's, 14–1. Jack Morris gives up 3 hits in 7 innings for his 16th win. Lance Parrish, Chet Lemon and Darrell Evans hit home runs.
- August 26: The Tigers beat Tommy John and the Angels, 12–6. Marty Castillo hits a home run and scores 3 runs. Chet Lemon hits a grand slam, and Kirk Gibson hits two home runs.
- September 6: The Tigers beat the Orioles, 1–0, as the Tigers score the game's only run on a fielding error by Cal Ripken Jr.
- September 7: The Tigers beat the Blue Jays, 7–4, coming back from a 4–0 deficit in the 8th inning. Dave Bergman wins it with a 3-run home run in the 10th inning.
- September 11: The Tigers beat the Orioles, 9–2. Darrell Evans has 4 hits. Evans and Larry Herndon hit back-to-back home runs. Kirk Gibson has 3 hits and steals his 27th base.
- September 18: The Tigers clinch the AL East with a 3–0 win over the Brewers. They are the 4th team in the 20th Century to remain in first place from wire-to-wire, joining the 1927 Yankees‚ and the 1955 Dodgers. The 1990 Cincinnati Reds would later join that list.
- September 23: The Tigers win their 100th game, a 4–1 victory over the Yankees. Jack Morris pitches 6 scoreless innings for his 19th win. Marty Castillo goes 2-for-3, including a game-winning home run in the 7th inning.
- September 29: The Tigers beat the Yankees, 11–3, for their 104th win – a franchise record. Larry Herndon, Lance Parrish, and Dwight Lowry hit home runs, and Roger Mason pitches 3 innings of relief for the save.

== Game log ==
=== Regular season ===
1984 regular season game log: 104–58 (Home: 53–29; Away: 51–29)
April: 18–2 (Home: 10–2; Away: 8–0)

| # | Date | Time (ET) | Opponent | Score | Win | Loss | Save | Time of Game | Attendance | Record | Box/ Streak |
|---|---|---|---|---|---|---|---|---|---|---|---|
| 1 | April 3 | 8:35 p.m. EST | @ Twins | 8–1 | **Morris** (1–0) | Williams (0–1) | – | 2:10 | 34,381 | 1–0 | W1 |
| 2 | April 5 | 1:15 p.m. EST | @ Twins | 7–3 | **Petry** (1–0) | Viola (0–1) | – | 2:33 | 8,373 | 2–0 | W2 |
| 3 | April 6 | 2:30 p.m. EST | @ White Sox | 3–2 | **Wilcox** (1–0) | Dotson (0–1) | **Hernández** (1) | 2:51 | 42,692 | 3–0 | W3 |
| 4 | April 7 | 1:50 p.m. EST | @ White Sox | 4–0 | **Morris** (2–0) | Bannister (0–1) | – | 2:44 | 24,616 | 4–0 | W4 |
| 5 | April 8 | 2:30 p.m. EST | @ White Sox | 7–3 | **López** (1–0) | Seaver (0–1) | – | 3:17 | 20,478 | 5–0 | W5 |
| 6 | April 10 | 1:30 p.m. EST | Rangers | 5–1 | **Petry** (2–0) | Stewart (0–2) | – | 2:32 | 51,238 | 6–0 | W6 |
| 7 | April 12 | 1:30 p.m. EST | Rangers | 9–4 | **Morris** (3–0) | Tanana (0–1) | – | 2:48 | 19,154 | 7–0 | W7 |
| 8 | April 13 | 2:05 p.m. EST | @ Red Sox | 13–9 | **Bair** (1–0) | Hurst (1–2) | – | 3:11 | 35,179 | 8–0 | W8 |
| — | April 15 | | @ Red Sox | **Postponed (Rain)** (Makeup date: August 6) | | | | | | | |
| — | April 16 | | @ Red Sox | **Postponed (Rain)** (Makeup date: August 7) | | | | | | | |
| — | April 17 | | Royals | **Postponed (Rain)** (Makeup date: April 19) | | | | | | | |
| 9 | April 18 | 7:35 p.m. EDT | Royals | **W** 4–3 (10) | **Hernández** (1–0) | Beckwith (0–1) | — | 3:02 | 12,310 | 9–0 | W9 |
| 10 | April 19 | 1:30 p.m. EST | Royals | L 2–5 | Saberhagen (1–0) | **Petry** (2–1) | Quisenberry (5) | 2:27 | 12,100 | 9–1 | L1 |
| 11 | April 20 | 7:35 p.m. EDT | White Sox | 3–2 | **López** (2–0) | Reed (0–1) | – | 2:36 | 33,554 | 10–1 | W1 |
| 12 | April 21 | 2:15 p.m. EDT | White Sox | 4–1 | **Rozema** (1–0) | Hoyt (2–1) | **Bair** (1) | 2:35 | 34,395 | 11–1 | W2 |
| 13 | April 22 | 1:30 p.m. EST | White Sox | 9–1 | **Berenguer** (1–0) | Brennan (0–1) | – | 2:58 | 10,603 | 12–1 | W3 |
| — | April 23 | | Twins | **Postponed (Rain)** (Makeup date: April 24) | | | | | | | |
| 14 | April 24 | 5:30 p.m. EST | Twins | 6–5 | **Morris** (4–0) | Davis (2–2) | – | 2:16 | N/A | 13–1 | W4 |
| 15 | April 24 | 8:21 p.m. EST | Twins | 4–3 | **Abbott** (1–0) | Viola (0–3) | **López** (1) | 2:29 | 20,315 | 14–1 | W5 |
| 16 | April 25 | 8:35 p.m. EST | @ Rangers | 9–4 | **Wilcox** (2–0) | Stewart (0–5) | **Hernández** (2) | 2:38 | 25,883 | 15–1 | W6 |
| 17 | April 26 | 8:35 p.m. EST | @ Rangers | 7–5 | **Bair** (2–0) | Tanana (2–2) | **López** (2) | 2:50 | 13,559 | 16–1 | W7 |
| 18 | April 27 | 7:35 p.m. EDT | Indians | 4–8 (19) | Aponte (1–0) | **Abbott** (1–1) | – | 5:44 | 34,112 | 16–2 | L1 |
| 19 | April 28 | 2:15 p.m. EST | Indians | 6–2 | **Morris** (5–0) | Behenna (0–1) | – | 2:25 | 28,253 | 17–2 | W1 |
| 20 | April 29 | 1:30 p.m. EDT | Indians | 6–1 | **Petry** (3–1) | Spillner (0–1) | – | 2:20 | 24,853 | 18–2 | W2 |

May: 19–7 (Home: 8–3; Away: 11–4)

| # | Date | Time (ET) | Opponent | Score | Win | Loss | Save | Time of Game | Attendance | Record | Box/ Streak |
|---|---|---|---|---|---|---|---|---|---|---|---|
| 21 | May 1 | 7:35 p.m. EDT | Red Sox | 11–2 | **Wilcox** (3–0) | Hurst (3–3) | – | 2:31 | 17,495 | 19–2 | W3 |
| 22 | May 2 | 7:35 p.m. EDT | Red Sox | 4–5 | Brown (1–2) | **Berenguer** (1–1) | Stanley (4) | 2:33 | 23,085 | 19–3 | L1 |
| 23 | May 3 | 1:30 p.m. EDT | Red Sox | 0–1 | Ojeda (2–2) | **Morris** (5–1) | – | 2:18 | 22,617 | 19–4 | L2 |
| 24 | May 4 | 7:05 p.m. EDT | @ Indians | 9–2 | **Petry** (4–1) | Spillner (0–2) | **Hernández** (3) | 3:06 | 8,497 | 20–4 | W1 |
| 25 | May 5 | 1:35 p.m. EDT | @ Indians | 6–5 | **Abbott** (2–1) | Heaton (2–3) | **López** (3) | 2:57 | 9,282 | 21–4 | W2 |
| 26 | May 6 | 1:35 p.m. EDT | @ Indians | 6–5 (12) | **López** (3–0) | Camacho (0–2) | – | 4:20 | 16,125 | 22–4 | W3 |
| 27 | May 7 | 8:35 p.m. EDT | @ Royals | **W** 10–3 | **Berenguer** (2–1) | Gubicza (0–3) | **Bair** (2) | 3:02 | 19,474 | 23–4 | W4 |
| 28 | May 8 | 8:35 p.m. EDT | @ Royals | **W** 5–2 | **Morris** (6–1) | Black (3–2) | — | 2:35 | 14,304 | 24–4 | W5 |
| 29 | May 9 | 8:35 p.m. EDT | @ Royals | **W** 3–1 | **Petry** (5–1) | Jackson (0–4) | **López** (4) | 2:48 | 15,709 | 25–4 | W6 |
| 30 | May 11 | 7:35 p.m. EDT | Angels | **W** 8–2 | **Wilcox** (4–0) | Witt (4–2) | **Hernández** (4) | 2:55 | 44,187 | 26–4 | W7 |
| 31 | May 12 | 1:20 p.m. EDT | Angels | L 2–4 | John (3–2) | **Berenguer** (2–2) | – | 2:32 | 38,516 | 26–5 | L1 |
| — | May 13 | | Angels | **Postponed (Rain)** (Makeup date: August 14) | | | | | | | |
| 32 | May 14 | | Mariners | 7–5 | Lopez | Vande Berg | – | 3:05 | 18,830 | 27–5 | W1 |
| 33 | May 15 | | Mariners | 6–4 | Morris | Thomas | Hernandez | 3:32 | 21,782 | 28–5 | W2 |
| 34 | May 16 | | Mariners | 10–1 | Wilcox | Young | – | 2:52 | 22,001 | 29–5 | W3 |
| 35 | May 18 | | Athletics | 8–4 (6) | Petry | Krueger | | | 41,136 | 30–5 | |
| 36 | May 19 | | Athletics | 5–4 | Morris | McCatty | Lopez | | 42,906 | 31–5 | |
| 37 | May 20 | | Athletics | 4–3 | Wilcox | Sorensen | Hernandez | | 27,073 | 32–5 | |
| 38 | May 22 | 10:30 p.m. EDT | @ Angels | **W** 3–1 | **Berenguer** (3–2) | Witt (4–4) | **López** (6) | 2:53 | 41,253 | 33–5 | W7 |
| 39 | May 23 | 10:30 p.m. EDT | @ Angels | **W** 4–2 | **Petry** (7–1) | LaCorte (0–2) | **Hernández** (7) | 2:39 | 41,205 | 34–5 | W8 |
| 40 | May 24 | 10:30 p.m. EDT | @ Angels | **W** 5–1 | **Morris** (9–1) | Slaton (1–2) | – | 2:14 | 43,580 | 35–5 | W9 |
| 41 | May 25 | | @ Mariners | 3–7 | Vande Berg | Wilcox | Mirabella | 2:54 | 15,722 | 35–6 | L1 |
| 42 | May 26 | | @ Mariners | 5–9 | Moore | Berenguer | – | 2:51 | 41,342 | 35–7 | L2 |
| 43 | May 27 | | @ Mariners | 1–6 | Young | Petry | – | 2:50 | 12,755 | 35–8 | L3 |
| 44 | May 28 | | @ Athletics | 6–2 | Morris | Codiroli | | | 46,238 | 36–8 | |
| 45 | May 29 | | @ Athletics | 5–8 | Krueger | Wilcox | Caudill | | 22,499 | 36–9 | |
| 46 | May 30 | | @ Athletics | 2–1 | Hernandez | McCatty | Lopez | | 15,224 | 37–9 | |

June: 18–12 (Home: 10–7; Away: 8–5)

| # | Date | Time (ET) | Opponent | Score | Win | Loss | Save | Time of Game | Attendance | Record | Box/ Streak |
|---|---|---|---|---|---|---|---|---|---|---|---|
| 47 | June 1 | | Orioles | 14–2 | Petry | McGregor | Bair | | 47,252 | 38–9 | |
| 48 | June 2 | | Orioles | 0–5 | Davis | Morris | | | 40,292 | 38–10 | |
| 49 | June 3 | | Orioles | 1–2 | Flanagan | Wilcox | | | 34,228 | 38–11 | |
| 50 | June 4 | | Blue Jays | **W** 6–3 (10) | Lopez | Key | | | 26,733 | 39–11 | W1 |
| 51 | June 5 | | Blue Jays | L 4–8 | Acker | Abbott | | | 35,983 | 39–12 | L1 |
| 52 | June 6 | | Blue Jays | L 3–6 | Leal | Petry | | | 38,167 | 39–13 | L2 |
| 53 | June 7 | | Blue Jays | **W** 5–3 | Morris | Clancy | | | 40,879 | 40–13 | W1 |
| 54 | June 8 | | @ Orioles | 3–2 | Wilcox | Davis | Hernandez | | 50,361 | 41–13 | |
| 55 | June 9 | | @ Orioles | 0–4 | Flanagan | Berenguer | | | 44,404 | 41–14 | |
| — | June 9 | | @ Orioles | **Postponed (Schedule change)** (Makeup date: June 10) | | | | | | | |
| 56 | June 10 | | @ Orioles | 10–4 | Bair | Boddicker | Hernandez | | N/A | 42–14 | |
| 57 | June 10 | | @ Orioles | 8–0 | Petry | Martinez | | | 51,764 | 43–14 | |
| 58 | June 11 | | @ Blue Jays | **W** 5–4 | Rozema | Leal | Hernandez | | 35,062 | 44–14 | W3 |
| 59 | June 12 | | @ Blue Jays | L 3–12 | Clancy | Morris | | | 40,437 | 44–15 | L1 |
| 60 | June 13 | | @ Blue Jays | L 3–7 | Stieb | Wilcox | | | 34,122 | 44–16 | L2 |
| 61 | June 15 | | @ Brewers | 3–2 | Petry | Cocanower | Hernandez | | 32,074 | 45–16 | |
| 62 | June 16 | | @ Brewers | 6–0 | Berenguer | Sutton | | | 50,395 | 46–16 | |
| 63 | June 17 | | @ Brewers | 7–4 | Rozema | McClure | Lopez | | 44,902 | 47–16 | |
| 64 | June 18 | | Yankees | 1–2 | Niekro | Wilcox | Rijo | | 40,315 | 47–17 | |
| 65 | June 19 | | Yankees | 7–6 | Lopez | Guidry | Hernandez | | 41,192 | 48–17 | |
| 66 | June 20 | | Yankees | 9–6 (13) | Bair | Rijo | | | 43,972 | 49–17 | |
| 67 | June 21 | | Brewers | 3–4 | Sutton | Berenguer | Fingers | | 32,291 | 49–18 | |
| 68 | June 22 | | Brewers | 7–3 | Rozema | McClure | Hernandez | | 48,497 | 50–18 | |
| 69 | June 23 | | Brewers | 5–1 | Wilcox | Porter | | | 44,680 | 51–18 | |
| 70 | June 24 | | Brewers | 7–1 | Morris | Haas | Lopez | | 39,067 | 52–18 | |
| 71 | June 25 | | @ Yankees | 3–7 | Guidry | Bair | Howell | | 29,237 | 52–19 | |
| 72 | June 26 | | @ Yankees | 9–7 (10) | Hernandez | Christiansen | | | 32,301 | 53–19 | |
| 73 | June 27 | | @ Yankees | 4–5 | Howell | Willis | | | 30,428 | 53–20 | |
| 74 | June 29 | 5:35 p.m. EDT | Twins | 3–5 | Williams (3–3) | **Morris** (12–4) | Davis (15) | 2:50 | N/A | 53–21 | L2 |
| 75 | June 29 | 9:00 p.m. EDT | Twins | 7–5 | **Hernández** (4–0) | Filson (4–2) | – | 3:00 | 44,619 | 54–21 | W1 |
| 76 | June 30 | 7:35 p.m. EDT | Twins | 4–3 | **Petry** (11–3) | Schrom (1–3) | **Hernández** (14) | 2:43 | 48,095 | 55–21 | W2 |

July: 16–12 (Home: 9–5; Away: 7–7)

| # | Date | Time (ET) | Opponent | Score | Win | Loss | Save | Time of Game | Attendance | Record | Box/ Streak |
|---|---|---|---|---|---|---|---|---|---|---|---|
| 77 | July 1 | 1:30 p.m. EDT | Twins | 0–9 | Viola (8–7) | **Berenguer** (4–6) | – | 2:21 | 43,484 | 55–22 | L1 |
| 78 | July 2 | 8:20 p.m. CDT | @ White Sox | 1–7 | Bannister (5–6) | **Rozema** (4–1) | – | 2:29 | 32,768 | 55–23 | L2 |
| 79 | July 3 | 8:30 p.m. EDT | @ White Sox | 5–9 | Seaver (7–6) | **Morris** (12–5) | Reed (4) | 2:42 | 43,094 | 55–24 | L3 |
| 80 | July 4 | 7:05 p.m. EDT | @ White Sox | 2–8 | Dotson (11–4) | **Wilcox** (8–6) | – | 2:34 | 37,665 | 55–25 | L4 |
| 81 | July 5 | 8:35 p.m. EDT | @ Rangers | 7–4 | **López** (7–0) | Hough (8–7) | **Hernández** (15) | 2:26 | 15,151 | 56–25 | W1 |
| 82 | July 6 | 8:35 p.m. EDT | @ Rangers | 3–5 | Mason (6–6) | **Berenguer** (4–7) | Schmidt (4) | 2:42 | 22,378 | 56–26 | L1 |
| 83 | July 7 | 8:35 p.m. EDT | @ Rangers | 5–2 | **Rozema** (5–1) | Darwin (5–5) | **Hernández** (16) | 2:41 | 29,262 | 57–26 | W1 |
| 84 | July 8 | 8:35 p.m. EDT | @ Rangers | 7–9 | Tanana (9–8) | **Bair** (4–2) | Schmidt (5) | 2:37 | 16,010 | 57–27 | L1 |
**55th All-Star Game in San Francisco, CA**
| 85 | July 12 | 8:35 p.m. EDT | @ Twins | 2–4 | Viola (10–7) | **Petry** (11–4) | Davis (17) | 2:18 | 29,729 | 57–28 | L2 |
| 86 | July 13 | 8:35 p.m. EDT | @ Twins | 5–3 (11) | **Hernández** (5–0) | Lysander (0–1) | **López** (10) | 3:11 | 30,050 | 58–28 | W1 |
| 87 | July 14 | 8:35 p.m. EDT | @ Twins | 6–5 (12) | **Hernández** (6–0) | Walters (0–3) | – | 3:40 | 46,017 | 59–28 | W2 |
| 88 | July 15 | 2:15 p.m. EDT | @ Twins | 6–2 | **Rozema** (6–1) | Schrom (2–4) | **López** (11) | 3:00 | 27,965 | 60–28 | W3 |
| 89 | July 16 | 7:35 p.m. EDT | White Sox | 7–1 | **Abbott** (3–2) | Hoyt (8–10) | – | 2:29 | 41,935 | 61–28 | W4 |
| 90 | July 17 | 7:35 p.m. EDT | White Sox | 3–2 | **Petry** (12–4) | Nelson (1–2) | **Hernández** (17) | 2:03 | 34,579 | 62–28 | W5 |
| 91 | July 18 | 7:35 p.m. EDT | White Sox | 6–10 | Bannister (7–6) | **Morris** (12–6) | Agosto (3) | 2:59 | 39,051 | 62–29 | L1 |
| 92 | July 19 | 7:35 p.m. EDT | Rangers | 9–2 | **Wilcox** (9–6) | Stewart (4–11) | – | 2:32 | 26,908 | 63–29 | W1 |
| 93 | July 20 | 7:35 p.m. EDT | Rangers | 3–1 | **Rozema** (7–1) | Tanana (9–9) | **Hernández** (18) | 2:16 | 39,484 | 64–29 | W2 |
| 94 | July 21 | 7:35 p.m. EDT | Rangers | 7–6 | **Monge** (1–0) | Noles (1–1) | **Hernández** (19) | 2:38 | 46,219 | 65–29 | W3 |
| 95 | July 22 | 1:30 p.m. EDT | Rangers | 2–0 | **Petry** (13–4) | Hough (10–8) | **Hernández** (20) | 2:11 | 37,846 | 66–29 | W4 |
| 96 | July 23 | 7:05 p.m. EDT | @ Indians | 4–1 | **Morris** (13–6) | Blyleven (9–4) | **Bair** (4) | 3:09 | 16,576 | 67–29 | W5 |
| 97 | July 24 | 7:05 p.m. EDT | @ Indians | 9–5 | **Wilcox** (10–6) | Farr (1–7) | – | 3:21 | 15,578 | 68–29 | W6 |
| 98 | July 25 | 7:05 p.m. EDT | @ Indians | 1–4 | Smith (4–2) | **Rozema** (7–2) | Camacho (12) | 2:48 | 15,516 | 68–30 | L1 |
| — | July 26 | | @ Indians | **Postponed (Rain; Site change)** (Makeup date: July 31) | | | | | | | |
| 99 | July 27 | 5:30 p.m. EDT | Red Sox | 9–1 | **Petry** (14–4) | Hurst (10–6) | – | 2:30 | N/A | 69–30 | W1 |
| 100 | July 27 | 8:35 p.m. EDT | Red Sox | 0–4 | Ojeda (9–7) | **Abbott** (3–3) | – | 2:22 | 49,607 | 69–31 | L1 |
| 101 | July 28 | 7:35 p.m. EDT | Red Sox | 2–3 | Stanley (7–6) | **Morris** (13–7) | Clear (3) | 2:58 | 49,372 | 69–32 | L2 |
| 102 | July 29 | 1:30 p.m. EDT | Red Sox | 3–0 | **Wilcox** (11–6) | Boyd (5–8) | **Hernández** (21) | 2:09 | 42,013 | 70–32 | W1 |
| 103 | July 31 | 5:35 p.m. EDT | Indians | 5–1 | **Berenguer** (5–7) | Smith (4–3) | – | 2:30 | N/A | 71–32 | W2 |
| 104 | July 31 | 8:40 p.m. EDT | Indians | 4–6 | Heaton (8–10) | **Rozema** (7–3) | Waddell (5) | 2:50 | 32,158 | 71–33 | L1 |

August: 16–15 (Home: 8–8; Away: 8–7)

| # | Date | Time (ET) | Opponent | Score | Win | Loss | Save | Time of Game | Attendance | Record | Box/ Streak |
|---|---|---|---|---|---|---|---|---|---|---|---|
| 105 | August 1 | 7:35 p.m. EDT | Indians | 2–4 | Farr (2–7) | **Petry** (14–5) | Camacho (13) | 2:46 | 27,271 | 71–34 | L2 |
| 106 | August 2 | 1:30 p.m. EDT | Indians | 2–1 | **Morris** (14–7) | Blyleven (10–5) | **Hernández** (22) | 2:39 | 28,700 | 72–34 | W1 |
| 107 | August 3 | 7:35 p.m. EDT | Royals | L 6–9 | Saberhagen (5–8) | **Wilcox** (11–7) | Quisenberry (28) | 2:37 | 39,480 | 72–35 | L1 |
| 108 | August 4 | 2:15 p.m. EDT | Royals | L 5–9 | Beckwith (4–2) | **Bair** (4–3) | — | 2:57 | 41,714 | 72–36 | L2 |
| 109 | August 5 (1) | 1:30 p.m. EDT | Royals | L 4–5 | Saberhagen (6–8) | **Hernández** (6–1) | Quisenberry (29) | 2:57 | N/A | 72–37 | L3 |
| 110 | August 5 (2) | 5:02 p.m. EDT | Royals | L 0–4 | Leibrandt (6–4) | **Berenguer** (5–8) | — | 2:37 | 42,761 | 72–38 | L4 |
| 111 | August 6 | 5:35 p.m. EDT | @ Red Sox | 9–7 | **López** (8–0) | Ojeda (9–9) | **Hernández** (23) | 3:17 | N/A | 73–38 | W1 |
| 112 | August 6 | 9:27 p.m. EDT | @ Red Sox | 2–10 | Clemens (6–4) | **Willis** (0–2) | – | 2:55 | 31,055 | 73–39 | L1 |
| 113 | August 7 | 5:35 p.m. EDT | @ Red Sox | 7–12 | Hurst (11–6) | **Morris** (14–8) | Clear (5) | 2:49 | N/A | 73–40 | L2 |
| 114 | August 7 | 8:59 p.m. EDT | @ Red Sox | 7–5 (11) | **López** (9–0) | Gale (1–3) | **Hernández** (24) | 3:33 | 32,120 | 74–40 | W1 |
| 115 | August 8 | 7:35 p.m. EDT | @ Red Sox | 0–8 | Boyd (7–8) | **Abbott** (3–4) | – | 2:28 | 32,563 | 74–41 | L1 |
| 116 | August 10 | 8:35 p.m. EDT | @ Royals | **W** 5–4 | **López** (10–0) | Beckwith (5–3) | **Hernández** (25) | 2:59 | 32,181 | 75–41 | W1 |
| 117 | August 11 | 8:35 p.m. EDT | @ Royals | **W** 9–5 | **Morris** (15–8) | Leibrandt (6–5) | **López** (12) | 2:42 | 40,501 | 76–41 | W2 |
| 118 | August 12 | 2:35 p.m. EDT | @ Royals | **W** 8–4 | **Wilcox** (12–7) | Saberhagen (6–9) | — | 2:47 | 32,753 | 77–41 | W3 |
| 119 | August 14 (1) | 5:35 p.m. EDT | Angels | L 4–6 | Aase (2–1) | **Hernández** (6–2) | Sánchez (11) | 2:53 | N/A | 77–42 | L1 |
| 120 | August 14 (2) | 9:03 p.m. EDT | Angels | L 1–12 | Kison (3–1) | **Rozema** (7–4) | – | 2:33 | 38,597 | 77–43 | L2 |
| 121 | August 15 | 7:35 p.m. EDT | Angels | **W** 8–3 | **Petry** (15–5) | John (7–10) | – | 2:46 | 33,940 | 78–43 | W1 |
| 122 | August 16 | 1:30 p.m. EDT | Angels | **W** 8–7 (12) | **Hernández** (7–2) | Curtis (0–1) | – | 4:02 | 37,779 | 79–43 | W2 |
| 123 | August 17 | | Mariners | 6–2 | Wilcox | Moore | – | 3:08 | 36,496 | 80–43 | W3 |
| 124 | August 18 | | Mariners | 4–3 | Berenguer | Geisel | Hernandez | 2:41 | 36,719 | 81–43 | W4 |
| 125 | August 19 | | Mariners | 1–4 | Langston | Petry | Vande Berg | 2:51 | 43,277 | 81–44 | L1 |
| 126 | August 20 | | Athletics | 14–1 | Morris | Young | | | 38,431 | 82–44 | |
| 127 | August 21 | | Athletics | 12–6 | Wilcox | Sorensen | | | 34,065 | 83–44 | |
| 128 | August 22 | | Athletics | 11–4 | Berenguer | Krueger | | | 35,335 | 84–44 | |
| 129 | August 24 | 10:30 p.m. EDT | @ Angels | L 3–5 | Witt (12–10) | **Petry** (15–7) | Aase (4) | 2:33 | 41,459 | 84–45 | L1 |
| 130 | August 25 | 10:00 p.m. EDT | @ Angels | **W** 5–1 | **Morris** (17–8) | Kison (3–3) | – | 2:40 | 51,203 | 85–45 | W1 |
| 131 | August 26 | 4:00 p.m. EDT | @ Angels | **W** 12–6 | **Wilcox** (15–7) | John (7–12) | – | 3:01 | 33,008 | 86–45 | W2 |
| 132 | August 28 | | @ Mariners | 5–4 | Hernandez | Stanton | – | 2:51 | 8,353 | 87–45 | W3 |
| 133 | August 29 | | @ Mariners | 1–5 | Langston | Petry | – | 2:11 | 10,863 | 87–46 | L1 |
| 134 | August 30 | | @ Mariners | 1–2 | Beattie | Morris | Nunez | 2:34 | 9,583 | 87–47 | L2 |
| 135 | August 31 | | @ Athletics | 6–7 (13) | Atherton | Rozema | | | 15,836 | 87–48 | |

September: 17–10 (Home: 8–4; Away: 9–6)

| # | Date | Time (ET) | Opponent | Score | Win | Loss | Save | Time of Game | Attendance | Record | Box/ Streak |
|---|---|---|---|---|---|---|---|---|---|---|---|
| 136 | September 1 | | @ Athletics | 5–7 | Young | Berenguer | Rainey | | 25,021 | 87–49 | |
| 137 | September 2 | | @ Athletics | 6–3 | Petry | Conroy | Hernandez | | 20,393 | 88–49 | |
| 138 | September 3 | | Orioles | 4–7 | Stewart | Morris | | | 36,797 | 88–50 | |
| 139 | September 4 | | Orioles | 1–4 | Boddicker | Rozema | Stewart | | 27,767 | 88–51 | |
| 140 | September 5 | | Orioles | 1–0 | Berenguer | Flanagan | Hernandez | | 34,065 | 89–51 | |
| 141 | September 7 | | @ Blue Jays | **W** 7–4 (10) | Hernandez | Musselman | | | 37,420 | 90–51 | W2 |
| 142 | September 8 | | @ Blue Jays | **W** 10–4 | Scherrer | Leal | Lopez | | 41,059 | 91–51 | W3 |
| 143 | September 9 | | @ Blue Jays | **W** 7–2 | Wilcox | Clancy | | | 37,392 | 92–51 | W4 |
| 144 | September 10 | | @ Orioles | 1–3 | Flanagan | Berenguer | | | 27,440 | 92–52 | |
| 145 | September 11 | | @ Orioles | 9–2 | Petry | Swaggerty | | | 25,193 | 93–52 | |
| 146 | September 12 | | @ Orioles | 1–3 | Martinez | Mason | | | 24,561 | 93–53 | |
| 147 | September 14 | | Blue Jays | L 2–7 | Clancy | Morris | Key | | 46,040 | 93–54 | L2 |
| 148 | September 15 | | Blue Jays | **W** 2–1 | Wilcox | Stieb | Hernandez | | 44,349 | 94–54 | W1 |
| 149 | September 16 | | Blue Jays | **W** 8–3 | Berenguer | Clark | | | 45,488 | 95–54 | W2 |
| 150 | September 17 | | Brewers | 7–3 | Mason | Waits | Lopez | | 34,091 | 96–54 | |
| 151 | September 18 | | Brewers | 3–0 | O'Neal | McClure | Hernandez | | 48,810 | 97–54 | |
| 152 | September 19 | | Brewers | 4–2 | Morris | Candiotti | Hernandez | | 23,056 | 98–54 | |
| 153 | September 21 | | Yankees | 3–5 | Montefusco | Wilcox | Righetti | | 42,238 | 98–55 | |
| 154 | September 22 | | Yankees | 6–0 | Petry | Christiansen | | | 38,897 | 99–55 | |
| 155 | September 23 | | Yankees | 4–1 | Morris | Fontenot | Hernandez | | 39,198 | 100–55 | |
| 156 | September 24 | | @ Brewers | 7–3 | Berenguer | Hartzell | | | 9,506 | 101–55 | |
| 157 | September 25 | | @ Brewers | 9–1 | O'Neal | Gibson | | | 8,804 | 102–55 | |
| 158 | September 26 | | @ Brewers | 5–7 | Searage | Lopez | | | 8,853 | 102–56 | |
| 159 | September 27 | | @ Yankees | 1–2 | Shirley | Hernandez | Righetti | | 16,732 | 102–57 | |
| 160 | September 28 | | @ Yankees | 4–2 (12) | Bair | Cowley | | | 19,422 | 103–57 | |
| 161 | September 29 | | @ Yankees | 11–3 | Berenguer | Guidry | Mason | | 35,685 | 104–57 | |
| 162 | September 30 | | @ Yankees | 2–9 | Rasmussen | O'Neal | | | 30,602 | 104–58 | |

Legend: = Win = Loss = Postponement
Bold = Tigers team member

=== Postseason Game log ===
1984 Postseason game log: 7–1 (Home: 4–0; Away: 3–1)
AL Championship Series: vs. Kansas City Royals 3–0 (Home: 1–0; Away: 2–0)

| # | Date | Time (ET) | Opponent | Score | Win | Loss | Save | Time of Game | Attendance | Series | Box/ Streak |
|---|---|---|---|---|---|---|---|---|---|---|---|
| 1 | October 2 | 8:35 p.m. EDT | @ Royals | **W** 8–1 | **Morris** (1–0) | Black (0–1) | — | 2:42 | 41,973 | 1–0 | W1 |
| 2 | October 3 | 8:25 p.m. EDT | @ Royals | **W** 5–3 (11) | **López** (1–0) | Quisenberry (0–1) | — | 3:37 | 42,019 | 2–0 | W2 |
| 3 | October 5 | 8:25 p.m. EDT | Royals | **W** 1–0 | **Wilcox** (1–0) | Leibrandt (0–1) | **Hernández** (1) | 2:39 | 52,168 | 3–0 | W3 |

World Series: vs. San Diego Padres 4–1 (Home: 3–0; Away: 1–1)

| # | Date | Time (ET) | Opponent | Score | Win | Loss | Save | Time of Game | Attendance | Series | Box/ Streak |
|---|---|---|---|---|---|---|---|---|---|---|---|
| 1 | October 9 | 8:35 p.m. EDT | @ Padres | **W** 3–2 | **Morris** (2–0) | Thurmond (0–2) | — | 3:18 | 57,908 | 1–0 | W1 |
| 2 | October 10 | 8:25 p.m. EDT | @ Padres | L 3–5 | Hawkins (1–0) | **Petry** (0–1) | Lefferts (1) | 2:44 | 57,911 | 1–1 | L1 |
| 3 | October 12 | 8:35 p.m. EDT | Padres | **W** 5–2 | **Wilcox** (2–0) | Lollar (0–1) | **Hernández** (2) | 3:11 | 51,970 | 2–1 | W1 |
| 4 | October 13 | 1:30 p.m. EDT | Padres | **W** 4–2 | **Morris** (3–0) | Show (0–2) | — | 2:20 | 52,130 | 3–1 | W2 |
| 5 | October 14 | 4:45 p.m. EDT | Padres | **W** 8–4 | **López** (2–0) | Hawkins (1–1) | **Hernández** (3) | 2:55 | 51,901 | 4–1 | W3 |

Legend: = Win = Loss = Postponement
Bold = Tigers team member

== Player stats ==
| = Indicates team leader |

=== Batting ===
==== Starters by position ====
Note: Pos = Position; G = Games played; AB = At bats; H = Hits; Avg. = Batting average; HR = Home runs; RBI = Runs batted in

| Pos | Player | G | AB | H | Avg. | HR | RBI |
|---|---|---|---|---|---|---|---|
| C | Lance Parrish | 147 | 578 | 137 | .237 | 33 | 98 |
| 1B | Dave Bergman | 120 | 271 | 74 | .273 | 7 | 44 |
| 2B | Lou Whitaker | 143 | 558 | 161 | .289 | 13 | 56 |
| 3B | Howard Johnson | 116 | 355 | 88 | .248 | 12 | 50 |
| SS | Alan Trammell | 139 | 555 | 174 | .314 | 14 | 69 |
| CF | Chet Lemon | 141 | 509 | 146 | .287 | 20 | 76 |
| RF | Kirk Gibson | 149 | 531 | 150 | .282 | 27 | 91 |
| LF | Larry Herndon | 125 | 407 | 114 | .280 | 7 | 43 |
| DH | Darrell Evans | 98 | 362 | 109 | .232 | 16 | 63 |

==== Other batters ====
Note: G = Games played; AB = At bats; H = Hits; Avg. = Batting average; HR = Home runs; RBI = Runs batted in

| Player | G | AB | H | Avg. | HR | RBI |
|---|---|---|---|---|---|---|
| Bárbaro Garbey | 110 | 327 | 94 | .287 | 5 | 52 |
| Tom Brookens | 113 | 224 | 55 | .246 | 5 | 26 |
| Ruppert Jones | 79 | 215 | 61 | .284 | 12 | 37 |
| Johnny Grubb | 86 | 176 | 47 | .267 | 8 | 17 |
| Marty Castillo | 70 | 141 | 33 | .234 | 4 | 17 |
| Rusty Kuntz | 84 | 140 | 40 | .286 | 2 | 22 |
| Doug Baker | 43 | 108 | 20 | .244 | 2 | 7 |
| Dwight Lowry | 32 | 45 | 11 | .244 | 2 | 7 |
| Scott Earl | 14 | 35 | 4 | .114 | 0 | 1 |
| Nelson Simmons | 9 | 30 | 13 | .433 | 0 | 3 |
| Rod Allen | 15 | 27 | 8 | .296 | 0 | 3 |
| Mike Laga | 9 | 11 | 6 | .545 | 0 | 1 |

=== Pitching ===
| = Indicates league leader |

==== Starting pitchers ====
Note: G = Games; IP = Innings pitched; W = Wins; L = Losses; ERA = Earned run average; SO = Strikeouts

| Player | G | IP | W | L | ERA | SO |
|---|---|---|---|---|---|---|
| Jack Morris | 35 | 240.1 | 19 | 11 | 3.60 | 148 |
| Dan Petry | 35 | 233.1 | 18 | 8 | 3.24 | 144 |
| Milt Wilcox | 33 | 193.2 | 17 | 8 | 4.00 | 119 |
| Juan Berenguer | 31 | 168.1 | 11 | 10 | 3.48 | 118 |
| Dave Rozema | 29 | 101.0 | 7 | 6 | 3.74 | 48 |

==== Other pitchers ====
Note: G = Games pitched; IP = Innings pitched; W = Wins; L = Losses; ERA = Earned run average; SO = Strikeouts

| Player | G | IP | W | L | ERA | SO |
|---|---|---|---|---|---|---|
| Glenn Abbott | 13 | 44.0 | 3 | 4 | 5.93 | 8 |
| Roger Mason | 5 | 22.0 | 1 | 1 | 4.50 | 15 |
| Randy O'Neal | 4 | 18.2 | 2 | 1 | 3.38 | 12 |
| Carl Willis | 10 | 16.0 | 0 | 2 | 7.31 | 4 |

==== Relief pitchers ====
Note: G = Games pitched; W= Wins; L= Losses; SV = Saves; GF = Games Finished; ERA = Earned run average; SO = Strikeouts

| Player | G | W | L | SV | GF | ERA | SO |
|---|---|---|---|---|---|---|---|
| Willie Hernández | 80 | 9 | 3 | 32 | 68 | 1.92 | 112 |
| Aurelio López | 71 | 10 | 1 | 14 | 41 | 2.94 | 94 |
| Doug Bair | 47 | 5 | 3 | 4 | 12 | 3.75 | 57 |
| Sid Monge | 19 | 1 | 0 | 0 | 6 | 4.25 | 19 |
| Bill Scherrer | 18 | 1 | 0 | 0 | 2 | 1.89 | 16 |

== Postseason ==
=== American League Championship Series ===
The Tigers defeated the Kansas City Royals in the 1984 American League Championship Series, three games to none.

Detroit won the opening game 8–1. Jack Morris pitched 7 innings and allowed a single run, with Willie Hernández pitching the final 2 innings. Alan Trammell hit a triple and a home run for 3 RBIs, and Larry Herndon and Lance Parrish also hit home runs for Detroit.

In Game 2, the Tigers won in extra innings 5–3. Kirk Gibson doubled to drive in Lou Whitaker in the 1st inning and hit a home run in the 3rd. Dan Petry pitched 7 innings and gave up 2 runs, but a rare blown save by Willie Hernández cost him a victory. Johnny Grubb hit a double off Dan Quisenberry in the 11th inning to drive in Darrell Evans and Ruppert Jones. Aurelio López held the Royals scoreless in the 9th, 10th and 11th innings to earn the win.

Game 3 was a pitching duel between Milt Wilcox and Charlie Leibrandt. Leibrandt pitched a complete game, allowing only 1 run and 3 hits, while Wilcox gave up 2 hits and struck out 8 Royals, with Hernández pitching the 9th inning for the save. Marty Castillo batted in Chet Lemon for the game's only run, as the Tigers completed a 3-game sweep and advanced to the World Series.

Kirk Gibson was named the Most Valuable Player of the AL Championship Series.

=== World Series ===
The Tigers beat the San Diego Padres in the 1984 World Series, winning the series 4 games to 1.

In Game 1, the Padres led, 2–1, until Larry Herndon hit a 2-out, 2-run home run in the 5th. Jack Morris did not allow another run in his complete-game effort, and the Tigers won, 3–2.

The Padres evened the series in Game 2, on the strength of a Kurt Bevacqua 3-run homer off Dan Petry, as San Diego won its first (and to date only) World Series game.

In Game 3, the Tigers scored 4 runs in the 2nd inning, including 2 on a home run by Marty Castillo, while the San Diego pitchers gave up 11 bases on balls in the first 5 innings, en route to a 5–2 victory for Milt Wilcox.

In Game 4, Alan Trammell hit a pair of 2-run home runs to account for all of Detroit's offense as the Tigers beat Eric Show, 4–2. Jack Morris got his 2nd Series victory and 2nd complete game.

In Game 5, the Tigers scored 3 runs in the 1st inning, but the Padres rallied to tie it in the 4th inning. In the 8th, with Detroit leading 5–4, the Tigers got runners to 2nd and 3rd with 1 out. Padres manager Dick Williams called on Goose Gossage to walk Kirk Gibson and set up a possible double play. Gossage talked Williams into letting him pitch to Gibson, and Gibson responded with a 3-run blast into the right-field upper deck. Detroit radio announcer Ernie Harwell called Gibson's home run on WJR radio as follows:

A high drive to right, and it's a home run for Gibson! A 3-run home run and the Tigers lead it 8–4!

Following the Tigers' victory in Game 5, the celebration by Detroit fans turned violent. A well known photograph taken outside Tiger Stadium shows a Tigers "fan" holding a World Series pennant in front of an overturned burning Detroit police car. The image was printed in newspapers across the country, and became a symbol of Detroit's decline. One writer described the press reaction to the post-game violence as follows:

The final AP report read: "34 arrests, one dead, dozens injured." Few of those arrested had attended the game, but the pictures of burning police cars and taxis appeared in national newspapers and magazines. A photograph of seventeen-year-old Kenneth (Bubba) Helms, an eighth-grade dropout from Lincoln Park, in front of a burning police car, became the image of Detroit's celebration.

=== World Series player stats ===
==== Batting ====
Note: G = Games played; AB = At bats; H = Hits; Avg. = Batting average; HR = Home runs; RBI = Runs batted in

| Player | G | AB | H | Avg. | HR | RBI |
|---|---|---|---|---|---|---|
| Dave Bergman | 5 | 5 | 0 | .000 | 0 | 0 |
| Tom Brookens | 3 | 3 | 0 | .000 | 0 | 0 |
| Marty Castillo | 3 | 9 | 3 | .333 | 1 | 2 |
| Darrell Evans | 5 | 15 | 1 | .067 | 0 | 1 |
| Bárbaro Garbey | 4 | 12 | 0 | .000 | 0 | 0 |
| Kirk Gibson | 5 | 18 | 6 | .333 | 2 | 7 |
| Johnny Grubb | 4 | 3 | 1 | .333 | 0 | 0 |
| Larry Herndon | 5 | 15 | 5 | .333 | 1 | 3 |
| Ruppert Jones | 2 | 3 | 0 | .000 | 0 | 0 |
| Rusty Kuntz | 2 | 1 | 0 | .000 | 0 | 1 |
| Chet Lemon | 5 | 17 | 5 | .294 | 0 | 1 |
| Lance Parrish | 5 | 18 | 5 | .278 | 1 | 2 |
| Alan Trammell | 5 | 20 | 9 | .450 | 2 | 6 |
| Lou Whitaker | 5 | 18 | 5 | .278 | 0 | 0 |

==== Pitching ====
Note: G = Games pitched; IP = Innings pitched; W = Wins; L = Losses; ERA = Earned run average; SO = Strikeouts

| Player | G | IP | W | L | ERA | SO |
|---|---|---|---|---|---|---|
| Jack Morris | 2 | 18.0 | 2 | 0 | 2.00 | 13 |
| Dan Petry | 2 | 8.0 | 0 | 1 | 9.00 | 4 |
| Milt Wilcox | 1 | 6.0 | 1 | 0 | 1.50 | 4 |
| Willie Hernández | 3 | 5.1 | 0 | 0 | 1.69 | 0 |
| Aurelio López | 2 | 3.0 | 1 | 0 | 0.00 | 4 |
| Bill Scherrer | 3 | 3.0 | 0 | 0 | 3.00 | 0 |
| Doug Bair | 1 | 0.2 | 0 | 0 | 0.00 | 1 |

== Award winners and league leaders ==
Sparky Anderson

- AL Manager of the Year Award

Kirk Gibson

- AL Championship Series MVP
- Finished 6th in AL MVP voting
- AL leader in errors by an outfielder (12)
- AL leader in Power/Speed Number (28.0)
- #3 in AL in triples (9)
- #4 in AL in times hit by pitch (8)
- #6 in AL in slugging percentage (.516)
- #8 in AL in stolen bases (29)
- #10 in AL in OPS (.880)

Willie Hernández

- AL Cy Young Award
- AL Most Valuable Player Award
- The Sporting News Pitcher of the Year Award
- AL All Star Team, reserve pitcher
- AL leader in games (80)
- AL leader in games finished (68)
- #3 in AL in saves (32)

Chet Lemon

- AL leader in fielding percentage by a center fielder (.995)
- AL All Star Team, starting center fielder
- #7 in AL in intentional walks (9)
- #8 in AL in doubles (34)
- #8 in AL in times hit by pitch (7)

Jack Morris

- AL All Star Team, pitcher
- AL Babe Ruth Award
- Pitcher of the Month Award, April
- Finished 7th in AL Cy Young Award voting
- AL leader in wild pitches (14)
- #2 in AL in wins (19)
- #4 in AL in games started (35)
- #9 in AL in winning percentage (.633)
- #9 in AL in strikeouts (148)
- #9 in AL in bases on balls allowed (87)

Lance Parrish

- AL Gold Glove Award, catcher
- AL Silver Slugger Award, catcher
- AL All Star Team, starting catcher
- AL leader in double plays at catcher (11)
- Finished 16th in AL MVP voting
- #3 in AL in home runs (33)
- #6 in AL in at bats per home run (17.5)
- #7 in AL in strikeouts (120)

Alan Trammell

- Player of the Month Award, April
- AL All Star Team, shortstop
- 1984 World Series MVP
- AL Gold Glove Award, shortstop
- Finished 9th in AL MVP voting
- #4 in AL in Power/Speed Number (16.1)
- #5 in AL in batting average (.314)
- #6 in AL in times caught stealing (13)
- #8 in AL in on-base percentage (.382)
- #8 in AL in doubles (34)

Lou Whitaker

- AL Gold Glove Award, second base
- AL Silver Slugger Award, second base
- AL All Star Team, starting second baseman

=== Players ranking among top 100 all time at position ===
The following members of the 1984 Detroit Tigers are among the top 100 of all time at their position (in fact, they are all in the top 50), as ranked by The Bill James Historical Baseball Abstract in 2001:

| Player | Position | Rank | Note |
|---|---|---|---|
| Lance Parrish | C | 19th | |
| Lou Whitaker | 2B | 13th | |
| Alan Trammell | SS | 9th | |
| Darrell Evans | 3B | 10th | played in 131 games, but only 19 at third base in 1984 |
| Howard Johnson | 3B | 47th | |
| Kirk Gibson | LF | 36th | played in 149 games, but none in left field in 1984 |
| Chet Lemon | CF | 48th | |

Only one of the players named above (Alan Trammell, selected by the Modern Baseball Committee in 2017) has been elected by the Baseball Writers' Association of America to be inducted into the Baseball Hall of Fame, and any eligibility to be elected as a player by the BBWAA has expired. Manager Sparky Anderson was inducted by the Veterans Committee in 2000. In December 2017, the Modern Baseball Era Committee elected to induct Trammell and pitcher Jack Morris in 2018.

== Farm system ==
| Level | Team | League | Manager |
|---|---|---|---|
| AAA | Evansville Triplets | American Association | Gordon Mackenzie |
| AA | Birmingham Barons | Southern League | Roy Majtyka |
| A | Lakeland Tigers | Florida State League | Bill Fahey |
| Rookie | Bristol Tigers | Appalachian League | Hal Dyer |
