= Bárbaro Garbey =

Cuban baseball player (born 1956)

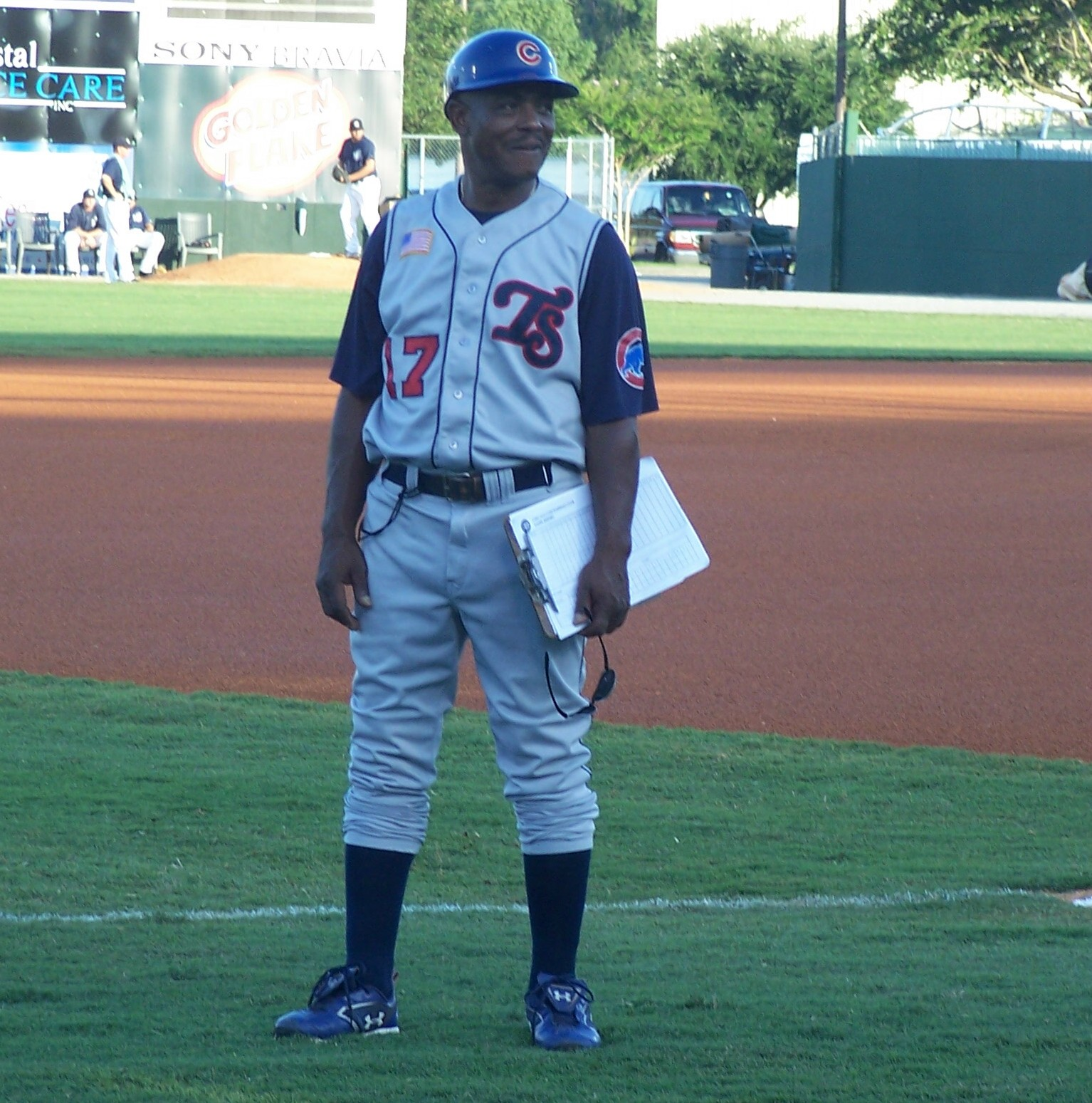
- Outfielder / First baseman
- Born: December 4, 1956 (age 69); Santiago de Cuba, Cuba
- Batted: Right Threw: Right

MLB debut
- April 3, 1984, for the Detroit Tigers

Last MLB appearance
- October 2, 1988, for the Texas Rangers

MLB statistics
- Batting average: .267
- Home runs: 11
- Runs batted in: 86
- Stats at Baseball Reference

Teams
- Detroit Tigers (1984–1985); Texas Rangers (1988)

Career highlights and awards
- World Series champion (1984)

Bárbaro Garbey (/ɡɑːrˈbeɪ/ gar-BAY; born December 4, 1956) is a Cuban former Major League Baseball utility player and minor league coach. Garbey played in the outfield, at first and third bases, and also served as designated hitter.

== Playing career ==
Garbey defected from Cuba in the Mariel boatlift in 1980. He was signed by the Detroit Tigers as an amateur free agent that year. He reached the majors in 1984 with the Tigers, spending two years with them, and earning team Rookie of the Year honors in 1984, before moving to the Texas Rangers (1988). He was a member of the Tigers team that defeated the San Diego Padres in the 1984 World Series.

As a newcomer in 1984, Garbey participated in 110 games, showcasing his versatility by playing at first base, second base, third base, designated hitter, and across all outfield positions. Garbey hit .287 and had more RBIs (52) than several of Detroit's starters, including Howard Johnson, Larry Herndon, and Dave Bergman.

In 1983, Bárbaro was suspended for attacking a fan after a 10-inning game against Louisville.

== Coaching career ==
Since retiring, Garbey has found steady work coaching in the minor leagues. He spent two seasons (2014-15) as the hitting coach for the Peoria Chiefs, and then became a roving instructor for the Cardinals' farm system.

Garbey was named as the hitting coach for the rookie level Danville Braves in the Atlanta Braves organization for the 2018 season.

Garbey was named as the hitting coach for the GCL Braves in the Atlanta Braves organization for the 2019 season. He left the organization in 2020.

== Broadcasting career ==
In 2023, Garbey was hired as a home game color commentator for the Detroit Tigers Radio Network's Spanish-language broadcast.

== See also ==
- 1984 Detroit Tigers season
- List of baseball players who defected from Cuba
