= List of baseball team nicknames =

== Arizona Diamondbacks ==
- The D-backs – Short form of "Diamondbacks".
- The Snakes – A reference to diamondback rattlesnakes.
- The D-bags – A reference to the colloquial insult term douchebag used by detractors.
- The Answerbacks – A reference to the 2023 team that went on to win the National League pennant after the Diamondbacks fell to a 2-0 and 3-2 series deficit to the Phillies in the 2023 NLCS only for Arizona to rally back to win the series with a Game 4 comeback at home and two consecutive road wins in Philadelphia in Games 6 and 7.

== Athletics ==
- Mackmen (when the team played in Philadelphia) – In reference to their manager, Connie Mack.
- The A's – Short form of "Athletics". Emphasized by Charlie Finley during his ownership of the team in the 1960s and 1970s. Perhaps the most commonly used nickname on this list.
- The Green and Gold – A reference to the current team's colors.
- The Swingin' A's – A reference to the early 1970s championship teams.
- The Big Green Machine – Based on the Big Red Machine nickname of the Cincinnati Reds, another team that dominated in the 1970s.
- The White Elephants – A reference to their mascot, which is itself a defiant reference to a comment made by Hall of Fame manager John McGraw, calling the team a "white elephant".
- The Elephants – Short form of the previous.
- The Oakland Triple-A's (AAAs) – A reference to Triple-A Minor League Baseball, used by some to highlight their lack of competitive skill or poor play during rough years.
- Assletics – Used by detractors, especially when the team performs poorly during a season.

== Atlanta Braves ==
- The Bravos – Variation of "Braves".
- America's Team – A reference to the Braves' games being broadcast nationwide.
- The Barves – Another variation of "Braves", derived from a misspelling of the team's name on counterfeit merchandise. Used by detractors, primarily Philadelphia Phillies fans.
- Braves Country – A term for the team's avid followers, particularly those in the Southeast.
- Georgia Braves – A reference to the fact that the team is located in Georgia.
- The Cowards – Opposite of Braves; used derisively by detractors.
- The Peach Clobbers – Nickname of the hard-hitting 2013 team.
- The Curse City of Atlanta – A reference to Atlanta teams having a history of struggling in the playoffs; used derisively by detractors.

== Baltimore Orioles ==
- The O's – Short form of "Orioles". Fans traditionally shout the "O!" at the beginning of the seventh line of the Star Spangled Banner in unison.
- The Birds – A reference to orioles, which are birds.
- The Orange Birds – A reference to male orioles, which are orange birds.
- The Oreos – Homophone of "Orioles", used particularly among older fans.

== Boston Red Sox ==
- The BoSox – Combination of "Boston" and "Sox". Coined by the media to distinguish from the Chicago White Sox, or "ChiSox".
- The Sox – Short form of "Red Sox".
- The Sawx – In imitation of the Boston accent.
- The Crimson Hose – A variation of "Red Sox".
- The Olde Towne Team
- The Carmines – A type of red pigment. This nickname is used often by former Red Sox player and retired White Sox broadcaster Ken Harrelson.
- Red Sox Nation – Avid followers.
- The Nation – Short form of "Red Sox Nation".
- The Cardiac Kids – 1967 team nickname.
- The Red Sux – Used by detractors, particularly by fans of the New York Yankees.
- The Dead Sox – A reference to the Game 7 loss in the 2003 ALCS to the Yankees.

== Chicago Cubs ==
- The Cubbies – Familiar version of "Cubs".
- The Baby Bears – Referring to the meaning of cubs.
- The Little Bears – Referring to the meaning of cubs.
- The Blue Bears – Referring to the color of the bear in the team's logo.
- Go Cubs Go – An official team and victory song written by Steve Goodman in 1984 that becomes popular when the Cubs are successful.
- The Loveable Losers – A reference to the team's ability to maintain a loyal fan base despite decades of failure to win the pennant.
- The Northsiders – To differentiate from the White Sox, who play on the South Side.
- The Northside Nine – Same as the previous.
- The Flubs – Referring to the Cubs team when failing to meet expectations.
- The Boys of Zimmer – A reference to the NL East division-winning 1989 team managed by Don Zimmer and the 1972 book, The Boys of Summer by Roger Kahn.
- The Big Blue Train
- Chicago Orphans – Cap Anson was the first player credited with 3,000 hits. In 1897 he was released as player/manager after 22 seasons with the club. After his departure, they became known as the Orphans.

== Chicago White Sox ==
- The Sox – Short form of "White Sox".
- The ChiSox – Combination of "Chicago" and "Sox". Coined by the media to distinguish from the Boston Red Sox, or "BoSox".
- The Southsiders – To differentiate from the Cubs, who play on the North Side.
- The Pale Hose – Variation of "White Sox".
- The Black and White – A reference to the team's colors.
- The Hitless Wonders – A reference to the 1906 team that won the AL pennant and World Series despite a .230 team batting average.
- The Black Sox – A reference to the infamous 1919 team, which fixed the World Series in what came to be known as the "Black Sox Scandal".
- The Go-Go Sox – A reference to the 1959 AL championship team.
- The South Side Hitmen – A reference to the high-slugging 1977 team.
- Winning Ugly – A reference to the 1983 division champion team.
- The White Sux – A reference to the 2024 team, which broke the record for most losses in a single season.
- One-Two-One – Another reference to the 2024 team, with the nickname being the total losses in the 2024 MLB season.

== Cincinnati Reds ==
- The Big Red Machine – A reference to the 1970s teams that won six divisional titles, four pennants and two World Series titles.
- The Redlegs – Temporary team name to differentiate from Communists during the Red Scare, who were also referred to as "Reds".
- The Nasty Boys – A reference to the bullpen trio of Rob Dibble, Norm Charlton, and Randy Myers, who led the 1990 Reds to a World Series sweep.

== Cleveland Guardians ==
- The Guards – Short form of "Guardians".
- Guardiac Kids – A play on Kardiac Kids, a beloved nickname of the local football team (Cleveland Browns). Also, alluding to the youngest player roster in all of MLB and AAA (26 years) during the 2022 inaugural season with the new name, Guardians.
- Indians – A reference to the team's former name.
- The Tribe – A reference to the team's former name. Tribes are social structures among American Indigenous people.
- Chief Wahoo's Tribe – A reference to the team's former logo, an Indigenous person called "Chief Wahoo".
- The Wahoos – Same as the previous.
- The Windians – A reference to the team that wins a lot, especially the 22-game winning streak in 2017. The number of W's before 'Indians' represents how many games the Indians won in a row.
- The Injuns – Used by detractors.
- The Erie Warriors – A reference to Cleveland's location on the shore of Lake Erie.

== Colorado Rockies ==
- The Rocks – Short form of "Rockies".
- The Rox – Homophone of "Rocks". Imitation of the names of the Red Sox and White Sox.
- The Blake Street Bombers – A reference to the street Coors Field is on.
- The Blake Street Bullies – Same as the previous.
- Todd and the Toddlers – A reference to when Rockies first baseman Todd Helton was a veteran player surrounded by a team full of rookies and young players.

== Detroit Tigers ==
- The Cats – A reference to tigers being members of the cat family.
- The Motor City Kitties – A nickname given during the 2003 season, when the team finished with a 43–119 record.
- The Kitties – Short form of the previous.
- The Tabbies – Playful feline variation.
- The Tiggs – Short form of "Tigers".
- The Declawed Tigers – A reference to their 12 consecutive losing seasons from 1994 to 2005.
- The Pussies or Pussys – Used by detractors, mainly White Sox and Twins fans.
- The Pussy Cats – Same as the previous.
- The Bengals – A reference to Bengal tigers, a species of tiger.
- The Bengal Tigers – Long form of the previous.
- Motor City Bengals – Same as the previous but with a reference to Motor City, one of the city of Detroit's nicknames.
- The/Los Tigres – Playful Spanish variation, often used with English definite article "The" instead of the Spanish "Los".
- The Bless You Boys – A reference to the World Series championship team of 1984 and teams from surrounding years.
- The Gritty Tigs – A reference to the 2024 team.
- The Wolverines – A reference to the University of Michigan Wolverines and to Detroit's first MLB team.

== Houston Astros ==
- The Killer B's – From the 1990s. A reference to the team whose players' surnames begin with the letter B that won four National League Central divisional titles and one National League pennant.
- The Stros – Short form of "Astros".
- Crush City – A reference to the 2015 team that led the league in home runs.
- The Stars – A reference to the team logo.
- The Astronauts – Long form of "Astros". To honor astronauts who occasionally come to the ballpark.
- The Blastros – A reference to having a lot of home run pop in the lineup since 2015.
- The Astronomicals – From Cincinnati Reds radio broadcaster Marty Brennaman.
- 8th Wonder of the World – A homage to the team's former stadium, the Astrodome, the world's first multipurpose domed sports stadium.
- The Asstros – Used by detractors.
- The Asterisks – Used by detractors. In reference to the 2017 sign stealing scandal.
- The Cheaters – Used by detractors. In reference to the 2017 sign stealing scandal.
- Cheat City – Used by detractors. Also in reference to the 2017 sign stealing scandal.
- The Trashcans – Used by detractors. Also in reference to the 2017 sign stealing scandal.
- Trashcan Bangers – Used by detractors. Also in reference to the 2017 sign stealing scandal.
- The Asstrolls – Used by detractors. Also in reference to the 2017 sign stealing scandal.
- Trash City – Used by detractors. Also in reference to the 2017 sign stealing scandal.
- The Cheatros – Used by detractors. Also in reference to the 2017 sign stealing scandal.
- The Asteroids – Used jokingly following a fan interview conducted by ESPN during a Sunday night game in September 2023.
- The Trashtros – Used by detractors. Also in reference to the 2017 sign stealing stealing scandal.scandal.

== Kansas City Royals ==
- The Boys in Blue – A reference to one of the team's colors. Not commonly used, except in marketing.
- The Comeback Kids – A reference to the young Royals team winning eight postseason games via comebacks en route to their 2015 World Series title.
- The Crowns – A reference to the crown in the team logo, and at the top of the large video board at Kauffman Stadium.
- The Monarchs – A reference to the former Negro league team in Kansas City. Also a term associated with royalty.
- The 'Yals – Abbreviation of Royals, used particularly among younger fans.
- The Forever Royals – A reference to the core players Salvador Perez, Alex Gordon, Eric Hosmer, Mike Moustakas, Lorenzo Cain, and Alcides Escobar that helped the Royals win the 2015 World Series and remain beloved by Royals fans.

== Los Angeles Angels ==
- The Halos – A reference to an angel's halo. The halo is featured on the large "A" outside the stadium and was once a prominent part of the team logo.
- The Anaheim Angels – The team's official name from 1997 to 2004; a reference to the fact that the Angels are not from Los Angeles County, but the Orange County city of Anaheim.
- Los Angeles Angels of Anaheim – The team's official name from 2005 to 2015; the team went by this to fulfill a contractual obligation to the City of Anaheim.
- The Angels Angels of Anaheim – Spanish "Los Angeles" translated to English.
- Los Angelinos – Name in Spanish. A reference to the large Hispanic population of Orange County.
- California Angels – A reference to the team's official name from 1965–1996.
- AAAAngels – A reference to the team's failure to reach the playoffs since 2014 and their failure to finish over .500 since 2018.

== Los Angeles Dodgers ==
- The Blue Crew – A reference to the team's primary color.
- The Boys in Blue – Same as the previous.
- Bleeding Dodger Blue – Avid fans.
- Dem Bums – From the Brooklyn years. A reference to the team's difficulties winning a world championship during the era. Originally derogatory, Dodgers fans later adopted it as a term of affection.
- The Boys of Summer – From the Brooklyn years. A reference to baseball being the only major team sport played during the summer. As with "Dem Bums", usage of this nickname for the Dodgers has faded with time; "Boys of Summer" is now often used to refer to baseball players in general.
- The Azul – Spanish word for blue.
- The Lords of Flatbush – A nickname of the Dodgers when they were in Brooklyn.
- The Trolley Dodgers – A nickname of the Dodgers when they were in Brooklyn. This was the name of the team before it was shortened to "Dodgers" in the 1930s.
- The Evil Empire of the West – Used by detractors. A reference to the Yankees' nickname and to the Dodgers' ballooning payroll in 2013.
- The Yankees of the West – Same as the previous.
- The Doyers – Used primarily by Latino fans, in reference to the pronunciation of Dodgers in Spanish.
- Blue Heaven on Earth – A reference to Dodger Stadium coined by Tommy Lasorda.
- Mickey Mouse Champions – A nickname used by detractors for the Dodgers team that won the 2020 World Series when teams only played 60 regular season games (37% of a full season) due to the COVID-19 pandemic as a way to negate the legitimacy of the title.
- The Fraudgers – Used by detractors.

== Miami Marlins ==
- The Fish – A reference to marlins, which are fish.
- The Fightin' Fish – A longer version of the previous.
- The Miracle Marlins – In reference to winning two World Series titles in two playoff appearances despite never winning a division title.
- The Fins – A reference to the fins of a marlin. Also a nickname of the NFL's Miami Dolphins, who had shared a facility with the Marlins.

== Milwaukee Brewers ==
- The Brew Crew – Short form of the formal name.
- The Crew – Short form of the previous.
- The True Blue Brew Crew – A name consisting of a short version of "Brewers" and words that rhyme with it.
- The Beermakers – A play on the official name.
- The Brew-Hahs – An ESPN invention (as in "brouhaha").
- Harvey's Wallbangers – A reference to the AL pennant-winning 1982 team managed by Harvey Kuenn.
- The Home of a Prince – A reference to when Prince Fielder played first base for the Brewers.
- The/Los Cerveceros – Spanish translation of Brewers, used on uniforms for annual Cerveceros Day Hispanic heritage game.
- The Creamers – For the cream in their jerseys and their offense.

== Minnesota Twins ==
- The Bomba Squad – Self-dubbed by left fielder Eddie Rosario in 2019, when the team broke the MLB record for most home runs prior to the All-Star break.
- BombaSota – A derivative of the previous.
- The Minnesota Lumber Company – A reference to the Twins' prodigious offense in the 1977 and 1978 seasons.
- The Nats – Short form of the team's former nickname (Nationals) when they were in Washington. Continued in use after 1954, when the team's name was officially changed to the Senators. Discontinued after the team moved to Minnesota.
- Piranhas – A reference to their aggressive "small ball" style of play, coined by rival Chicago White Sox manager Ozzie Guillén. Coined during the 2004 season, continued into 2005, used sporadically through the remainder of the 2000s decade. No longer in use.
- The Twinkies – Familiar version of "Twins". Also a popular snack cake. Officially deprecated by the team, heavily used in seasons where the team is doing poorly.
- The T_s – Used by detractors in reference to the Twins' playoff game losing streak that lasted 18 consecutive games from 2004-2023.

== Montreal Expos ==
- The 'Spos – Short form of "Expos".
- Les Expos – French for "The Expos".
- Nos Amours – French for "Our Loves".

== New York Mets ==
- The Metropolitans – A reference to the 19th-century New York baseball club (New York Metropolitans) and the source of the "Mets" name. Noted New York radio personality Steve Somers of WFAN commonly refers to the present-day Mets as the "Metropolitans."
- The Amazin' Mets – A phrase first coined by former manager Casey Stengel, became a reference to the Mets 1969 championship season and for the years to follow.
- The Amazin's – Short form of the previous; more commonly used.
- The Metsies – Affectionate term used by fans and Mets broadcasters alike.
- The Orange and Blue – A reference to the team's colors, which are sung of in the song Meet the Mets.
- The Kings of Queens – A reference to the team's home, the New York City borough of Queens.
- The Loveable Losers – From the 1960s. A reference to the team's mediocrity in its early years.
- The Miracle Mets – A reference to the 1969 Mets, when they went from a losing club to world champions.
- The Mets Machine – A reference to the 1969 Mets.
- The Magical Mystery Mets – A reference to the 1969 Mets.
- The Bad Guys – A reference to the 1986 Mets, who were known for their high level of performance, hard-living lifestyles, and conflicts with each other and other teams on and off the field. Jeff Pearlman wrote a book about this team titled The Bad Guys Won.
- The Methodical Mets – Coined by baseball writer Tracy Ringolsby of the 1986 Mets.
- The Locomotives – A reference to the 1986 Mets.
- The Dominating Mets – A reference to the 1986 Mets.
- Fall-Short Mets – A reference to the 1989 Mets, who led in the season standings all summer, slumped during the final two weeks of the season, allowing the Chicago Cubs to pass them in the standings.
- Los Mets – A reference to the large number of Hispanic players acquired by Omar Minaya during his tenure as general manager from 2004 to 2010.
- LOLMets – An internet meme referencing the ineptitude of some Mets teams, originally referring to the 2007 Mets who lost a big NL East division lead after a late-season collapse.
- My Entire Team Sucks – Derisive acronym.
- Most Exciting Team in Sports – Acronym used by fans to rebut the previous derisive acronym.
- Make Every Team Suffer — The latest acronym adopted by fans to rebut the previous derisive acronym.
- The Other New York Team – The other being the longer-established New York Yankees.
- Pondscum – Used by detractors, mainly by St. Louis Cardinals fans in 1987.
- The Mutts – Used by fans as an endearment, often when the team is struggling. Also used by detractors, notably by Philadelphia Phillies fans.
- The Mess – Used by detractors.
- OMG Mets – Used by the 2024 Mets, inspired by the hit single "OMG" by infielder Jose Iglesias, which was played throughout the season.
- Grimace Mets – Used by the 2024 Mets, inspired by McDonald's mascot Grimace, which became a prominent symbol for the Mets throughout the season.

== New York Yankees ==
- The Yanks – Short form of "Yankees".
- The Pinstripes – A reference to the team's pinstriped uniforms.
- The Bronx Bombers – A reference to the team's home, the New York City borough of the Bronx, along with their propensity for hitting "bombs" (home runs).
- The Bombers – Short form of the previous.
- The Baby Bombers – A description of the relatively young team in 2017 that had much more power than expected and were led by Aaron Judge, a rookie who led the American League with 52 home runs.
- The New Yorkers – A reference to New York City, and the publication The New Yorker.
- The Damn Yankees – A reference to the play and movie of the same name. Used by detractors around Major League Baseball for winning too many championships.
- Murderers' Row – A reference to the championship Yankee teams of the late 1920s, and the first six hitters in the 1927 lineup in particular.
- The Stankees – Used by detractors.
- The Evil Empire – Used by detractors. A reference to the famous indictment of communism by Ronald Reagan. Coined as a term for the Yankees by Red Sox executive Larry Lucchino after the Yankees got rights to deal with José Contreras. The term has been embraced by many Yankees fans.
- The Bronx Zoo – Used by detractors. A reference to the team and the Bronx's turbulent times in the late 1970s, and also the name of a book written by former Yankees pitcher Sparky Lyle about the team's 1978 season. Still used sometimes to describe the organization and stadium. The term has been embraced by many Yankees fans.
- The Highlanders – The team's former name before it became the Yankees. Derived from the Highlands of the Bronx cliffs.

== Philadelphia Phillies ==
- The Phils – Short form of "Phillies".
- The Fightin' Phils – A reference to their hard-nosed style of play. (Some Phillies fans will add "Ph" instead of an "F" for most anything associated with the Phillies, such as "The Phightin' Phils").
- The Phightin's – Short form of the previous.
- The Phiwwies – In imitation of the Philadelphia accent.
- The Foitin' Phiws – Another version of the previous.
- Phillie Phanatics – Used to describe avid followers. A reference to the team's mascot, the Phillie Phanatic.
- The Red Pinstripes – A reference to the team's red pinstriped uniforms.
- The Quaker City Team
- The Whiz Kids – Name for the 1950 NL Championship team. A reference to their youth.
- The Wheeze Kids – Name for the 1983 NL Championship team. A reference to their lack of youth.
- The Broad Street Bellies – A reference to the 1993 NL Championship team for their lack of physical fitness, and the nickname of the NHL's nearby Philadelphia Flyers, the "Broad Street Bullies".
- Macho Row – A reference to the 1993 NL Championship team.
- The Cardiac Kids – Originally a 1950s nickname, better known as the nickname of the 1980 World Championship team.
- The Pillies – A reference to an amphetamine scandal in the early 1980s.
- The Philthies – Used by detractors.
- The Sillies – Used by detractors, particularly NL East rivals. Also occasionally used by the team's own fans, especially when the team is underperforming.
- The Frillies – Used by detractors.

== Pittsburgh Pirates ==
- The Buccaneers – A synonym for pirates.
- The Bucs – Short form of the previous. Also used by the Tampa Bay Buccaneers of the NFL.
- The Buccos – Most frequently used nickname, also shortened from "buccaneers."
- The Black and Gold – A reference to the team's colors.
- The Family – Name adopted during the 1979 World Series Championship season. Derived from the Sister Sledge song "We Are Family", which had become the team's theme song. Sometimes stylized as "Fam-a-lee".

== San Diego Padres ==
- The Pads – Short form of "Padres". Pronounced "Pods."
- The Friars – A reference to Spanish Franciscan friars, who founded San Diego in 1769.
- The Swinging Friars – Variation of the previous. A reference to the "friar swinging a baseball bat" logo used on and off by the team. Also a mascot of the San Diego Padres.
- The Chaplains – Nickname during the Pacific Coast League days throughout the World War II and Korean War eras, referencing the title "Padre" given to military chaplains.
- The Dads – A mistranslation of the word padres.
- The Say May Kids – Nickname given by former Padres announcer Matt Vasgersian, referring to the team playing great in May for consecutive years. Likely a spin on Willie Mays's nickname "the Say Hey Kid".
- Friar Faithful – A spin on "Friars" and the 1998 Padres' "Keep the Faith" campaign to drum up local support for the National League pennant-winning team.
- The Pesky Padres – Nickname given in San Francisco Giants official program for their game in San Francisco on July 7, 2011. A reference to the Padres' recent success against the Giants despite generally finishing behind them in the NL West standings, especially their 12–6 record against San Francisco in 2010; the Giants were forced to win a regular-season tie-breaking game to enter the playoffs and eventually won the World Series.
- Slam Diego Padres – Nickname given during the 2020 season in reference to the Padres' record streak of four consecutive games with a grand slam.
- The Boys in Brown – A reference to the team's colors.
- Shame Diego – Used by detractors.
- The Fraudres – Used by detractors.
- Little Brother of Dodgers and Giants – Used by detractors in reference to the comparatively greater success of the rival Los Angeles Dodgers and San Francisco Giants.
- The Offseason Champions – Used by detractors, particularly during the 2015 and 2021 seasons, in which the team finished with a losing record despite high-profile offseason acquisitions.
- The Poodres – Used by detractors, especially in reference to the Padres' brown uniforms.

== San Francisco Giants ==
- The G-Men – A reference to a nickname for a government agent. Also used for the American football team with whom the baseball club used to share a name and a home stadium, the New York Giants.
- Los Gigantes – Spanish for Giants. Used on the team's uniform on Cinco de Mayo of 2007, and during Saturday home games in 2026.
- The Orange and Black – A reference to the team's colors.
- The Jints (rhymes with "pints", not "mints") – A phonetic rendering of the New York pronunciation of "Giants", dating to when the club was in New York. Fell out of use after the club relocated to San Francisco.
- The Gints – An alternate spelling of the previous sometimes found in later publications (post-relocation).
- The Gyros
- The Orange Nation – A reference to their orange alternate uniforms and fanbase.
- The Orange Giants – A reference to their orange alternate uniforms and color scheme.
- The Boys from the Bay – A geographic nickname alluding to the San Francisco Bay Area where the majority of their fanbase resides.
- The Bay Bombers – A geographic nickname like the previous, but also refers to 'bomb,' a term for a home run.
- The Pacific Sock Exchange – The late 1980s and early 1990s Giants duo of Will Clark and Kevin Mitchell.
- The Gnats – Used by detractors. Mainly used by rival team fans.

== Seattle Mariners ==
- The M's – A reference to the first letter in "Mariners".
- Los Marineros – Spanish language name for the team.
- The Tridents – A reference to the trident, a maritime symbol.

== St. Louis Cardinals ==
- The Cards – Short form of "Cardinals".
- The Redbirds – A reference to the cardinal, which is a red bird. Name of the Cardinals' Triple-A affiliate Memphis Redbirds.
- The Birds – A reference to the cardinal, which is a bird.
- The Birds on the Bat – A reference to the longtime logo on the front of the uniform jersey.
- The Dirty Birds – Derisive term used mostly by Mets fans in the 1980s.
- The Gashouse Gang – Name for the 1934 World Championship team. A reference to their shabby appearance and rough tactics.
- The Runnin' Redbirds – Name for the 1980s Cardinals. A reference to their speed and small-ball tactics.
- El Birdos – Nickname given to the 1967 World Series Champion Cardinals team by Orlando Cepeda. A reference to the small Hispanic population of St. Louis, as 'El' is "the" in Spanish and 'Birdos' meant "Birds".
- The Rally Birds – A reference to the Cardinals being the top underdog team in 2011 after they were down 10½ games in the NL Wild Card standings on August 25 and came back and won the Wild Card and their 11th World Series title via several late rallies in Game 6.
- The Rally Cards – Same as the previous.
- The Cardnals – A common pronunciation when "Cardinals" is spoken quickly.
- The Birdinals – Portmanteau of "bird" and "cardinal".
- The Birdnals – A combination of the two previous entries.
- The Fantastic Five – Nickname given to the 1980s Cardinals. A reference to the five players who won three pennants in the 1980s.
- The Hardcore Cardinals – Nickname given to the 1980s Cardinals.

== Tampa Bay Rays ==
- The Rays – Short form of the original "Devil Rays" nickname which became the current name (that now suggests "rays" of Florida sunshine as well as the fish).
- The D-Rays – Short form of the team's original name, the "Devil Rays". Some media outlets have stated that they will continue to use the now obsolete moniker.
- The Manta Rays – A reference to the Devil Rays logo.
- The Mantas – Short form of the previous.
- The Eagle Rays – A reference to the fact that manta rays and devil rays are eagle rays.
- The Devil Dogs – Fan-friendly nickname.

== Texas Rangers ==
- The Nats – A historical nickname inherited from the Washington Senators, although this franchise was never officially called the Nationals.
- The Strangers – A reference to their traditional losing seasons (the team did not make the playoffs until 1996, 25 years after relocating to the Dallas-Fort Worth Metroplex, and even with recent success has historically been one of MLB's weakest franchises).
- The Power Rangers – A reference to their slugging years from the late 1990s to early 2010s.
- The Lone Stars – A reference to Texas's nickname, the "Lone Star State". This team nickname has been rarely used in recent years.
- South Oklahoma Rangers – Derogatory nickname from rival fans of the Houston Astros due to the team having Texas in its name while playing in Arlington, Texas, which is a suburb 80 miles south of the Oklahoma border.
- The Little Rascals – A reference to the young hitting prospects on the 2025 Rangers who kept the team in contention during September after many of their veterans were injured.

== Toronto Blue Jays ==
- The Jays – Short form of "Blue Jays".
- The Blue Birds – Another name due to their mascot being a blue jay.
- The Birds – A reference to jays, which are birds.
- The Blue Hyays – The popular Spanish pronunciation of the Blue Jays.
- The Blow Jays – Used when they are playing terribly, especially when they are choking.
- The BJ's – Short form of "Blue Jays".
- Canada’s Team - a nickname in reference to the fact that they are the only Canadian MLB team.

== Washington Nationals ==
- Natspos – A combination of Nationals and Expos.
- The Nats – Short form of "Nationals". Revived from its prior use for the Washington Nationals/Senators (Minnesota Twins) and Washington Senators (Texas Rangers).
- The Nasty Nats – A reference to the team playing terribly for a few years after moving to Washington in 2005.
- The Natsies – Affectionate derivative of Nats.
- Fighters – A reference to the Nationals winning the World Series in 2019 after starting the season 19–31 and winning all five games in the postseason when facing elimination. They trailed in all five of those contests.
- Fightin' Nats – Same as the previous.
- The Gnats – A reference to the team's abbreviated name sounding similar to gnats, tiny flying insects often viewed as pests. Used by detractors.
- Walk-Off City – A reference to the 2014 win streak where many of the games came via walk-offs at Nationals Park.
- The Natinals – Derisive, due to an instance of misspelling on team uniforms in 2009.
- The Trashionals – Used by detractors, mainly Mets and Orioles fans.
- The Walgreens – A reference to the Nationals' logo appearing very similar to the Walgreens logo. Used by detractors.

== See also ==
- Lists of nicknames – nickname list articles on Wikipedia
- Athletic nickname
