= Bryan Kelly (baseball) =

American baseball player (born 1959)

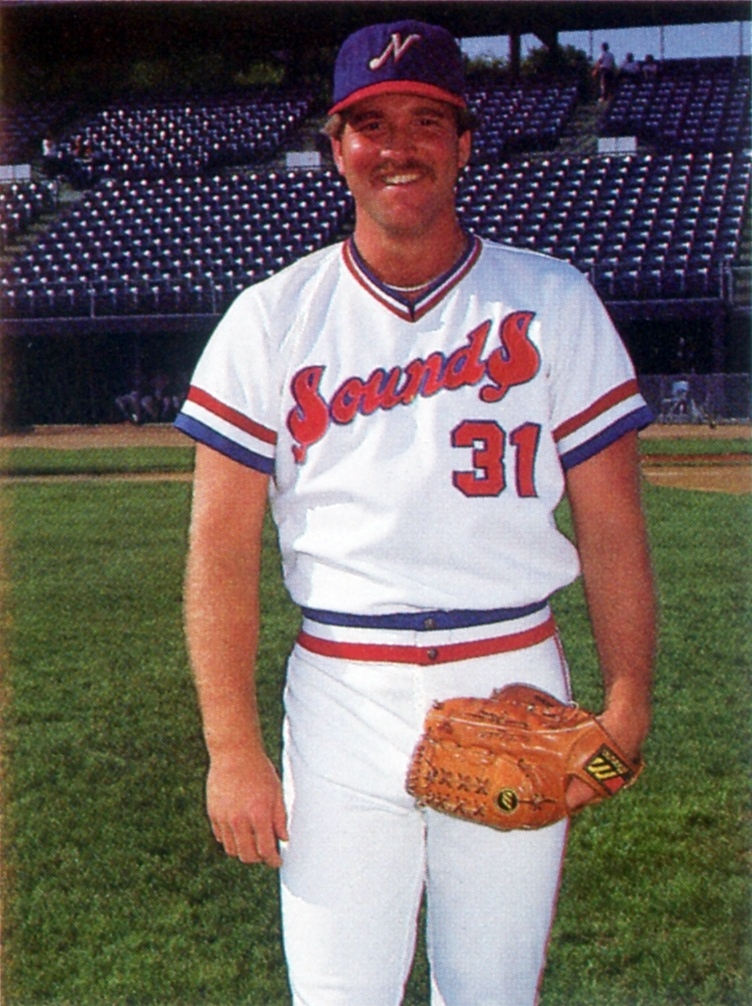
- Kelly with the Nashville Sounds in 1985
- Pitcher
- Born: February 24, 1959 (age 67); Silver Spring, Maryland, U.S.
- Batted: Right Threw: Right

MLB debut
- September 2, 1986, for the Detroit Tigers

Last MLB appearance
- May 2, 1987, for the Detroit Tigers

MLB statistics
- Win–loss record: 1–3
- Earned run average: 4.70
- Strikeouts: 28
- Stats at Baseball Reference

Teams
- Detroit Tigers (1986–1987)

Bryan Keith Kelly (born February 24, 1959) is an American former professional baseball pitcher. He played during two seasons in Major League Baseball (MLB) for the Detroit Tigers.

Kelly was drafted by the Tigers in the 6th round of the 1981 MLB draft. He played his first professional season with their Class A Macon Peaches and Lakeland Tigers in 1981. In 1982, he played with Lakeland and the Double-A Birmingham Barons. He started the 1983 season with Birmingham before being promoted to the Triple-A Evansville Triplets. He spent all of 1984 at Double-A with Birmingham. In 1985, he was back at Triple-A with the Nashville Sounds, spending the entire season in Music City.

On July 17, 1985, he pitched a no-hitter for Nashville against the Oklahoma City 89ers at Greer Stadium in Nashville, Tennessee. The no-hit bid was nearly broken up in the eighth inning when Nick Capra executed a swinging bunt down the first base line, but first baseman Mike Laga fielded the ball and tossed it to Kelly who rushed to step on first for the out.

Kelly started 1986 with Nashville before making his major league debut with the Tigers on September 2. He split the beginning of the 1987 season between Detroit and their Triple-A Toledo Mud Hens before being traded to the Seattle Mariners on June 22. He made six starts for Seattle's Triple-A Calgary Cannons in what became his last professional season.
