= Bless You Boys =

1984 book by Sparky Anderson

Bless You Boys: Diary of the Detroit Tigers' 1984 Season
- Front cover of Bless You Boys
- Author: Sparky Anderson with Dan Ewald
- Language: English
- Genre: Sports
- Publisher: Contemporary Books
- Publication date: 1984
- Publication place: United States
- Media type: Print (Hardback & Paperback)
- Pages: 232 pp (first edition, paperback)

Bless You Boys: Diary of the Detroit Tigers' 1984 Season is a book written in 1984 by Sparky Anderson with Dan Ewald. The phrase "Bless You Boys" was the catchphrase adopted by Detroit sportscaster Al Ackerman for the 1984 Detroit Tigers team that started the year with a 35–5 start.

== The book ==
The book was published by Contemporary Books and contains Anderson's diary account of the first 151 games of the 1984 Detroit Tigers World Series championship season. The team started the year on a remarkable 35–5 pace and became the first American League team since the 1927 New York Yankees to "lead the race from wire-to-wire" and win the World Series. The book was written with the help of Tigers' public relations director Dan Ewald. Anderson noted that he wrote the book by recording his immediate reactions after each game: "It was fun. Every night before I went to bed, I'd put the game on tape. This is easy – you just sit and talk."

== Success of the book ==
Bless You Boys was released as an "insta-book" in October 1984 to capitalize on the publicity that followed the Tigers' World Series championship. It was an instant best-seller in the Detroit area. Anderson conducted a week-long book signing tour that opened at the Hudson's store at Northland Mall. The Detroit Free Press reported that the crowd waiting to have Sparky sign the book "stretched through most of Hudson's basement, snaking back through the carpet and furniture departments, all the way back to fine furniture." The Detroit Free Press described the public reaction to the book this way:

Hundreds of fans – some wearing three-piece business suits, some wearing diapers and seated in strollers, many sporting Detroit Tigers caps – lined up in Hudson's Northland basement to have Sparky autograph his new book. ... It's going faster than World Series tickets, which could make Sparky something of a threat to Norman Mailer in this writing business.

Near the end of the book-signing tour, Anderson noted that his hand was "very sore." He added: "We're over 100,000 printed now. They say it's the greatest thing they've ever had. They said in New York it was even outselling Iacocca." When U.S. vice presidential candidate Geraldine Ferraro visited Detroit on a campaign stop in late October, she opened her remarks by saying, "I just want to start off by saying, bless you, boys – and girls." One bookstore owner noted there was a mob scene at his store when Anderson showed up to sign his book: "There never was anything like it."

== Critical reception ==
The book also drew attention for Sparky's colorful manner of speech. The Los Angeles Times noted that Sparky needed to read a bit more about the Websters (Noah and Daniel) based on Sparky's statement in the book: "I've heard or read all of the adjectives old Daniel Webster put in his dictionary, and none of them does my bullpen justice."
