= Scott Earl =

American baseball player (born 1960)

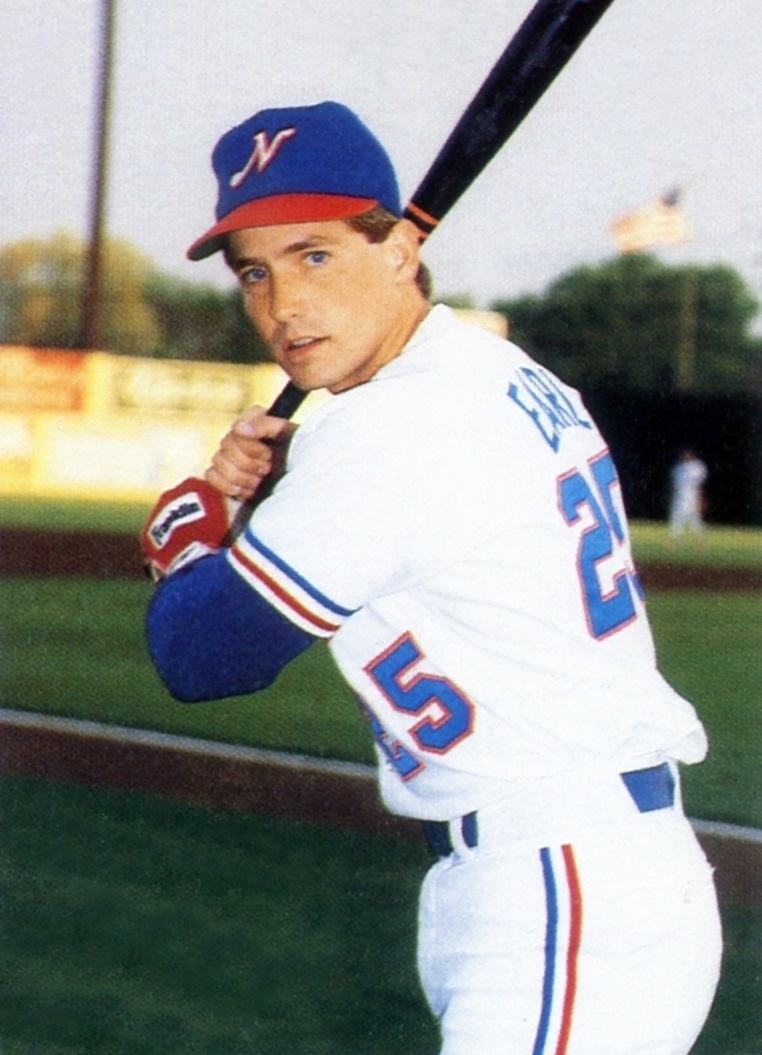
- Earl with the Nashville Sounds in 1988
- Second baseman
- Born: September 18, 1960 (age 65); Seymour, Indiana, U.S.
- Batted: Right Threw: Right

MLB debut
- September 10, 1984, for the Detroit Tigers

Last MLB appearance
- September 30, 1984, for the Detroit Tigers

MLB statistics
- Batting average: .114
- Runs: 3
- Hits: 4
- Stats at Baseball Reference

Teams
- Detroit Tigers (1984)

William Scott Earl (born September 18, 1960) is an American former Major League Baseball second baseman. He was raised in North Vernon, IN and graduated from Jennings County High School. He played during one season at the major league level for the Detroit Tigers. He was drafted by the Tigers in the 14th round of the 1981 amateur draft. Earl played his first professional season with their Bristol Tigers in 1981, and split his last season between their Triple-A club, the Toledo Mud Hens and the New York Yankees' Columbus Clippers, in 1989.
