= Randy O'Neal =

American baseball player (born 1960)

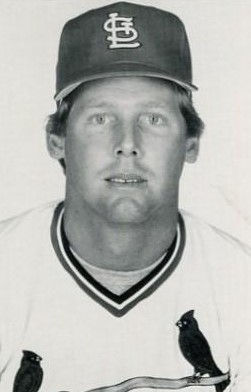
- Pitcher
- Born: August 30, 1960 (age 65); Ashland, Kentucky, U.S.
- Batted: Right Threw: Right

MLB debut
- September 12, 1984, for the Detroit Tigers

Last MLB appearance
- October 2, 1990, for the San Francisco Giants

MLB statistics
- Win–loss record: 17–19
- Earned run average: 4.35
- Strikeouts: 248
- Stats at Baseball Reference

Teams
- Detroit Tigers (1984–1986); Atlanta Braves (1987); St. Louis Cardinals (1987–1988); Philadelphia Phillies (1989); San Francisco Giants (1990)

Randall Jeffrey O'Neal (born August 30, 1960) is an American former college and professional baseball player who was a pitcher in Major League Baseball (MLB) for seven seasons. He played at the major league level for the Detroit Tigers, Atlanta Braves, St. Louis Cardinals, Philadelphia Phillies, and San Francisco Giants.

== Early life ==
O'Neal was born in Ashland, Kentucky. He attended Palm Beach Community College in West Palm Beach, Florida, and then accepted an athletic scholarship to transfer to the University of Florida in Gainesville, Florida, where he played for the Florida Gators baseball team in 1981. During his single season as a Gator, he led the pitching staff with 108 innings pitched and nine complete games—including one in the SEC Tournament and another in the NCAA Tournament. He was an SEC All-Tournament selection.

== Career ==
The Detroit Tigers selected O'Neal in the first round (15th pick) of the secondary phase of the 1981 amateur draft. O'Neal played his first professional season with their Class A-Advanced Lakeland Tigers in 1981, and his last season with the Kansas City Royals' Double-A Memphis Chicks in 1991.

O'Neal made his MLB debut with the Detroit Tigers in 1984. Tigers fans will best remember his 7-inning shutout effort to earn victory against the Milwaukee Brewers on September 18, 1984, clinching the American League Eastern Division title on their way to the 1984 World's Championship. He played for the Tigers until 1986, compiling a win–loss record of 10–13 in twenty-six starts. He also pitched two complete games for the Tigers, as well as three saves in relief. After being traded by the Tigers, he became a journeyman middle reliever, playing for the Atlanta Braves, St. Louis Cardinals, Philadelphia Phillies, and San Francisco Giants in succession. He finished his seven-season MLB career having played in 142 games with a record of 17–19.

In 2025, O'Neal was awarded a World Series ring for his efforts in 1984.

== See also ==
- Florida Gators
- List of Florida Gators baseball players
