= Larry Herndon =

American baseball player and coach (born 1953)

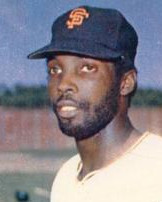
- Herndon with the San Francisco Giants
- Outfielder
- Born: November 3, 1953 (age 72); Sunflower, Mississippi, U.S.
- Batted: Right Threw: Right

MLB debut
- September 4, 1974, for the St. Louis Cardinals

Last MLB appearance
- October 2, 1988, for the Detroit Tigers

MLB statistics
- Batting average: .274
- Home runs: 107
- Runs batted in: 550
- Stats at Baseball Reference

Teams
- St. Louis Cardinals (1974); San Francisco Giants (1976–1981); Detroit Tigers (1982–1988)

Career highlights and awards
- World Series champion (1984)

Larry Darnell Herndon (born November 3, 1953), sometimes referred to by the nickname "Hondo", is an American former professional baseball outfielder and hitting coach. He played in Major League Baseball in 1974 and from 1976 to 1988.

Born in Mississippi and raised in Memphis, Tennessee, Herndon was drafted by the St. Louis Cardinals in 1971. He played for four years principally in the Cardinals' minor-league system. Herndon was traded to the San Francisco Giants in 1975. In six years with the Giants, he won the Sporting News National League Rookie of the Year award in 1976 and the Willie Mac Award in 1981.

Herndon next played for the Detroit Tigers as a left fielder from 1982 to 1988. He was a member of the 1984 Detroit Tigers team that won the American League pennant and defeated the San Diego Padres in the 1984 World Series.

After his playing career ended, Herndon was the Tigers' hitting coach from 1992 to 1998. He was later a coach for the Lakeland Flying Tigers.

== Early years ==
Herndon was born in 1953 at Sunflower, Mississippi. He was the oldest of eight children. He began playing baseball as a boy in a clearing next to the railroad tracks in Sunflower. He decided at age eight that he wanted to play major league baseball. He was raised by his grandmother, Estella.

When Herndon was in sixth grade, he moved with his grandmother to Memphis, Tennessee. He attended Douglass High School in Memphis. He played baseball for the Douglass baseball team for three years, batting .368 as a sophomore, .405 as a junior, and .413 as a senior. He was also played for the Douglass basketball team and was a sprinter on the Douglass track team.

== Professional baseball player ==
=== St. Louis Cardinals system ===
Herndon was selected by the St. Louis Cardinals in the third round of the 1971 Major League Baseball draft. He was scouted for St. Louis by Buddy Lewis who described Herndon as "excellent speed, a good arm, spray hitter, an outstanding overall athlete." Herndon signed with the Cardinals for a total of $25,000, including a $15,000 signing bonus.

He was initially assigned to the Cardinals' rookie team in the Gulf Coast League. During the 1971 season, his fellow rookie and roommate was Randy Poffo, who later became known as wrestler Randy Savage.

In 1972, Herndon split his time between the Gulf Coast League Redbirds, the Single-A Cedar Rapids Cardinals of the Midwest League, and the Single-A St. Petersburg Cardinals of the Florida State League.

Herndon spent the full 1973 season with the St. Petersburg Cardinals. Appearing in 141 games, he compiled a .287 batting average (.343 on-base percentage) and stole 41 bases.

Herndon began the 1974 season with the Arkansas Travelers of the Texas League. He appeared in 132 games, compiled a .285 batting average, and stole 50 bases. He was called up to the Cardinals in September 1974. He appeared in at least 10 games as a pinch-runner and one as a late-inning replacement. The Cardinals were reportedly grooming Herndon as a replacement for Lou Brock. In his only plate appearance, he hit a single. Used principally as a pinch-runner, he also scored three runs.

Herndon began the 1975 season with the Tulsa Oilers, the Cardinals Triple-A team in the American Association.

=== San Francisco Giants ===
On May 9, 1975, the Cardinals traded Herndon and minor-league pitcher Tony Gonzalez to the San Francisco Giants in exchange for pitcher Ron Bryant. Herndon spent the remainder of the 1975 season with the Phoenix Giants, San Francisco's Triple-A club in the Pacific Coast League. He appeared in 115 games with Phoenix in 1975, batting .269 with 17 stolen bases.

Herndon began the 1976 season in Phoenix but was quickly called up. He became the Giants' starting center fielder in 1976, appearing in 115 games, 110 of them in center field. He compiled a .288 batting average as a rookie (.337 on-base percentage) with 42 runs scored, 16 extra-base hits and 12 stolen bases. Defensively, his performance was mixed. He ranked fifth among National League outfielders with eight errors, but he also ranked third with four double plays turned. At the end of the season, The Sporting News selected Herndon for its National League Rookie of the Year award. The publication credited Herndon's "tremendous throwing arm, excellent speed and defensive maturity not often found in a first year man."

Herndon injured his leg playing winter ball after the 1976 season. He reinjured the leg in June 1977 and underwent knee surgery to repair the damage. He appeared in only 49 games during the 1977 season, and his batting average dropped to .239.

By late August 1977, Herndon claimed he was healthy and ready to play, but the team refused to activate him. Herndon checked out of the team's hotel and did not return to the team until the following spring. The San Francisco Examiner referred to him as an "AWOL outfielder" and to the incident as "The Larry Herndon Mystery". Herndon later recalled: "I was young and immature in my first few years. I came to expect certain things that didn't develop and I didn't handle it well. I let it bother me at home and at the park."

Herndon returned to form in 1978, appearing in 151 games, including 149 in center field. He compiled a .259 batting average and stole 13 bases. He also ranked fourth in the league with nine triples. Defensively, he ranked fourth among the league's outfielders with 10 errors but also ranked third with a 2.92 range factor per nine innings.

After playing exclusively in center field during his first three seasons with the Giants, Herndon lost the starting role to Bill North. Herndon divided his playing time in 1979 between center field (84 games with only 36 starts), left field (39 games), and right field (12 games).

In 1980, Herndon again shuttled between center field (84 games with 36 starts), left field (34 games), and right field (11 games). He led all National League outfielders in 1980 with 11 errors. Three of his 11 errors were committed in a single inning on September 6, 1980—a feat no National League outfielder had ever accomplished and which no major league outfielder had accomplished since 1926. At the plate, Herndon had a .258 batting average in 1980 and ranked third in the league with 11 triples.

In the strike-shortened 1981 season, Herndon became the Giants' regular left fielder, appearing in 83 of the team's 96 games (78 as the starter) at the position. Herndon also lifted weights to increase his strength and moved his feet closer together, shortening his stride at the plate. His batting average jumped to .288 (30 point higher than 1980) with eight triples and 15 stolen bases (a high during his major-league career). His error total dropped by more than half from 1980, and his range factor of 2.28 in left field ranked second in the National League. He won the 1981 Willie Mac Award for his spirit and leadership.

=== Detroit Tigers ===
1983 MLB All-Star Game program insert of Herndon for Detroit Tigers

==== Power surge in 1982 and 1983 ====
On December 9, 1981, the Giants traded Herndon to the Detroit Tigers for pitchers Mike Chris and Dan Schatzeder.

Herndon immediately became the Tigers' regular left fielder. In 1982, he appeared in a career-high 156 games at the position, including 151 as a starter and 146 complete games. His offensive production also increased in Detroit, as his batting average climbed to .292, and he had career highs with 13 triples, 23 home runs, 295 total bases, and 11 outfield assists. He ranked second in the American League in triples and eighth in hits (179). Herndon also tied a major-league record by hitting home runs in four consecutive at bats on May 17 and 18, 1982.

Herndon earned a reputation as a quiet and shy player while in Detroit. Manager Sparky Anderson in 1982 said: "I wish I had about 25 like that, with the glove, the bat, the mouth. Especially the mouth . . . Larry's a good man. Quiet. I love it. I wish I could have more of them like him." Herndon added, "Yeah, I'm quiet. I try to talk to people and answer their questions but I don't have a lot to say . . . It's hard to open up. I just want to be one of the guys . . . I go out and play the game. That's what I'm here for."

Herndon's offensive output continued at a high level in 1983. He had a career-high .302 batting average and also tallied career highs in hits (182), doubles (28) and run batted in (92). After hitting only 24 home runs in six seasons with the Giants, Herndon hit 43 home runs in his first two seasons with the Tigers (23 in 1982 and 20 in 1983). Herndon credited the power surge to steady playing time and the cozy configuration of Tiger Stadium. Defensively, his performance dropped off as he led the league’s left fielders with 15 errors.

==== World Series champions in 1984 ====
In 1984, Herndon was the starting left fielder for the Tigers team that won the American League pennant and defeated the San Diego Padres in the World Series. He got off to a slow start in 1984, leading to a decline in his playing time. He then picked up steam, batting .355 and hitting six home runs in August and September. His strong hitting continued into the 1984 post-season, as he compiled a .333 batting average and .533 slugging percentage in the 1984 World Series. In Game 1 of the World Series, he hit a two-out, two-run home run to lead the Tigers to a 3-2 victory. In the decisive Game 5, Herndon caught the final out, a fly ball to left field off the bat of Padres star Tony Gwynn. Afterward, Herndon said of Gwynn's fly ball that he "just wanted to squeeze it" and added, "This is the best feeling I've had since I've been in baseball."

==== Final years ====
Herndon's offensive production dropped off in 1985 and 1986, with batting averages of .244 and .247 and an identical .386 slugging percentage both year.

In 1987, Herndon's offensive production rebounded. He had career highs in batting average (.324), on-base percentage (.378), and slugging percentage (.520).

On October 4, during the Tigers' final regular-season game against the Toronto Blue Jays -- where If Detroit won, the Tigers would win the American League East -- Herndon hit a solo home run with one out in the second inning off of Jimmy Key. It would be the game's only run as the Tigers defeated the Blue Jays, 1–0, to win their second Division Championship in four years.

In the 1987 American League Championship Series, Herndon hit .333, and drove in two runs as the Tigers lost the series in 5 games to the Minnesota Twins.

In December 1987, The Tigers signed a five-month contract extension with Herndon. During the 1988 season, an arthritic knee limited Herndon's ability to continue to play effectively in the outfield. As a result, he appeared in only 76 games, 53 of them as the designated hitter and only 15 in left field. He compiled a career-low .224 batting average and appeared in his last major-league game on October 2, 1988.

Herndon attended spring training with the Oakland A's in 1989 but announced his retirement in March. He had undergone multiple surgeries on both knees and cited long-standing knee injuries as the reason for his retirement.

=== Career statistics ===
In 1,537 games played over 14 seasons, Herndon compiled a .274 batting average (1334-for-4877) with 605 runs, 186 doubles, 76 triples, 107 home runs, 550 RBI, 353 base on balls, a .322 on-base percentage and a .409 slugging percentage. Defensively, he posted a .972 fielding percentage at all three outfield positions. In the 1984 World Series and the 1984 and 1987 American League Championship Series he recorded a .310 average (9-for-29) with two home runs and six RBI.

== Coaching career ==
In October 1991, Herndon was hired as the Tigers' hitting coach, replacing Vada Pinson. He held that position for eight years from 1992 to 1998.

In 2005, Herndon was hired as the hitting coach for the Lakeland Flying Tigers, a Tigers minor league affiliate. He continued to hold that position in 2022.

== Personal life ==
Herndon and his wife Faye had four children. Herndon collected five hits, including a home run, on the day his son was born.
