= Bill Scherrer =

American baseball player (born 1958)

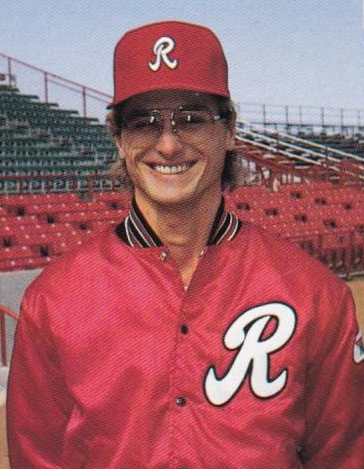
- Scherrer with the Rochester Red Wings c. 1988
- Pitcher
- Born: January 20, 1958 (age 68); Tonawanda, New York, U.S.
- Batted: Left Threw: Left

MLB debut
- September 7, 1982, for the Cincinnati Reds

Last MLB appearance
- July 28, 1988, for the Philadelphia Phillies

MLB statistics
- Win–loss record: 8–10
- Earned run average: 4.08
- Strikeouts: 207
- Stats at Baseball Reference

Teams
- Cincinnati Reds (1982–1984); Detroit Tigers (1984–1986); Cincinnati Reds (1987); Baltimore Orioles (1988); Philadelphia Phillies (1988)

Career highlights and awards
- World Series champion (1984)

William Joseph Scherrer (born January 20, 1958) is an American former professional baseball player who pitched in the Major Leagues primarily as a relief pitcher from 1982–1988. He was born in the Town of Tonawanda, New York, and graduated from Cardinal O'Hara High School there in 1976. After retirement, he moved to Grand Island, New York.

In 1984, Scherrer won his first World Series Championship as a player with the Detroit Tigers. In 1997, he won his second World Series Championship as a scout for the Florida Marlins. And in 2005, Scherrer won his third World Series Championship as a scout and special assistant to the general manager, Kenny Williams, for the Chicago White Sox.

On October 26, 2006, Scherrer was inducted into the Greater Buffalo Sports Hall of Fame.
