= Mike Laga =

American baseball player (born 1960)

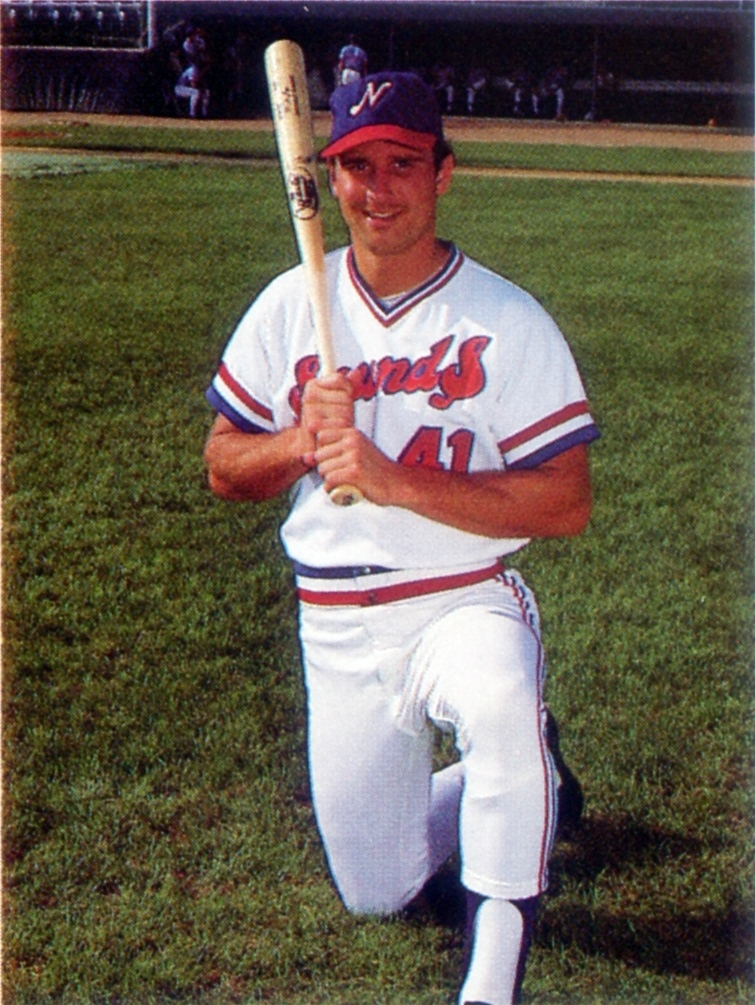
- Laga with the Nashville Sounds in 1985
- First baseman
- Born: June 14, 1960 (age 66); Ridgewood, New Jersey, U.S.
- Batted: Right Threw: Left

Professional debut
- MLB: September 1, 1982, for the Detroit Tigers
- NPB: April 7, 1991, for the Fukuoka Daiei Hawks

Last appearance
- MLB: October 3, 1990, for the San Francisco Giants
- NPB: August 1, 1992, for the Fukuoka Daiei Hawks

MLB statistics
- Batting average: .199
- Home runs: 16
- Runs batted in: 55

NPB statistics
- Batting average: .231
- Home runs: 35
- Runs batted in: 87
- Stats at Baseball Reference

Teams
- Detroit Tigers (1982–1986); St. Louis Cardinals (1986–1988); San Francisco Giants (1989–1990); Fukuoka Daiei Hawks (1991–1992)

Michael Russell Laga (born June 14, 1960) is an American former professional baseball player for the Detroit Tigers, St. Louis Cardinals and San Francisco Giants in the 1980s and 1990s. He is best known for once hitting a foul ball out of the second Busch Stadium (September 15, 1986).

Laga played for the 1984 World Series Champion Detroit Tigers, going 6–11 that year with a .545 average for the year, but did not appear in the World Series. Nor did he appear in the 1987 World Series for the St. Louis Cardinals. In his career, Laga played in 188 major league games and had 84 hits, 55 RBIs, 39 runs scored, and 16 home runs. He also hit 32 home runs in 1991, playing for Daiei of the Japanese League. He also played for the Hawks in 1992.

Laga currently lives in Florence, Massachusetts. He has three children.

Laga graduated from Ramsey High School in Ramsey, New Jersey and attended Bergen Community College.
