= 1984 Minnesota Twins season =

1984 Minnesota Twins
- League: American League
- Division: West
- Ballpark: Hubert H. Humphrey Metrodome
- City: Minneapolis, Minnesota
- Record: 81–81 (.500)
- Divisional place: 2nd
- Owners: Calvin Griffith (majority owner, with Thelma Griffith Haynes)
- General managers: Calvin Griffith
- Managers: Billy Gardner
- Television: KMSP-TV (Bob Kurtz, Ted Robinson); Spectrum (Harmon Killebrew, Dick Bremer)
- Radio: 830 WCCO AM (Herb Carneal, Joe Angel)

The 1984 Minnesota Twins season was the 24th season for the Minnesota Twins franchise in the Twin Cities of Minnesota, their 3rd season at Hubert H. Humphrey Metrodome and the 84th overall in the American League.

The team spent much of the season contending for the division title, but finished with a record of 81–81, tied for second in the American League West, and three games behind the division winner Kansas City Royals. Their 81–81 record was an 11-game improvement from 1983, and a 21-game improvement from their 102-loss season of 1982 (the third-worst record in franchise history).

1,598,692 fans attended Twins games, a Twins attendance record, but still the fifth-lowest total in the American League. Towards the end of the season, Calvin Griffith sold the club to local investor Carl Pohlad.

== Offseason ==
- October 1983: Jeff Little was released by the Twins.
- December 7, 1983: Gary Ward and Sam Sorce (minors) were traded by the Twins to the Texas Rangers for John Butcher and Mike Smithson.
- January 17, 1984: Mark Grace was drafted by the Twins in the 15th round of the 1984 Major League Baseball draft, but did not sign.

== Regular season ==
- May 4 - Oakland's Dave Kingman popped up in the fourth inning. The ball found a drainage hole in the Metrodome's roof and never returned to the playing surface. Kingman was awarded a ground-rule double. In the ninth, he hit another ball out—but this one was just into the seats.
- May 8 – Kirby Puckett got four hits in his major league debut, at Anaheim Stadium.
- June 29 – Andre David made his major league debut and started in right field for the Twins. In his first at bat in the second inning, he homered off Detroit Tigers pitcher Jack Morris to become the fourth Twin to homer in his first-ever at bat. David joined Rick Renick (1968), Dave McKay (1975) and Gary Gaetti (1981); three of the four were against Detroit pitching. In 2015, Eddie Rosario joins the list when he homers on the very first pitch he sees in the majors.
- Only one Twins player made the All-Star Game, catcher Dave Engle.
- September 28 – The Twins suffered their biggest blown lead for a loss in team history. Leading Cleveland 10–0 in the third inning, and 10–2 in the sixth, they lost the 9-inning game 11–10. In the ninth, relievers Ron Davis and Ed Hodge loaded the bases. Hodge allowed a walk-off single.

=== Offense ===
Kent Hrbek hit .311 with 27 HR and 107 RBI. Tom Brunansky hit 32 HR and 85 RBI. Leadoff batter Kirby Puckett hit .296 and scored 63 runs. Gary Gaetti hit 5 HR and 65 RBI.

=== Pitching ===
Starter Frank Viola was 18–12. Reliever Ron Davis had 29 saves. He also blew 14 saves, to tie a major league record set in 1976 and tied two other times. Mike Smithson allowed 35 homers, the most in the majors.

=== Defense ===
Gary Gaetti led the major leagues playing in 162 games. His 334 assists led all of baseball this season. Outfield teammates Kirby Puckett (center) and Tom Brunansky (right) also led the major leagues in assists.

=== Season standings ===
AL West
| Team | W | L | Pct. | GB | Home | Road |
|---|---|---|---|---|---|---|
| Kansas City Royals | 84 | 78 | .519 | — | 44‍–‍37 | 40‍–‍41 |
| California Angels | 81 | 81 | .500 | 3 | 37‍–‍44 | 44‍–‍37 |
| Minnesota Twins | 81 | 81 | .500 | 3 | 47‍–‍34 | 34‍–‍47 |
| Oakland Athletics | 77 | 85 | .475 | 7 | 44‍–‍37 | 33‍–‍48 |
| Chicago White Sox | 74 | 88 | .457 | 10 | 43‍–‍38 | 31‍–‍50 |
| Seattle Mariners | 74 | 88 | .457 | 10 | 42‍–‍39 | 32‍–‍49 |
| Texas Rangers | 69 | 92 | .429 | 14½ | 34‍–‍46 | 35‍–‍46 |

=== Record vs. opponents ===
1984 American League record Sources:
| Team | BAL | BOS | CAL | CWS | CLE | DET | KC | MIL | MIN | NYY | OAK | SEA | TEX | TOR |
|---|---|---|---|---|---|---|---|---|---|---|---|---|---|---|
| Baltimore | — | 6–7 | 8–4 | 7–5 | 7–6 | 7–6 | 5–7 | 7–6 | 5–7 | 5–8 | 6–6 | 9–3 | 9–3 | 4–9 |
| Boston | 7–6 | — | 9–3 | 7–5 | 10–3 | 7–6 | 3–9 | 9–4 | 6–6 | 7–6 | 7–5 | 4–8 | 5–7 | 5–8 |
| California | 4–8 | 3–9 | — | 8–5 | 8–4 | 4–8 | 6–7 | 8–4 | 4–9 | 8–4 | 7–6 | 9–4 | 5–8 | 7–5 |
| Chicago | 5–7 | 5–7 | 5–8 | — | 8–4 | 4–8 | 5–8 | 7–5 | 8–5 | 7–5 | 6–7 | 5–8 | 5–8 | 4–8 |
| Cleveland | 6–7 | 3–10 | 4–8 | 4–8 | — | 4–9 | 6–6 | 9–4 | 7–5 | 2–11 | 7–5 | 8–4 | 9–3 | 6–7–1 |
| Detroit | 6–7 | 6–7 | 8–4 | 8–4 | 9–4 | — | 7–5 | 11–2 | 9–3 | 7–6 | 9–3 | 6–6 | 10–2 | 8–5 |
| Kansas City | 7–5 | 9–3 | 7–6 | 8–5 | 6–6 | 5–7 | — | 6–6 | 6–7 | 5–7 | 5–8 | 9–4 | 6–7 | 5–7 |
| Milwaukee | 6–7 | 4–9 | 4–8 | 5–7 | 4–9 | 2–11 | 6–6 | — | 5–7 | 6–7 | 4–8 | 6–6 | 5–6 | 10–3 |
| Minnesota | 7–5 | 6–6 | 9–4 | 5–8 | 5–7 | 3–9 | 7–6 | 7–5 | — | 8–4 | 8–5 | 7–6 | 8–5 | 1–11 |
| New York | 8–5 | 6–7 | 4–8 | 5–7 | 11–2 | 6–7 | 7–5 | 7–6 | 4–8 | — | 8–4 | 7–5 | 6–6 | 8–5 |
| Oakland | 6–6 | 5–7 | 6–7 | 7–6 | 5–7 | 3–9 | 8–5 | 8–4 | 5–8 | 4–8 | — | 8–5 | 8–5 | 4–8 |
| Seattle | 3–9 | 8–4 | 4–9 | 8–5 | 4–8 | 6–6 | 4–9 | 6–6 | 6–7 | 5–7 | 5–8 | — | 10–3 | 5–7 |
| Texas | 3–9 | 7–5 | 8–5 | 8–5 | 3–9 | 2–10 | 7–6 | 6–5 | 5–8 | 6–6 | 5–8 | 3–10 | — | 6–6 |
| Toronto | 9–4 | 8–5 | 5–7 | 8–4 | 7–6–1 | 5–8 | 7–5 | 3–10 | 11–1 | 5–8 | 8–4 | 7–5 | 6–6 | — |

=== Notable transactions ===
- June 4, 1984: Jay Bell was drafted by the Twins in the 1st round (8th pick) of the 1984 Major League Baseball draft. Jay Bell signed on June 11, 1984.

=== Roster ===
1984 Minnesota Twins
Roster
| Pitchers: 32 John Butcher; 37 Bobby Castillo; 21 Keith Comstock; 39 Ron Davis; 23 Pete Filson; 17 Ed Hodge; 19 Rick Lysander; 33 Jack O'Connor; 19 Larry Pashnick; 18 Ken Schrom; 48 Mike Smithson; 16 Frank Viola; 30 Mike Walters; 36 Curt Wardle; 22 Len Whitehouse; 28 Albert Williams | Catchers: 20 Dave Engle; 15 Tim Laudner; 10 Jeff Reed; Infielders: 2 John Castino; 1 Alvaro Espinoza; 12 Lenny Faedo; 8 Gary Gaetti; 14 Kent Hrbek; 5 Houston Jiménez; 4 Chris Speier; 11 Tim Teufel; 38 Ron Washington | Outfielders: 26 Darrell Brown; 24 Tom Brunansky; 21 Andre David; 4 Jim Eisenreich; 31 Mike Hart; 9 Mickey Hatcher; 7 Dave Meier; 34 Kirby Puckett; Other batters: 25 Randy Bush; 31 Greg Gagne; 35 Pat Putnam | Manager: 42 Billy Gardner; Coaches: 41 Tom Kelly; 44 Jim Lemon; 46 Johnny Podres; 43 Rick Stelmaszek |

== Game log ==
=== Regular season ===
1984 regular season game log: 81–81 (Home: 47–34; Away: 34–47)
April: 11–13 (Home: 8–5; Away: 3–8)

| # | Date | Time (CT) | Opponent | Score | Win | Loss | Save | Time of Game | Attendance | Record | Box/ Streak |
|---|---|---|---|---|---|---|---|---|---|---|---|
| 1 | April 3 | 7:35 p.m. CST | Tigers | 1–8 | Morris (1–0) | **Williams** (0–1) | – | 2:10 | 34,381 | 0–1 | L1 |
| 2 | April 5 | 12:15 p.m. CST | Tigers | 3–7 | Petry (1–0) | **Viola** (0–1) | – | 2:33 | 8,373 | 0–2 | L2 |
| — | April 23 | | @ Tigers | **Postponed (Rain)** (Makeup date: April 24) | | | | | | | |
| 17 | April 24 | 4:30 p.m. CST | @ Tigers | 5–6 | Morris (4–0) | **Davis** (2–2) | – | 2:16 | N/A | 8–9 | L1 |
| 18 | April 24 | 7:21 p.m. CST | @ Tigers | 3–4 | Abbott (1–0) | **Viola** (0–3) | López (1) | 2:29 | 20,315 | 8–10 | L2 |

May: 13–12 (Home: 8–4; Away: 5–8)

| # | Date | Time (CT) | Opponent | Score | Win | Loss | Save | Time of Game | Attendance | Record | Box/ Streak |

June: 13–14 (Home: 6–7; Away: 7–7)

| # | Date | Time (CT) | Opponent | Score | Win | Loss | Save | Time of Game | Attendance | Record | Box/ Streak |
|---|---|---|---|---|---|---|---|---|---|---|---|
| 74 | June 29 | 4:35 p.m. CST | @ Tigers | 5–3 | **Williams** (3–3) | Morris (12–4) | **Davis** (15) | 2:50 | N/A | 37–37 | W1 |
| 75 | June 29 | 8:00 p.m. CDT | @ Tigers | 5–7 | Hernández (4–0) | **Filson** (4–2) | – | 3:00 | 44,619 | 37–38 | L1 |
| 76 | June 30 | 6:35 p.m. CDT | @ Tigers | 3–4 | Petry (11–3) | **Schrom** (1–3) | Hernández (14) | 2:43 | 48,095 | 37–39 | L2 |

July: 17–10 (Home: 13–6; Away: 4–4)

| # | Date | Time (CT) | Opponent | Score | Win | Loss | Save | Time of Game | Attendance | Record | Box/ Streak |
|---|---|---|---|---|---|---|---|---|---|---|---|
| 77 | July 1 | 12:30 p.m. CDT | @ Tigers | 9–0 | **Viola** (8–7) | Berenguer (4–6) | – | 2:21 | 43,484 | 38–39 | L1 |
**55th All-Star Game in San Francisco, CA**
| 85 | July 12 | 7:35 p.m. CDT | Tigers | 4–2 | **Viola** (10–7) | Petry (11–4) | **Davis** (17) | 2:18 | 29,729 | 44–41 | W2 |
| 86 | July 13 | 7:35 p.m. CDT | Tigers | 3–5 (11) | Hernández (5–0) | **Lysander** (0–1) | López (10) | 3:11 | 30,050 | 44–42 | L1 |
| 87 | July 14 | 7:35 p.m. CDT | Tigers | 5–6 (12) | Hernández (6–0) | **Walters** (0–3) | – | 3:40 | 46,017 | 44–43 | L2 |
| 88 | July 15 | 1:15 p.m. CDT | Tigers | 2–6 | Rozema (6–1) | **Schrom** (2–4) | López (11) | 3:00 | 27,965 | 44–44 | L3 |

August: 15–16 (Home: 4–7; Away: 11–9)

| # | Date | Time (CT) | Opponent | Score | Win | Loss | Save | Time of Game | Attendance | Record | Box/ Streak |

September: 12–16 (Home: 8–5; Away: 4–11)

| # | Date | Time (CT) | Opponent | Score | Win | Loss | Save | Time of Game | Attendance | Record | Box/ Streak |

Legend: = Win = Loss = Postponement
Bold = Twins team member

== Player stats ==
| = Indicates team leader |

=== Batting ===
==== Starters by position ====
Note: Pos = Position; G = Games played; AB = At bats; H = Hits; Avg. = Batting average; HR = Home runs; RBI = Runs batted in

| Pos | Player | G | AB | H | Avg. | HR | RBI |
|---|---|---|---|---|---|---|---|
| C | Dave Engle | 109 | 391 | 104 | .266 | 4 | 38 |
| 1B | Kent Hrbek | 149 | 559 | 174 | .311 | 27 | 107 |
| 2B | Tim Teufel | 157 | 568 | 149 | .262 | 14 | 61 |
| 3B | Gary Gaetti | 162 | 588 | 154 | .262 | 5 | 65 |
| SS | Houston Jiménez | 108 | 298 | 60 | .201 | 0 | 19 |
| LF | Mickey Hatcher | 152 | 576 | 174 | .302 | 5 | 69 |
| CF | Kirby Puckett | 128 | 557 | 165 | .296 | 0 | 31 |
| RF | Tom Brunansky | 155 | 567 | 144 | .254 | 32 | 85 |
| DH | Randy Bush | 113 | 311 | 69 | .222 | 11 | 43 |

==== Other batters ====
Note: G = Games played; AB = At bats; H = Hits; Avg. = Batting average; HR = Home runs; RBI = Runs batted in

| Player | G | AB | H | Avg. | HR | RBI |
|---|---|---|---|---|---|---|
| Tim Laudner | 87 | 262 | 54 | .206 | 10 | 35 |
| Darrell Brown | 95 | 260 | 71 | .273 | 1 | 19 |
| Ron Washington | 88 | 197 | 58 | .294 | 3 | 23 |
| Dave Meier | 59 | 147 | 35 | .238 | 0 | 13 |
| Lenny Faedo | 16 | 52 | 13 | .250 | 1 | 6 |
| Andre David | 33 | 48 | 12 | .250 | 1 | 5 |
| Pat Putnam | 14 | 38 | 3 | .079 | 0 | 4 |
| Chris Speier | 12 | 33 | 7 | .212 | 0 | 1 |
| Jim Eisenreich | 12 | 32 | 7 | .219 | 0 | 3 |
| Mike Hart | 13 | 29 | 5 | .172 | 0 | 5 |
| John Castino | 8 | 27 | 12 | .444 | 0 | 3 |
| Jeff Reed | 18 | 21 | 3 | .143 | 0 | 1 |
| Greg Gagne | 2 | 1 | 0 | .000 | 0 | 0 |
| Álvaro Espinoza | 1 | 0 | 0 | ---- | 0 | 0 |

=== Pitching ===
==== Starting pitchers ====
Note: G = Games pitched; IP = Innings pitched; W = Wins; L = Losses; ERA = Earned run average; SO = Strikeouts

| Player | G | IP | W | L | ERA | SO |
|---|---|---|---|---|---|---|
| Frank Viola | 35 | 257.2 | 18 | 12 | 3.21 | 149 |
| Mike Smithson | 36 | 252.0 | 15 | 13 | 3.68 | 144 |
| John Butcher | 34 | 225.0 | 13 | 11 | 3.44 | 83 |
| Ken Schrom | 25 | 137.0 | 5 | 11 | 4.47 | 49 |

==== Other pitchers ====
Note: G = Games pitched; IP = Innings pitched; W = Wins; L = Losses; ERA = Earned run average; SO = Strikeouts

| Player | G | IP | W | L | ERA | SO |
|---|---|---|---|---|---|---|
| Pete Filson | 55 | 118.2 | 6 | 5 | 4.10 | 59 |
| Ed Hodge | 25 | 100.0 | 4 | 3 | 4.77 | 59 |
| Albert Williams | 17 | 68.2 | 3 | 5 | 5.77 | 22 |
| Bobby Castillo | 10 | 25.1 | 2 | 1 | 1.78 | 7 |

==== Relief pitchers ====
Note: G = Games pitched; W = Wins; L = Losses; SV = Saves; ERA = Earned run average; SO = Strikeouts

| Player | G | W | L | SV | ERA | SO |
|---|---|---|---|---|---|---|
| Ron Davis | 64 | 7 | 11 | 29 | 4.55 | 74 |
| Rick Lysander | 36 | 4 | 3 | 5 | 3.49 | 22 |
| Len Whitehouse | 30 | 2 | 2 | 1 | 3.16 | 18 |
| Mike Walters | 23 | 0 | 3 | 2 | 3.72 | 10 |
| Larry Pashnick | 13 | 2 | 1 | 0 | 3.52 | 10 |
| Keith Comstock | 4 | 0 | 0 | 0 | 8.53 | 2 |
| Jack O'Connor | 2 | 0 | 0 | 0 | 1.93 | 0 |
| Curt Wardle | 2 | 0 | 0 | 0 | 4.50 | 5 |

== Awards and honors ==
All-Star Game

- Dave Engle, reserve

== Farm system ==
| Level | Team | League | Manager |
|---|---|---|---|
| AAA | Toledo Mud Hens | International League | Cal Ermer |
| AA | Orlando Twins | Southern League | Charlie Manuel |
| A | Visalia Oaks | California League | Dave Hilton |
| A | Kenosha Twins | Midwest League | Duffy Dyer |
| Rookie | Elizabethton Twins | Appalachian League | Fred Waters |

LEAGUE CHAMPIONS: Elizabethton
