= 1984 New York Yankees season =

Season for the Major League Baseball team the New York Yankees

1984 New York Yankees
- League: American League
- Division: East
- Ballpark: Yankee Stadium
- City: New York City
- Record: 87-75 (.537)
- Owners: George Steinbrenner
- General managers: Murray Cook, Clyde King
- Managers: Yogi Berra
- Television: WPIX (Phil Rizzuto, Frank Messer, Bill White, Bobby Murcer); SportsChannel NY (Mel Allen and others from WPIX)
- Radio: WABC (AM) (Frank Messer, Phil Rizzuto, Bill White, John Gordon, Bobby Murcer)

The 1984 New York Yankees season was the 82nd season for the Yankees. The team finished in third place in the American League Eastern Division with a record of 87–75, finishing 17 games behind the Detroit Tigers. New York was managed by Yogi Berra. The Yankees played at Yankee Stadium.

== Offseason ==
- November 9, 1983: Rowland Office was released by the Yankees.
- November 22, 1983: Amalio Carreno was signed by the New York Yankees as an amateur free agent.
- December 8, 1983: Steve Balboni and Roger Erickson were traded by the Yankees to the Kansas City Royals for Mike Armstrong and Duane Dewey (minors).
- December 19, 1983: Mike Browning (minors) was traded by the Yankees to the California Angels for Curt Brown.
- January 17, 1984: Tim Belcher was drafted by the Yankees in the 1st round (1st pick) of the 1984 Major League Baseball draft (secondary phase). Player signed February 2, 1984.
- February 5, 1984: Otis Nixon, George Frazier and a player to be named later were traded by the Yankees to the Cleveland Indians for Toby Harrah and a player to be named later. On February 8, the deal was completed, as the Indians sent Rick Browne (minors) to the Yankees, and the Yankees sent Guy Elston (minors) to the Indians.
- February 8, 1984: Tim Belcher was chosen from the Yankees by the Oakland Athletics from the Yankees as a free agent compensation pick.
- March 30, 1984: Graig Nettles was traded by the Yankees to the San Diego Padres for Dennis Rasmussen and a player to be named later. The Padres completed the deal by sending Darin Cloninger (minors) to the Yankees on April 26.

== Regular season ==
- Dave Winfield was the runner up to Don Mattingly for the American League batting title.

=== Season standings ===
AL East
| Team | W | L | Pct. | GB | Home | Road |
|---|---|---|---|---|---|---|
| Detroit Tigers | 104 | 58 | .642 | — | 53‍–‍29 | 51‍–‍29 |
| Toronto Blue Jays | 89 | 73 | .549 | 15 | 49‍–‍32 | 40‍–‍41 |
| New York Yankees | 87 | 75 | .537 | 17 | 51‍–‍30 | 36‍–‍45 |
| Boston Red Sox | 86 | 76 | .531 | 18 | 41‍–‍40 | 45‍–‍36 |
| Baltimore Orioles | 85 | 77 | .525 | 19 | 44‍–‍37 | 41‍–‍40 |
| Cleveland Indians | 75 | 87 | .463 | 29 | 41‍–‍39 | 34‍–‍48 |
| Milwaukee Brewers | 67 | 94 | .416 | 36½ | 38‍–‍43 | 29‍–‍51 |

=== Record vs. opponents ===
1984 American League record Sources:
| Team | BAL | BOS | CAL | CWS | CLE | DET | KC | MIL | MIN | NYY | OAK | SEA | TEX | TOR |
|---|---|---|---|---|---|---|---|---|---|---|---|---|---|---|
| Baltimore | — | 6–7 | 8–4 | 7–5 | 7–6 | 7–6 | 5–7 | 7–6 | 5–7 | 5–8 | 6–6 | 9–3 | 9–3 | 4–9 |
| Boston | 7–6 | — | 9–3 | 7–5 | 10–3 | 7–6 | 3–9 | 9–4 | 6–6 | 7–6 | 7–5 | 4–8 | 5–7 | 5–8 |
| California | 4–8 | 3–9 | — | 8–5 | 8–4 | 4–8 | 6–7 | 8–4 | 4–9 | 8–4 | 7–6 | 9–4 | 5–8 | 7–5 |
| Chicago | 5–7 | 5–7 | 5–8 | — | 8–4 | 4–8 | 5–8 | 7–5 | 8–5 | 7–5 | 6–7 | 5–8 | 5–8 | 4–8 |
| Cleveland | 6–7 | 3–10 | 4–8 | 4–8 | — | 4–9 | 6–6 | 9–4 | 7–5 | 2–11 | 7–5 | 8–4 | 9–3 | 6–7–1 |
| Detroit | 6–7 | 6–7 | 8–4 | 8–4 | 9–4 | — | 7–5 | 11–2 | 9–3 | 7–6 | 9–3 | 6–6 | 10–2 | 8–5 |
| Kansas City | 7–5 | 9–3 | 7–6 | 8–5 | 6–6 | 5–7 | — | 6–6 | 6–7 | 5–7 | 5–8 | 9–4 | 6–7 | 5–7 |
| Milwaukee | 6–7 | 4–9 | 4–8 | 5–7 | 4–9 | 2–11 | 6–6 | — | 5–7 | 6–7 | 4–8 | 6–6 | 5–6 | 10–3 |
| Minnesota | 7–5 | 6–6 | 9–4 | 5–8 | 5–7 | 3–9 | 7–6 | 7–5 | — | 8–4 | 8–5 | 7–6 | 8–5 | 1–11 |
| New York | 8–5 | 6–7 | 4–8 | 5–7 | 11–2 | 6–7 | 7–5 | 7–6 | 4–8 | — | 8–4 | 7–5 | 6–6 | 8–5 |
| Oakland | 6–6 | 5–7 | 6–7 | 7–6 | 5–7 | 3–9 | 8–5 | 8–4 | 5–8 | 4–8 | — | 8–5 | 8–5 | 4–8 |
| Seattle | 3–9 | 8–4 | 4–9 | 8–5 | 4–8 | 6–6 | 4–9 | 6–6 | 6–7 | 5–7 | 5–8 | — | 10–3 | 5–7 |
| Texas | 3–9 | 7–5 | 8–5 | 8–5 | 3–9 | 2–10 | 7–6 | 6–5 | 5–8 | 6–6 | 5–8 | 3–10 | — | 6–6 |
| Toronto | 9–4 | 8–5 | 5–7 | 8–4 | 7–6–1 | 5–8 | 7–5 | 3–10 | 11–1 | 5–8 | 8–4 | 7–5 | 6–6 | — |

=== Notable transactions ===
- April 17, 1984: Oscar Gamble was signed as a free agent by the Yankees.
- July 18, 1984: Roy Smalley was traded by the Yankees to the Chicago White Sox for players to be named later. The White Sox completed the deal by sending Doug Drabek and Kevin Hickey to the Yankees on August 13.

=== Roster ===
1984 New York Yankees
Roster
| Pitchers: 36 Mike Armstrong; 56 Curt Brown; 53 Marty Bystrom; 67 Clay Christiansen; 41 Joe Cowley; 66 Jim Deshaies; 47 Ray Fontenot; 49 Ron Guidry; 50 Jay Howell; 24 John Montefusco; 48 Dale Murray; 35 Phil Niekro; 45 Dennis Rasmussen; 26 Shane Rawley; 19 Dave Righetti; 38 José Rijo; 29 Bob Shirley | Catchers: 10 Rick Cerone; 58 Mike O'Berry; 27 Butch Wynegar; Infielders: 2 Tim Foli; 11 Toby Harrah; 56 Rex Hudler; 23 Don Mattingly; 20 Bob Meacham; 46 Mike Pagliarulo; 30 Willie Randolph; 18 Andre Robertson; 12 Roy Smalley; 20 Keith Smith | Outfielders: 34 Scott Bradley; 62 Brian Dayett; 33 Ken Griffey; 55 Stan Javier; 21 Steve Kemp; 55 Víctor Mata; 22 Omar Moreno; 14 Lou Piniella; 31 Dave Winfield; Other batters: 25 Don Baylor; 17 Oscar Gamble | Manager: 8 Yogi Berra; Coaches: 52 Mark Connor (Pitching); 41 Sammy Ellis (Pitching); 42 Doug Holmquist (First Base); 42 Jerry McNertney (Bullpen); 40 Gene Michael (Third Base); 14 Lou Piniella (Hitting); 51 Dom Scala (Bullpen); 43,44 Jeff Torborg (Bullpen); 6 Roy White (First Base) |

== Game log ==
=== Regular season ===
1984 regular season game log: 87–75 (home: 51–30; Away: 36–45)
April: 8–13 (home: 5–6; Away: 3–7)

| # | Date | Time (ET) | Opponent | Score | Win | Loss | Save | Time of Game | Attendance | Record | Box/ Streak | GB |

May: 12–14 (home: 7–5; Away: 5–9)

| # | Date | Time (ET) | Opponent | Score | Win | Loss | Save | Time of Game | Attendance | Record | Box/ Streak | GB |

June: 13–14 (home: 7–5; Away: 6–9)

| # | Date | Time (ET) | Opponent | Score | Win | Loss | Save | Time of Game | Attendance | Record | Box/ Streak | GB |

July: 17–11 (home: 11–3; Away: 6–8)

| # | Date | Time (ET) | Opponent | Score | Win | Loss | Save | Time of Game | Attendance | Record | Box/ Streak | GB |
|---|---|---|---|---|---|---|---|---|---|---|---|---|
| – | July 10 | | **1984 Major League Baseball All-Star Game** at Candlestick Park in San Francisco | | | | | | | | | |

August: 21–10 (home: 13–6; Away: 8–4)

| # | Date | Time (ET) | Opponent | Score | Win | Loss | Save | Time of Game | Attendance | Record | Box/ Streak | GB |

September: 16–13 (home: 8–5; Away: 8–8)

| # | Date | Time (ET) | Opponent | Score | Win | Loss | Save | Time of Game | Attendance | Record | Box/ Streak | GB |

Legend: = Win = Loss = Postponement
Bold = Yankees team member

== Player stats ==
| = Indicates team leader |

| = Indicates league leader |

=== Batting ===
==== Starters by position ====
Note: Pos = Position; G = Games played; AB = At bats; H = Hits; Avg. = Batting average; HR = Home runs; RBI = Runs batted in

| Pos | Player | G | AB | H | Avg. | HR | RBI |
|---|---|---|---|---|---|---|---|
| C | Butch Wynegar | 129 | 442 | 118 | .267 | 6 | 45 |
| 1B | Don Mattingly | 153 | 603 | 207 | .343 | 23 | 110 |
| 2B | Willie Randolph | 142 | 564 | 162 | .287 | 2 | 31 |
| SS | Bobby Meacham | 99 | 360 | 91 | .253 | 2 | 25 |
| 3B | Toby Harrah | 88 | 253 | 55 | .217 | 1 | 26 |
| LF | Steve Kemp | 94 | 313 | 91 | .291 | 7 | 41 |
| CF | Omar Moreno | 117 | 355 | 92 | .259 | 4 | 38 |
| RF | Dave Winfield | 141 | 567 | 193 | .340 | 19 | 100 |
| DH | Don Baylor | 134 | 493 | 129 | .262 | 27 | 89 |

==== Other batters ====
Note: G = Games played; AB = At bats; H = Hits; Avg. = Batting average; HR = Home runs; RBI = Runs batted in

| Player | G | AB | H | Avg. | HR | RBI |
|---|---|---|---|---|---|---|
| Ken Griffey Sr. | 120 | 399 | 109 | .273 | 7 | 56 |
| Roy Smalley III | 67 | 209 | 50 | .239 | 7 | 26 |
| Mike Pagliarulo | 67 | 201 | 48 | .239 | 7 | 34 |
| Tim Foli | 61 | 163 | 41 | .252 | 0 | 16 |
| Andre Robertson | 52 | 140 | 30 | .214 | 0 | 6 |
| Brian Dayett | 64 | 127 | 31 | .244 | 4 | 23 |
| Oscar Gamble | 54 | 125 | 23 | .184 | 10 | 27 |
| Rick Cerone | 38 | 120 | 25 | .208 | 2 | 13 |
| Lou Piniella | 29 | 86 | 26 | .302 | 1 | 6 |
| Victor Mata | 30 | 70 | 23 | .329 | 1 | 6 |
| Mike O'Berry | 13 | 32 | 8 | .250 | 0 | 5 |
| Scott Bradley | 9 | 21 | 6 | .286 | 0 | 2 |
| Rex Hudler | 9 | 7 | 1 | .143 | 0 | 0 |
| Stan Javier | 7 | 7 | 1 | .143 | 0 | 0 |
| Keith Smith | 2 | 4 | 0 | .000 | 0 | 0 |

=== Pitching ===
==== Starting pitchers ====
Note: G = Games pitched; IP = Innings pitched; W = Wins; L = Losses; ERA = Earned run average; SO = Strikeouts

| Player | G | IP | W | L | ERA | SO |
|---|---|---|---|---|---|---|
| Phil Niekro | 32 | 215.2 | 16 | 8 | 3.09 | 136 |
| Ron Guidry | 29 | 195.2 | 10 | 11 | 4.51 | 127 |
| Ray Fontenot | 35 | 169.1 | 8 | 9 | 3.61 | 85 |
| Dennis Rasmussen | 24 | 147.2 | 9 | 6 | 4.57 | 110 |
| Joe Cowley | 16 | 83.1 | 9 | 2 | 3.56 | 71 |
| John Montefusco | 11 | 55.1 | 5 | 3 | 3.58 | 23 |
| Shane Rawley | 11 | 42.0 | 2 | 3 | 6.21 | 24 |
| Marty Bystrom | 7 | 39.1 | 2 | 2 | 2.97 | 24 |
| Jim Deshaies | 2 | 7.0 | 0 | 1 | 11.57 | 5 |

==== Other pitchers ====
Note: G = Games pitched; IP = Innings pitched; W = Wins; L = Losses; ERA = Earned run average; SO = Strikeouts

| Player | G | IP | W | L | ERA | SO |
|---|---|---|---|---|---|---|
| Bob Shirley | 41 | 114.1 | 3 | 3 | 3.38 | 48 |
| José Rijo | 24 | 62.1 | 2 | 8 | 4.76 | 47 |

==== Relief pitchers ====
Note: G = Games pitched; W = Wins; L = Losses; SV = Saves; ERA = Earned run average; SO = Strikeouts

| Player | G | W | L | SV | ERA | SO |
|---|---|---|---|---|---|---|
| Dave Righetti | 64 | 5 | 6 | 31 | 2.34 | 90 |
| Jay Howell | 61 | 9 | 4 | 7 | 2.69 | 109 |
| Mike Armstrong | 36 | 3 | 2 | 1 | 3.48 | 43 |
| Clay Christiansen | 24 | 2 | 4 | 2 | 6.05 | 27 |
| Dale Murray | 19 | 1 | 2 | 0 | 4.94 | 13 |
| Curt Brown | 13 | 1 | 1 | 0 | 2.70 | 10 |

== Awards and honors ==
- Ron Guidry, Pitcher, Gold Glove
- Ron Guidry, Roberto Clemente Award
- Dave Winfield, Outfield, Silver Slugger Award
- Dave Winfield, Outfield, Gold Glove

All-Star Game

- Don Mattingly
- Dave Winfield
- Phil Niekro

=== League leaders ===
- Don Mattingly – American League batting champion (.343)
- Don Mattingly – American League leader, hits (207)

== Farm system ==
| Level | Team | League | Manager |
|---|---|---|---|
| AAA | Columbus Clippers | International League | Stump Merrill |
| AA | Nashville Sounds | Southern League | Jim Marshall |
| A | Fort Lauderdale Yankees | Florida State League | Barry Foote |
| A | Greensboro Hornets | South Atlantic League | Carlos Tosca |
| A-Short Season | Oneonta Yankees | New York–Penn League | Bill Livesey |
| Rookie | GCL Yankees | Gulf Coast League | Jack Gillis |

LEAGUE CHAMPIONS: Fort Lauderdale
