= 1984 California Angels season =

Major League Baseball season

1984 California Angels
- League: American League
- Division: West
- Ballpark: Anaheim Stadium
- City: Anaheim, California
- Record: 81–81 (.500)
- Divisional place: 2nd
- Owner: Gene Autry
- General managers: Buzzie Bavasi, Mike Port
- Manager: John McNamara
- Television: KTLA (Geoff Witcher, Joe Buttitta); ONTV
- Radio: KMPC (Ron Fairly, Bob Starr, Al Conin); KLVE (Cookie Rojas, Ulpiano Cos Villa)
- Stats: ESPN.com; Baseball Reference

The 1984 California Angels season was the 24th season of the California Angels franchise in the American League, the 19th in Anaheim, and their 19th season playing their home games at Anaheim Stadium. The Angels finished second in the American League west with a record of 81 wins and 81 losses.

== Offseason ==
- November 22, 1983: Rod Carew was signed as a free agent with the California Angels.
- December 19, 1983: Curt Brown was traded by the Angels to the New York Yankees for Mike Browning (minors).
- February 6, 1984: Rob Picciolo was signed as a free agent with the California Angels.

== Regular season ==
- September 17, 1984: In a game against the Kansas City Royals, Reggie Jackson hit the 500th home run of his career. It was the 17th anniversary of the day he hit his first home run. Jackson hit his 500th, at Anaheim Stadium off Bud Black of the Royals.
- September 30, 1984: Mike Witt throws a perfect game against the Texas Rangers, recording the only perfect game in franchise history.

=== Season standings ===
AL West
Team	W	L	Pct.	GB	Home	Road
Kansas City Royals	84	78	.519	—	44‍–‍37	40‍–‍41
California Angels	81	81	.500	3	37‍–‍44	44‍–‍37
Minnesota Twins	81	81	.500	3	47‍–‍34	34‍–‍47
Oakland Athletics	77	85	.475	7	44‍–‍37	33‍–‍48
Chicago White Sox	74	88	.457	10	43‍–‍38	31‍–‍50
Seattle Mariners	74	88	.457	10	42‍–‍39	32‍–‍49
Texas Rangers	69	92	.429	14½	34‍–‍46	35‍–‍46

=== Record vs. opponents ===
1984 American League record Sources:
Team	BAL	BOS	CAL	CWS	CLE	DET	KC	MIL	MIN	NYY	OAK	SEA	TEX	TOR
Baltimore	—	6–7	8–4	7–5	7–6	7–6	5–7	7–6	5–7	5–8	6–6	9–3	9–3	4–9
Boston	7–6	—	9–3	7–5	10–3	7–6	3–9	9–4	6–6	7–6	7–5	4–8	5–7	5–8
California	4–8	3–9	—	8–5	8–4	4–8	6–7	8–4	4–9	8–4	7–6	9–4	5–8	7–5
Chicago	5–7	5–7	5–8	—	8–4	4–8	5–8	7–5	8–5	7–5	6–7	5–8	5–8	4–8
Cleveland	6–7	3–10	4–8	4–8	—	4–9	6–6	9–4	7–5	2–11	7–5	8–4	9–3	6–7–1
Detroit	6–7	6–7	8–4	8–4	9–4	—	7–5	11–2	9–3	7–6	9–3	6–6	10–2	8–5
Kansas City	7–5	9–3	7–6	8–5	6–6	5–7	—	6–6	6–7	5–7	5–8	9–4	6–7	5–7
Milwaukee	6–7	4–9	4–8	5–7	4–9	2–11	6–6	—	5–7	6–7	4–8	6–6	5–6	10–3
Minnesota	7–5	6–6	9–4	5–8	5–7	3–9	7–6	7–5	—	8–4	8–5	7–6	8–5	1–11
New York	8–5	6–7	4–8	5–7	11–2	6–7	7–5	7–6	4–8	—	8–4	7–5	6–6	8–5
Oakland	6–6	5–7	6–7	7–6	5–7	3–9	8–5	8–4	5–8	4–8	—	8–5	8–5	4–8
Seattle	3–9	8–4	4–9	8–5	4–8	6–6	4–9	6–6	6–7	5–7	5–8	—	10–3	5–7
Texas	3–9	7–5	8–5	8–5	3–9	2–10	7–6	6–5	5–8	6–6	5–8	3–10	—	6–6
Toronto	9–4	8–5	5–7	8–4	7–6–1	5–8	7–5	3–10	11–1	5–8	8–4	7–5	6–6	—

=== Transactions ===
- June 4, 1984: Dante Bichette was drafted by the Angels in the 17th round of the 1984 Major League Baseball draft. Player signed June 8, 1984.
- August 2, 1984: Ron Jackson was released by the California Angels.

=== Roster ===
1984 California Angels
Roster
Pitchers: 46 Don Aase; 36 Steve Brown; 63 Stew Cliburn; 23 Doug Corbett; 16 John Curtis; 43 Ken Forsch; 25 Tommy John; 48 Curt Kaufman; 24 Bruce Kison; 31 Frank LaCorte; 37 Ron Romanick; 40 Luis Sánchez; 41,47 Jim Slaton; 35 Dave Smith; 42 Rick Steirer; 27 Craig Swan; 39 Mike Witt; 38 Geoff Zahn	Catchers: 8 Bob Boone; 34 Jerry Narron; Infielders: 29 Rod Carew; 11 Doug DeCinces; 4 Bobby Grich; 15 Ron Jackson; 32 Darrell Miller; 10 Rob Picciolo; 22,30 Dick Schofield; 6 Daryl Sconiers; 9 Rob Wilfong	Outfielders: 12 Juan Beníquez; 3 Mike Brown; 5 Brian Downing; 19 Fred Lynn; 20 Gary Pettis; 15,30 Derrel Thomas; Other batters: 7 Rick Burleson; 44 Reggie Jackson	Manager: 2 John McNamara; Coaches: 49 Bob Clear; 18 Preston Gómez; 1 Bobby Knoop; 51 Marcel Lachemann; 50 Jimmie Reese

== Game log ==
=== Regular season ===
1984 regular season game log: 81–81 (Home: 37–44; Away: 44–37)
April: 15–11 (Home: 7–6; Away: 8–5)

#	Date	Time (PT)	Opponent	Score	Win	Loss	Save	Time of Game	Attendance	Record	Box/ Streak

May: 11–14 (Home: 4–10; Away: 7–4)

#	Date	Time (PT)	Opponent	Score	Win	Loss	Save	Time of Game	Attendance	Record	Box/ Streak
35	May 11	4:35 p.m. PDT	@ Tigers	2–8	Wilcox (4–0)	**Witt** (4–2)	Hernández (4)	2:55	44,187	18–17	L5
38	May 12	10:20 a.m. PDT	@ Tigers	4–2	**John** (3–3)	Berenguer (2–2)	–	2:32	38,516	19–17	W1
—	May 13		@ Tigers	**Postponed (Rain)** (Makeup date: August 14)							
43	May 22	7:30 p.m. PDT	Tigers	1–3	Berenguer (3–2)	**Witt** (4–4)	López (6)	2:53	41,253	23–20	L1
44	May 23	7:30 p.m. PDT	Tigers	2–4	Petry (7–1)	**LaCorte** (0–2)	Hernández (7)	2:39	41,205	23–21	L2
45	May 24	7:30 p.m. PDT	Tigers	1–5	Morris (9–1)	**Slaton** (1–2)	–	2:14	43,580	23–22	L3

June: 15–12 (Home: 5–7; Away: 10–5)

#	Date	Time (PT)	Opponent	Score	Win	Loss	Save	Time of Game	Attendance	Record	Box/ Streak

July: 12–14 (Home: 7–6; Away: 5–8)

#	Date	Time (PT)	Opponent	Score	Win	Loss	Save	Time of Game	Attendance	Record	Box/ Streak
**55th All-Star Game in San Francisco, CA**

August: 13–16 (Home: 7–8; Away: 6–8)

#	Date	Time (PT)	Opponent	Score	Win	Loss	Save	Time of Game	Attendance	Record	Box/ Streak
117	August 14	2:35 p.m. PDT	@ Tigers	6–4	**Aase** (2–1)	Hernández (6–2)	**Sánchez** (11)	2:53	N/A	60–57	W2
118	August 14	6:03 p.m. PDT	@ Tigers	12–1	**Kison** (3–1)	Rozema (7–4)	–	2:33	38,597	61–57	W3
119	August 15	4:35 p.m. PDT	@ Tigers	3–8	Petry (15–5)	**John** (7–10)	–	2:46	33,940	61–58	L1
120	August 16	10:30 a.m. PDT	@ Tigers	7–8 (12)	Hernández (7–2)	**Curtis** (0–1)	–	4:02	37,779	61–59	L2
127	August 24	7:30 p.m. PDT	Tigers	5–3	**Witt** (12–10)	Petry (15–7)	**Aase** (4)	2:33	41,459	63–64	W2
128	August 25	7:00 p.m. PDT	Tigers	1–5	Morris (17–8)	**Kison** (3–3)	–	2:40	51,203	63–65	L1
129	August 26	1:00 p.m. PDT	Tigers	12–6	Wilcox (15–7)	**John** (7–12)	–	3:01	33,008	63–66	L2

September: 15–14 (Home: 8–7; Away: 7–7)

#	Date	Time (PT)	Opponent	Score	Win	Loss	Save	Time of Game	Attendance	Record	Box/ Streak

Legend: = Win = Loss = Postponement
Bold = Angels team member

== Player stats ==
=== Batting ===
==== Starters by position ====
Note: Pos = Position; G = Games played; AB = At bats; H = Hits; Avg. = Batting average; HR = Home runs; RBI = Runs batted in

Pos	Player	G	AB	H	Avg.	HR	RBI
C	Bob Boone	139	450	91	.202	3	32
1B	Rod Carew	93	329	97	.295	3	31
2B	Bobby Grich	116	363	93	.256	18	58
SS	Dick Schofield	140	400	77	.193	4	21
3B	Doug DeCinces	146	547	147	.269	20	82
LF	Brian Downing	156	539	148	.275	23	91
CF	Gary Pettis	140	397	90	.227	2	29
RF	Fred Lynn	142	517	140	.271	23	79
DH	Reggie Jackson	143	525	117	.223	25	81

==== Other batters ====
Note: G = Games played; AB = At bats; H = Hits; Avg. = Batting average; HR = Home runs; RBI = Runs batted in

Player	G	AB	H	Avg.	HR	RBI
Juan Beníquez	110	354	119	.336	8	39
Rob Wilfong	108	307	76	.248	6	33
Daryl Sconiers	57	160	39	.244	4	17
Jerry Narron	69	150	37	.247	3	17
Mike Brown	62	148	42	.284	7	22
Rob Picciolo	87	119	24	.202	1	9
Ron Jackson	33	91	15	.165	0	5
Darrell Miller	17	41	7	.171	0	1
Derrel Thomas	14	29	4	.138	0	2
Rick Burleson	7	4	0	.000	0	0

=== Pitching ===
==== Starting pitchers ====
Note: G = Games pitched; IP = Innings pitched; W = Wins; L = Losses; ERA = Earned run average; SO = Strikeouts

Player	G	IP	W	L	ERA	SO
Mike Witt	34	246.2	15	11	3.47	196
Ron Romanick	33	229.2	12	12	3.76	87
Geoff Zahn	28	199.1	13	10	3.12	61
Tommy John	32	181.1	7	13	4.52	47
Jim Slaton	32	163.0	7	10	4.97	67
Ken Forsch	2	16.1	1	1	2.20	10
Steve Brown	3	11.0	0	1	9.00	5
Rick Steirer	1	2.2	0	1	16.88	2

==== Other pitchers ====
Note: G = Games pitched; IP = Innings pitched; W = Wins; L = Losses; ERA = Earned run average; SO = Strikeouts

Player	G	IP	W	L	ERA	SO
Bruce Kison	20	65.1	4	5	5.37	66
Craig Swan	2	5.0	0	1	10.80	2

==== Relief pitchers ====
Note: G = Games pitched; W = Wins; L = Losses; SV = Saves; ERA = Earned run average; SO = Strikeouts

Player	G	W	L	SV	ERA	SO
Luis Sánchez	49	9	7	11	3.33	62
Doug Corbett	45	5	1	4	2.12	48
Curt Kaufman	29	2	3	1	4.57	41
Don Aase	23	4	1	8	1.62	28
John Curtis	17	1	2	0	4.40	18
Frank LaCorte	13	1	2	0	7.06	13
Stew Cliburn	1	0	0	0	13.50	1
Dave Smith	1	0	0	0	18.00	0

== Farm system ==
Level	Team	League	Manager
AAA	Edmonton Trappers	Pacific Coast League	Moose Stubing
AA	Waterbury Angels	Eastern League	Winston Llenas
A	Redwood Pioneers	California League	Tom Kotchman
A	Peoria Suns	Midwest League	Joe Maddon
A-Short Season	Salem Angels	Northwest League	Larry Patterson

LEAGUE CHAMPIONS: Edmonton

Records
Preceded by 1983	California Angels seasons 1984	Succeeded by 1985
