= 1984 Texas Rangers season =

1984 Texas Rangers
- League: American League
- Division: West
- Ballpark: Arlington Stadium
- City: Arlington, Texas
- Record: 69–92 (.429)
- Divisional place: 7th
- Owners: Eddie Chiles
- General managers: Joe Klein, Tom Grieve
- Managers: Doug Rader
- Television: KXAS-TV; HSE (Eric Nadel, Steve Busby, Merle Harmon)
- Radio: WBAP (Eric Nadel, Mark Holtz )

The 1984 Texas Rangers season was the 24th of the Texas Rangers franchise overall, their 13th in Arlington as the Rangers, and the 13th season at Arlington Stadium. The Rangers finished seventh in the American League West, with a record of 69 wins and 92 losses.

== Offseason ==
- November 21, 1983: Marv Foley was signed as a free agent by the Rangers.
- December 7, 1983: John Butcher and Mike Smithson were traded by the Rangers to the Minnesota Twins for Gary Ward and Sam Sorce (minors).
- December 8, 1983: Jim Sundberg was traded by the Rangers to the Milwaukee Brewers for Ned Yost and Dan Scarpetta (minors).
- January 17, 1984: Gordon Dillard was drafted by the Rangers in the 2nd round of the 1984 Major League Baseball draft, but did not sign.
- January 27, 1984: Tommy Boggs was signed as a free agent by the Rangers.

== Regular season ==
- May 6, 1984: Cal Ripken Jr. of the Baltimore Orioles hit for the cycle in a game against the Rangers.

=== Season standings ===
AL West
Team	W	L	Pct.	GB	Home	Road
Kansas City Royals	84	78	.519	—	44‍–‍37	40‍–‍41
California Angels	81	81	.500	3	37‍–‍44	44‍–‍37
Minnesota Twins	81	81	.500	3	47‍–‍34	34‍–‍47
Oakland Athletics	77	85	.475	7	44‍–‍37	33‍–‍48
Chicago White Sox	74	88	.457	10	43‍–‍38	31‍–‍50
Seattle Mariners	74	88	.457	10	42‍–‍39	32‍–‍49
Texas Rangers	69	92	.429	14½	34‍–‍46	35‍–‍46

=== Record vs. opponents ===
1984 American League record Sources:
Team	BAL	BOS	CAL	CWS	CLE	DET	KC	MIL	MIN	NYY	OAK	SEA	TEX	TOR
Baltimore	—	6–7	8–4	7–5	7–6	7–6	5–7	7–6	5–7	5–8	6–6	9–3	9–3	4–9
Boston	7–6	—	9–3	7–5	10–3	7–6	3–9	9–4	6–6	7–6	7–5	4–8	5–7	5–8
California	4–8	3–9	—	8–5	8–4	4–8	6–7	8–4	4–9	8–4	7–6	9–4	5–8	7–5
Chicago	5–7	5–7	5–8	—	8–4	4–8	5–8	7–5	8–5	7–5	6–7	5–8	5–8	4–8
Cleveland	6–7	3–10	4–8	4–8	—	4–9	6–6	9–4	7–5	2–11	7–5	8–4	9–3	6–7–1
Detroit	6–7	6–7	8–4	8–4	9–4	—	7–5	11–2	9–3	7–6	9–3	6–6	10–2	8–5
Kansas City	7–5	9–3	7–6	8–5	6–6	5–7	—	6–6	6–7	5–7	5–8	9–4	6–7	5–7
Milwaukee	6–7	4–9	4–8	5–7	4–9	2–11	6–6	—	5–7	6–7	4–8	6–6	5–6	10–3
Minnesota	7–5	6–6	9–4	5–8	5–7	3–9	7–6	7–5	—	8–4	8–5	7–6	8–5	1–11
New York	8–5	6–7	4–8	5–7	11–2	6–7	7–5	7–6	4–8	—	8–4	7–5	6–6	8–5
Oakland	6–6	5–7	6–7	7–6	5–7	3–9	8–5	8–4	5–8	4–8	—	8–5	8–5	4–8
Seattle	3–9	8–4	4–9	8–5	4–8	6–6	4–9	6–6	6–7	5–7	5–8	—	10–3	5–7
Texas	3–9	7–5	8–5	8–5	3–9	2–10	7–6	6–5	5–8	6–6	5–8	3–10	—	6–6
Toronto	9–4	8–5	5–7	8–4	7–6–1	5–8	7–5	3–10	11–1	5–8	8–4	7–5	6–6	—

=== Notable transactions ===
- May 25, 1984: Mike Richardt was traded by the Rangers to the Houston Astros for Alan Bannister.
- July 2, 1984: The Rangers traded players to be named later to the Chicago Cubs for Dickie Noles. The Rangers completed the deal by sending Tim Henry (minors) and Jorge Gomez (minors) to the Cubs on December 11.

=== Roster ===
1984 Texas Rangers roster
Roster
Pitchers: 22 Jim Bibby; 44 Danny Darwin; 35 Tom Henke; 45 Dwayne Henry; 49 Charlie Hough; 21 Odell Jones; 16 Mike Mason; 53 Joey McLaughlin; 36 Dickie Noles; 24 Dave Schmidt; 31 Dave Stewart; 28 Frank Tanana; 41 Dave Tobik; 38 Ricky Wright	Catchers: 30 Marv Foley; 43 Donnie Scott; 7,10 Ned Yost; Infielders: 14 Jim Anderson; 2 Alan Bannister; 25 Buddy Bell; 12 Dave Hostetler; 20,46 Jeff Kunkel; 9 Pete O'Brien; 2 Mike Richardt; 1 Bill Stein; 3 Wayne Tolleson; 19 Curtis Wilkerson	Outfielders: 13 Tom Dunbar; 6 Bobby Jones; 15 Larry Parrish; 5 Billy Sample; 32 Gary Ward; 26 George Wright; Other batters: 10 Kevin Buckley; 17 Mickey Rivers	Manager: 11 Doug Rader; Coaches: 37 Rich Donnelly; 18 Glenn Ezell; 22 Merv Rettenmund; 52 Dick Such; 42 Wayne Terwilliger

== Game log ==
=== Regular season ===
1984 regular season game log: 69–92 (Home: 34–46; Away: 35–46)
April: 8–14 (Home: 3–7; Away: 5–7)

#	Date	Time	Opponent	Score	Win	Loss	Save	Time of Game	Attendance	Record	Box/ Streak
1	April 3	7:35 p.m. CST	Indians	1-9	Sutcliffe (1–0)	**Hough** (0–1)	–	2:51	21,537	0–1	L1
2	April 5	7:35 p.m. CST	Indians	3-7	Heaton (1–0)	**Stewart** (0–1)	Spillner (1)	2:48	9,032	0–2	L2
3	April 6	7:35 p.m. CST	Yankees	7-6	**Tobik** (1–0)	Murray (0–1)	–	2:52	14,038	1–2	W1
4	April 7	12:30 p.m. CST	Yankees	8-5	**Mason** (1–0)	Fontenot (0–1)	–	1:53	12,181	2–2	W2
5	April 8	12:30 p.m. CST	Yankees	3-4	Murray (1–1)	**Tobik** (1–1)	–	3:51	21,409	2–3	L1
6	April 10	1:30 p.m. EST	@ Tigers	1–5	Petry (2–0)	**Stewart** (0–2)	–	2:32	51,238	2–4	L2
7	April 12	1:30 p.m. EST	@ Tigers	4–9	Morris (3–0)	**Tanana** (0–1)	–	2:48	19,154	2–5	L3
8	April 13	7:35 p.m. CST	Blue Jays	2-3	Lamp (1–2)	**Tobik** (1–2)	Key (1)	2:53	10,515	2–6	L4
9	April 14	12:30 p.m. CST	Blue Jays	6-2	**Hough** (1–1)	Clancy (0–1)	-	2:14	9,852	3–6	W1
10	April 15	12:30 p.m. CST	Blue Jays	1-2	Lamp (2–2)	**Stewart** (0–3)	-	2:09	12,583	3–7	L1
11	April 17	7:35 p.m. EST	@ Red Sox	8-4	**Tanana** (1–1)	Eckersley (0–2)	-	2:35	13,293	4–7	W1
12	April 18	7:35 p.m. EST	@ Red Sox	4-3	**Darwin** (1–0)	Ojeda (0–2)	**Tobik** (1)	2:21	12,052	5–7	W2
13	April 19	2:05 p.m. EST	@ Red Sox	7-4	**Jones** (1–0)	Boyd (0–2)	-	2:24	10,926	6–7	W3
14	April 20	8:00 p.m. EST	@ Yankees	1-4	Guidry (1–1)	**Stewart** (0–4)	-	2:10	17,861	6–8	L1
15	April 21	2:00 p.m. EST	@ Yankees	1-0	**Tanana** (2–1)	Fontenot (0–3)	**Tobik** (2)	2:28	20,729	7–8	W1
16	April 22	2:00 p.m. EST	@ Yankees	4-0	**Darwin** (2–0)	Rijo (0–1)	-	2:28	20,530	8–8	W2
17	April 23	1:35 p.m. EST	@ Indians	1-3	Sutcliffe (3–1)	**Hough** (1–2)	Camacho (3)	2:16	3,188	8–9	L1
18	April 25	7:35 p.m. CST	Tigers	4–9	Wilcox (2–0)	**Stewart** (0–5)	Hernández (2)	2:38	25,883	8–10	L2
19	April 26	7:35 p.m. CST	Tigers	5–7	Bair (2–0)	**Tanana** (2–2)	López (2)	2:50	13,559	8–11	L3
20	April 27	2:05 p.m. EST	@ Orioles	3-4	Stewart (3–0)	**Tobik** (1–3)	-	3:15	35,629	8–12	L4
21	April 28	7:35 p.m. EST	@ Orioles	1-6	McGregor (3–3)	**Hough** (1–3)	-	2:16	22,124	8–13	L5
22	April 29	2:05 p.m. EDT	@ Orioles	2-3	Davis (1–0)	**Stewart** (0–6)	Martinez (2)	2:12	34,467	8–14	L6

May: 12–15 (Home: 6–8; Away: 6–7)

#	Date	Time (CT)	Opponent	Score	Win	Loss	Save	Time of Game	Attendance	Record	Box/ Streak

June: 15–15 (Home: 7–6; Away: 8–9)

#	Date	Time (CT)	Opponent	Score	Win	Loss	Save	Time of Game	Attendance	Record	Box/ Streak

July: 10–17 (Home: 5–9; Away: 5–8)

#	Date	Time (CT)	Opponent	Score	Win	Loss	Save	Time of Game	Attendance	Record	Box/ Streak
84	July 5	7:35 p.m. CDT	Tigers	4–7	López (7–0)	**Hough** (8–7)	Hernández (15)	2:26	15,151	36–48	L3
85	July 6	7:35 p.m. CDT	Tigers	5–3	**Mason** (6–6)	Berenguer (4–7)	**Schmidt** (4)	2:42	22,378	37–48	W1
86	July 7	7:35 p.m. CDT	Tigers	2–5	Rozema (5–1)	**Darwin** (5–5)	Hernández (16)	2:41	29,262	37–49	L1
87	July 8	7:35 p.m. CDT	Tigers	9–7	**Tanana** (9–8)	Bair (4–2)	**Schmidt** (5)	2:37	16,010	38–48	W1
**55th All-Star Game in San Francisco, CA**
95	July 19	6:35 p.m. CDT	@ Tigers	2–9	Wilcox (9–6)	**Stewart** (4–11)	–	2:32	26,908	40–55	L2
96	July 20	6:35 p.m. CDT	@ Tigers	1–3	Rozema (7–1)	**Tanana** (9–9)	Hernández (18)	2:16	39,484	40–56	L3
97	July 21	6:35 p.m. CDT	@ Tigers	6–7	Monge (1–0)	**Noles** (1–1)	Hernández (19)	2:38	46,219	40–57	L4
98	July 22	12:30 p.m. CDT	@ Tigers	0–2	Petry (13–4)	**Hough** (10–8)	Hernández (20)	2:11	37,846	66–29	L5

August: 15–13 (Home: 9–6; Away: 6–7)

#	Date	Time (CT)	Opponent	Score	Win	Loss	Save	Time of Game	Attendance	Record	Box/ Streak

September: 9–18 (Home: 4–10; Away: 5–7)

#	Date	Time (CT)	Opponent	Score	Win	Loss	Save	Time of Game	Attendance	Record	Box/ Streak

Legend: = Win = Loss = Postponement
Bold = Rangers team member

== Player stats ==
=== Batting ===
==== Starters by position ====
Note: Pos = Position; G = Games played; AB = At bats; H = Hits; Avg. = Batting average; HR = Home runs; RBI = Runs batted in

Pos	Player	G	AB	H	Avg.	HR	RBI
C	Donnie Scott	81	235	52	.221	3	20
1B	Pete O'Brien	142	520	149	.287	18	80
2B	Wayne Tolleson	118	338	72	.213	0	9
SS	Curt Wilkerson	153	484	120	.248	1	26
3B	Buddy Bell	148	553	174	.315	11	83
LF	Billy Sample	130	489	121	.247	5	33
CF	Gary Ward	155	602	171	.284	21	79
RF	Larry Parrish	156	613	175	.285	22	101
DH	Mickey Rivers	102	313	94	.300	4	33

==== Other batters ====
Note: G = Games played; AB = At bats; H = Hits; Avg. = Batting average; HR = Home runs; RBI = Runs batted in

Player	G	AB	H	Avg.	HR	RBI
George Wright	101	383	93	.243	9	48
Ned Yost	80	242	44	.182	6	25
Bobby Jones	64	143	37	.259	4	22
Jeff Kunkel	50	142	29	.204	3	7
Marv Foley	63	115	25	.217	6	19
Alan Bannister	47	112	33	.295	2	9
Tom Dunbar	34	97	25	.258	2	10
Dave Hostetler	37	82	18	.220	3	10
Jim Anderson	39	47	5	.106	0	1
Bill Stein	27	43	12	.279	0	3
Mike Richardt	6	9	1	.111	0	0
Kevin Buckley	5	7	2	.286	0	0

=== Pitching ===
==== Starting pitchers ====
Note: G = Games pitched; IP = Innings pitched; W = Wins; L = Losses; ERA = Earned run average; SO = Strikeouts

Player	G	IP	W	L	ERA	SO
Charlie Hough	36	266.0	16	14	3.76	164
Frank Tanana	35	246.1	15	15	3.25	141
Danny Darwin	35	223.2	8	12	3.94	123
Dave Stewart	32	192.1	7	14	4.73	119
Mike Mason	36	184.1	9	13	3.61	113

==== Other pitchers ====
Note: G = Games pitched; IP = Innings pitched; W = Wins; L = Losses; ERA = Earned run average; SO = Strikeouts

Player	G	IP	W	L	ERA	SO
Dickie Noles	18	57.2	2	3	5.15	39
Ricky Wright	8	14.2	0	2	6.14	6

==== Relief pitchers ====
Note: G = Games pitched; W = Wins; L = Losses; SV = Saves; ERA = Earned run average; SO = Strikeouts

Player	G	W	L	SV	ERA	SO
Dave Schmidt	43	6	6	12	2.56	46
Odell Jones	33	2	4	2	3.64	28
Tom Henke	25	1	1	2	6.35	25
Dave Tobik	24	1	6	5	3.61	30
Joey McLaughlin	15	2	1	0	4.41	21
Jim Bibby	8	0	0	0	4.41	6
Dwayne Henry	3	0	1	0	8.31	2

=== Awards and honors ===
- Buddy Bell, 3B, Gold Glove 1984
- Buddy Bell, 3B, Silver Slugger Award, 1984

All-Star Game

== Farm system ==
Level	Team	League	Manager
AAA	Oklahoma City 89ers	American Association	Tom Burgess and Rusty Gerhardt
AA	Tulsa Drillers	Texas League	Orlando Gómez
A	Salem Redbirds	Carolina League	Bill Stearns
A	Burlington Rangers	Midwest League	Rudy Jaramillo
A-Short Season	Tri-City Triplets	Northwest League	Marty Scott
Rookie	GCL Rangers	Gulf Coast League	Mike Bucci

LEAGUE CHAMPIONS: Tri-City, GCL Rangers
