= 1984 Seattle Mariners season =

1984 Seattle Mariners
- League: American League
- Division: West
- Ballpark: Kingdome
- City: Seattle, Washington
- Record: 74–88 (.457)
- Divisional place: 5th
- Owners: George Argyros
- General managers: Hal Keller
- Managers: Del Crandall, Chuck Cottier (September 1)
- Television: KSTW-TV 11
- Radio: KVI 570 AM: (Dave Niehaus, Rick Rizzs, Nelson Briles)

The Seattle Mariners 1984 season was their eighth since the franchise creation. They finished fifth in the American League West with a record of 74–88 (.457).

== Offseason ==
- November 21, 1983: Bill Caudill and Darrel Akerfelds were traded to the Oakland Athletics for Dave Beard and Bob Kearney.
- December 5, 1983: Dave Geisel was selected by the Mariners from the Toronto Blue Jays in the rule 5 draft.
- January 17, 1984: Mike Blowers was selected in the eighth round of the amateur draft, but did not sign.
- March 23, 1984: Rick Sweet was released by the Mariners.

== Regular season ==
- September 1 – Manager Del Crandall (59–76 (.437)) was fired on Saturday morning, September 1, succeeded by third base coach Chuck Cottier.
- First baseman Alvin Davis reached base in each of the first 47 games of his career, and was chosen for his only All-Star Game. The M's MVP, he was also voted the American League's Rookie of the Year, with a .284 batting average, 27 home runs, and 116 RBIs.
- Lefthanded starting pitcher Mark Langston became the first rookie since Herb Score to lead the American League in strikeouts; he was second in the balloting to teammate Davis for AL Rookie of the Year

=== Season standings ===
AL West
Team	W	L	Pct.	GB	Home	Road
Kansas City Royals	84	78	.519	—	44‍–‍37	40‍–‍41
California Angels	81	81	.500	3	37‍–‍44	44‍–‍37
Minnesota Twins	81	81	.500	3	47‍–‍34	34‍–‍47
Oakland Athletics	77	85	.475	7	44‍–‍37	33‍–‍48
Chicago White Sox	74	88	.457	10	43‍–‍38	31‍–‍50
Seattle Mariners	74	88	.457	10	42‍–‍39	32‍–‍49
Texas Rangers	69	92	.429	14½	34‍–‍46	35‍–‍46

=== Record vs. opponents ===
1984 American League record Sources:
Team	BAL	BOS	CAL	CWS	CLE	DET	KC	MIL	MIN	NYY	OAK	SEA	TEX	TOR
Baltimore	—	6–7	8–4	7–5	7–6	7–6	5–7	7–6	5–7	5–8	6–6	9–3	9–3	4–9
Boston	7–6	—	9–3	7–5	10–3	7–6	3–9	9–4	6–6	7–6	7–5	4–8	5–7	5–8
California	4–8	3–9	—	8–5	8–4	4–8	6–7	8–4	4–9	8–4	7–6	9–4	5–8	7–5
Chicago	5–7	5–7	5–8	—	8–4	4–8	5–8	7–5	8–5	7–5	6–7	5–8	5–8	4–8
Cleveland	6–7	3–10	4–8	4–8	—	4–9	6–6	9–4	7–5	2–11	7–5	8–4	9–3	6–7–1
Detroit	6–7	6–7	8–4	8–4	9–4	—	7–5	11–2	9–3	7–6	9–3	6–6	10–2	8–5
Kansas City	7–5	9–3	7–6	8–5	6–6	5–7	—	6–6	6–7	5–7	5–8	9–4	6–7	5–7
Milwaukee	6–7	4–9	4–8	5–7	4–9	2–11	6–6	—	5–7	6–7	4–8	6–6	5–6	10–3
Minnesota	7–5	6–6	9–4	5–8	5–7	3–9	7–6	7–5	—	8–4	8–5	7–6	8–5	1–11
New York	8–5	6–7	4–8	5–7	11–2	6–7	7–5	7–6	4–8	—	8–4	7–5	6–6	8–5
Oakland	6–6	5–7	6–7	7–6	5–7	3–9	8–5	8–4	5–8	4–8	—	8–5	8–5	4–8
Seattle	3–9	8–4	4–9	8–5	4–8	6–6	4–9	6–6	6–7	5–7	5–8	—	10–3	5–7
Texas	3–9	7–5	8–5	8–5	3–9	2–10	7–6	6–5	5–8	6–6	5–8	3–10	—	6–6
Toronto	9–4	8–5	5–7	8–4	7–6–1	5–8	7–5	3–10	11–1	5–8	8–4	7–5	6–6	—

=== Roster ===
1984 Seattle Mariners
Roster
Pitchers: 38 Salomé Barojas; 33 Dave Beard; 45 Jim Beattie; 39 Karl Best; 37 Dave Geisel; 36 Lee Guetterman; 12 Mark Langston; 52 Paul Mirabella; 25 Mike Moore; 30 Edwin Núñez; 46 Mike Stanton; 34 Bob Stoddard; 49 Roy Thomas; 32 Ed Vande Berg; 40 Matt Young	Catchers: 11 Bob Kearney; 2 Orlando Mercado; 6 Bill Nahorodny; 41 Dave Valle; Infielders: 6,19 Darnell Coles; 21 Alvin Davis; 8 Larry Milbourne; 7 Spike Owen; 14 Jack Perconte; 17 Jim Presley; 3 Domingo Ramos; 4 Harold Reynolds; 38 Danny Tartabull	Outfielders: 9 Barry Bonnell; 29 Phil Bradley; 13 Iván Calderón; 47 Al Chambers; 16 Al Cowens; 42 Dave Henderson; 5 Steve Henderson; 26 John Moses; 10 Ricky Nelson; 20 Gorman Thomas; Other batters: 44 Ken Phelps; 23 Pat Putnam	Manager: 15 Chuck Cottier; 1 Del Crandall; Coaches: 15 Chuck Cottier (Third Base); 35 Frank Funk (Pitching); 33 Ben Hines (Hitting); 4 Phil Roof (First Base)

== Game log ==
=== Regular season ===
1984 regular season game log: 74–88 (Home: 42–39; Away: 32–49)
April: 12–11 (Home: 7–3; Away: 5–8)

#	Date	Time (PT)	Opponent	Score	Win	Loss	Save	Time of Game	Attendance	Record	Box/ Streak

May: 11–16 (Home: 7–8; Away: 4–8)

#	Date	Time (PT)	Opponent	Score	Win	Loss	Save	Time of Game	Attendance	Record	Box/ Streak
36	May 14		@ Tigers	5–7	Lopez	**Vande Berg**	–	3:05	18,830	18–18	L2
37	May 15		@ Tigers	4–6	Morris	**Thomas**	Hernandez	3:32	21,782	18–19	L3
38	May 16		@ Tigers	1–10	Wilcox	**Young**	–	2:52	22,001	18–20	L4
45	May 25		Tigers	7–3	**Vande Berg**	Wilcox	**Mirabella**	2:54	15,722	21–24	W1
46	May 26		Tigers	9–5	**Moore**	Berenguer	–	2:51	41,342	22–24	W2
47	May 27		Tigers	6–1	**Young**	Petry	–	2:50	12,755	23–24	W3

June: 14–15 (Home: 5–7; Away: 9–8)

#	Date	Time (PT)	Opponent	Score	Win	Loss	Save	Time of Game	Attendance	Record	Box/ Streak

July: 12–16 (Home: 8–6; Away: 4–10)

#	Date	Time (PT)	Opponent	Score	Win	Loss	Save	Time of Game	Attendance	Record	Box/ Streak
**55th All-Star Game in San Francisco, CA**

August: 10–18 (Home: 8–6; Away: 4–10)

#	Date	Time (PT)	Opponent	Score	Win	Loss	Save	Time of Game	Attendance	Record	Box/ Streak
123	August 17		@ Tigers	2–6	Wilcox	**Moore**	–	3:08	36,496	55–68	L1
124	August 18		@ Tigers	3–4	Berenguer	**Geisel**	Hernandez	2:41	36,719	55–69	L2
125	August 19		@ Tigers	4–1	**Langston**	Petry	**Vande Berg**	2:51	43,277	56–69	W1
132	August 28		Tigers	4–5	Hernandez	**Stanton**	–	2:51	8,353	57–75	L5
133	August 29		Tigers	5–1	**Langston**	Petry	–	2:11	10,863	58–75	W1
134	August 30		Tigers	2–1	**Beattie**	Morris	**Nunez**	2:34	9,583	59–75	W2

September: 15–12 (Home: 10–6; Away: 5–6)

#	Date	Time (PT)	Opponent	Score	Win	Loss	Save	Time of Game	Attendance	Record	Box/ Streak

Legend: = Win = Loss = Postponement
Bold = Mariners team member

== Player stats ==
=== Batting ===
==== Starters by position ====
Note: Pos = Position; G = Games played; AB = At bats; H = Hits; Avg. = Batting average; HR = Home runs; RBI = Runs batted in

Pos	Player	G	AB	H	Avg.	HR	RBI
C	Bob Kearney	133	431	97	.225	7	43
1B	Alvin Davis	152	567	161	.284	27	116
2B	Jack Perconte	155	612	180	.294	0	31
SS	Spike Owen	152	530	130	.245	3	43
3B	Jim Presley	70	251	57	.227	10	36
LF	Barry Bonnell	110	363	96	.264	8	48
CF	Dave Henderson	112	350	98	.280	14	43
RF	Al Cowens	139	524	145	.277	15	78
DH	Ken Phelps	101	290	70	.241	24	51

==== Other batters ====
Note: G = Games played; AB = At bats; H = Hits; Avg. = Batting average; HR = Home runs; RBI = Runs batted in

Player	G	AB	H	Avg.	HR	RBI
Steve Henderson	109	325	85	.262	10	35
Phil Bradley	124	322	97	.301	0	24
Larry Milbourne	79	211	56	.265	1	22
Pat Putnam	64	155	31	.200	2	16
Darnell Coles	48	143	23	.161	0	6
Gorman Thomas	35	108	17	.157	1	13
Domingo Ramos	59	81	15	.185	0	2
Orlando Mercado	30	78	17	.218	0	5
Al Chambers	22	49	11	.224	1	4
John Moses	19	35	12	.343	0	2
Dave Valle	13	27	8	.296	1	4
Bill Nahorodny	12	25	6	.240	1	3
Iván Calderón	11	24	5	.208	1	1
Danny Tartabull	10	20	6	.300	2	7
Ricky Nelson	9	15	3	.200	1	2
Harold Reynolds	10	10	3	.300	0	0

=== Pitching ===
==== Starting pitchers ====
Note: G = Games pitched; IP = Innings pitched; W = Wins; L = Losses; ERA = Earned run average; SO = Strikeouts

Player	G	IP	W	L	ERA	SO
Mark Langston	35	225.0	17	10	3.40	204
Mike Moore	34	212.0	7	17	4.97	158
Jim Beattie	32	211.0	12	16	3.41	119
Matt Young	22	113.1	6	8	5.72	73
Salomé Barojas	19	95.1	6	5	3.97	37

==== Other pitchers ====
Note: G = Games pitched; IP = Innings pitched; W = Wins; L = Losses; ERA = Earned run average; SO = Strikeouts

Player	G	IP	W	L	ERA	SO
Ed Vande Berg	50	130.1	8	12	4.76	71
Bob Stoddard	27	79.0	2	3	5.13	39
Dave Geisel	20	43.1	1	1	4.15	28

==== Relief pitchers ====
Note: G = Games pitched; W = Wins; L = Losses; SV = Saves; ERA = Earned run average; SO = Strikeouts

Player	G	W	L	SV	ERA	SO
Mike Stanton	54	4	4	8	3.54	55
Paul Mirabella	52	2	5	3	4.37	41
Dave Beard	43	3	2	5	5.80	40
Edwin Núñez	37	2	2	7	3.19	57
Roy Thomas	21	3	2	1	5.26	42
Karl Best	5	1	1	0	3.00	6
Lee Guetterman	3	0	0	0	4.15	2

== Awards and honors ==
- Mark Langston – American League Leader, Strikeouts (204)

All-Star Game

== Farm system ==
Level	Team	League	Manager
AAA	Salt Lake City Gulls	Pacific Coast League	Bobby Floyd
AA	Chattanooga Lookouts	Southern League	Bill Plummer
A	Salinas Spurs	California League	R. J. Harrison
A	Wausau Timbers	Midwest League	Greg Mahlberg
A-Short Season	Bellingham Mariners	Northwest League	Gary Pellant
Rookie	Butte Copper Kings	Pioneer League	Manny Estrada
