= 1984 Oakland Athletics season =

1984 Oakland Athletics
- League: American League
- Division: West
- Ballpark: Oakland–Alameda County Coliseum
- City: Oakland, California
- Record: 77–85 (.475)
- Divisional place: 4th
- Owners: Walter A. Haas, Jr.
- General managers: Sandy Alderson
- Managers: Steve Boros, Jackie Moore
- Television: KBHK-TV (Bill King, Bill Rigney, Lon Simmons)
- Radio: KSFO (Bill King, Lon Simmons, Wayne Hagin)

The 1984 Oakland Athletics season was the 84th season for the Oakland Athletics franchise, all as members of the American League, and their 17th season in Oakland. The Athletics finished fourth in the American League West with a record of 77 wins and 85 losses. While the A's struggled for a third consecutive season, they staged a major coup by drafting future superstar Mark McGwire with the tenth overall pick of the 1984 Major League Baseball draft. The season also marked the end of Rickey Henderson's first (of four) stints with the Athletics. His second stint would begin in 1989. After 13 years, this would be the final season that the Athletics wore their Swingin' A's era uniforms.

== Offseason ==
- October 28, 1983: Joe Rudi was released by the Athletics.
- November 21, 1983: Dave Beard and Bob Kearney were traded by the Athletics to the Seattle Mariners for Bill Caudill and Darrel Akerfelds.
- December 13, 1983: Joe Morgan was signed as a free agent by the Athletics.
- December 7, 1983: Rusty McNealy and cash were traded by the Athletics to the Montreal Expos for Ray Burris.
- January 3, 1984: Luis Polonia was signed by the Athletics as an amateur free agent.
- January 3, 1984: Félix José was signed by the Athletics as an amateur free agent.
- January 16, 1984: Jack Daugherty was released by the Athletics.
- February 8, 1984: Tim Belcher was chosen by the Athletics from the New York Yankees as a free agent compensation pick.

== Regular season ==
- August 19, 1984: In a game against the Athletics, Cliff Johnson of the Toronto Blue Jays hit the 19th pinch home run of his career, breaking Jerry Lynch's mark of 18.

=== Season standings ===
AL West
Team	W	L	Pct.	GB	Home	Road
Kansas City Royals	84	78	.519	—	44‍–‍37	40‍–‍41
California Angels	81	81	.500	3	37‍–‍44	44‍–‍37
Minnesota Twins	81	81	.500	3	47‍–‍34	34‍–‍47
Oakland Athletics	77	85	.475	7	44‍–‍37	33‍–‍48
Chicago White Sox	74	88	.457	10	43‍–‍38	31‍–‍50
Seattle Mariners	74	88	.457	10	42‍–‍39	32‍–‍49
Texas Rangers	69	92	.429	14½	34‍–‍46	35‍–‍46

=== Record vs. opponents ===
1984 American League record Sources:
Team	BAL	BOS	CAL	CWS	CLE	DET	KC	MIL	MIN	NYY	OAK	SEA	TEX	TOR
Baltimore	—	6–7	8–4	7–5	7–6	7–6	5–7	7–6	5–7	5–8	6–6	9–3	9–3	4–9
Boston	7–6	—	9–3	7–5	10–3	7–6	3–9	9–4	6–6	7–6	7–5	4–8	5–7	5–8
California	4–8	3–9	—	8–5	8–4	4–8	6–7	8–4	4–9	8–4	7–6	9–4	5–8	7–5
Chicago	5–7	5–7	5–8	—	8–4	4–8	5–8	7–5	8–5	7–5	6–7	5–8	5–8	4–8
Cleveland	6–7	3–10	4–8	4–8	—	4–9	6–6	9–4	7–5	2–11	7–5	8–4	9–3	6–7–1
Detroit	6–7	6–7	8–4	8–4	9–4	—	7–5	11–2	9–3	7–6	9–3	6–6	10–2	8–5
Kansas City	7–5	9–3	7–6	8–5	6–6	5–7	—	6–6	6–7	5–7	5–8	9–4	6–7	5–7
Milwaukee	6–7	4–9	4–8	5–7	4–9	2–11	6–6	—	5–7	6–7	4–8	6–6	5–6	10–3
Minnesota	7–5	6–6	9–4	5–8	5–7	3–9	7–6	7–5	—	8–4	8–5	7–6	8–5	1–11
New York	8–5	6–7	4–8	5–7	11–2	6–7	7–5	7–6	4–8	—	8–4	7–5	6–6	8–5
Oakland	6–6	5–7	6–7	7–6	5–7	3–9	8–5	8–4	5–8	4–8	—	8–5	8–5	4–8
Seattle	3–9	8–4	4–9	8–5	4–8	6–6	4–9	6–6	6–7	5–7	5–8	—	10–3	5–7
Texas	3–9	7–5	8–5	8–5	3–9	2–10	7–6	6–5	5–8	6–6	5–8	3–10	—	6–6
Toronto	9–4	8–5	5–7	8–4	7–6–1	5–8	7–5	3–10	11–1	5–8	8–4	7–5	6–6	—

=== Notable transactions ===
- June 4, 1984: 1984 Major League Baseball draft
  - Mark McGwire was drafted by the Athletics in the 1st round (10th pick). Player signed July 20, 1984.
  - Todd Burns was drafted by the Athletics in the 7th round.
- June 9, 1984: Chuck Hensley was purchased by the Milwaukee Brewers from the Oakland Athletics.
- July 3, 1984: Mike Torrez was signed as a free agent by the Athletics.
- August 9, 1984: Mike Torrez was released by the Athletics.

=== Roster ===
1984 Oakland Athletics
Roster
Pitchers: 55 Keith Atherton; 52 Jeff Bettendorf; 39 Tom Burgmeier; 48 Ray Burris; 36 Bill Caudill; 23 Chris Codiroli; 24 Tim Conroy; 13 Gorman Heimueller; 38 Jeff Jones; 32 Bill Krueger; 22 Rick Langford; 52 Dave Leiper; 54 Steve McCatty; 30 Chuck Rainey; 27,40 Lary Sorensen; 33 Mike Torrez; 43 Mike Warren; 29 Curt Young	Catchers: 19 Jim Essian; 2 Mike Heath; 6 Mickey Tettleton; Infielders: 20 Bruce Bochte; 25 Donnie Hill; 28 Steve Kiefer; 4 Carney Lansford; 12 Dan Meyer; 8 Joe Morgan; 18 Tony Phillips; 9 Mark Wagner	Outfielders: 34 Bill Almon; 16 Mike Davis; 11 Garry Hancock; 35 Rickey Henderson; 15 Davey Lopes; 21 Dwayne Murphy; Other batters: 3 Jeff Burroughs; 10 Dave Kingman	Manager: 14 Steve Boros; 42 Jackie Moore; Coaches: 41 Clete Boyer (Third Base); 42 Jackie Moore (First Base); 45 Bob Didier (Bench/First Base); 46 Dave McKay (Bullpen); 37 Ron Schueler (Pitching); 44 Wes Stock (Pitching); 26 Billy Williams (Hitting)

== Player stats ==
=== Batting ===
==== Starters by position ====
Note: Pos = Position; G = Games played; AB = At bats; H = Hits; Avg. = Batting average; HR = Home runs; RBI = Runs batted in

Pos	Player	G	AB	H	Avg.	HR	RBI
C	Mike Heath	140	475	118	.248	13	64
1B	Bruce Bochte	148	469	124	.264	5	52
2B	Joe Morgan	116	365	89	.244	6	43
SS	Tony Phillips	154	451	120	.266	4	37
3B	Carney Lansford	151	597	179	.300	14	74
LF	Rickey Henderson	142	502	147	.293	16	58
CF	Dwayne Murphy	153	559	143	.256	33	88
RF	Mike Davis	134	382	88	.230	9	46
DH	Dave Kingman	147	549	147	.268	35	118

==== Other batters ====
Note: G = Games played; AB = At bats; H = Hits; Avg. = Batting average; HR = Home runs; RBI = Runs batted in

Player	G	AB	H	Avg.	HR	RBI
Davey Lopes	72	230	59	.257	9	36
Bill Almon	106	211	47	.223	7	16
Donnie Hill	73	174	40	.230	2	16
Jim Essian	63	136	32	.235	2	10
Mark Wagner	80	87	20	.230	0	12
Mickey Tettleton	33	76	20	.263	1	5
Jeff Burroughs	58	71	15	.211	2	8
Garry Hancock	51	60	13	.217	0	8
Steve Kiefer	23	40	7	.175	0	2
Dan Meyer	20	22	7	.318	0	4

=== Pitching ===
==== Starting pitchers ====
Note: G = Games pitched; IP = Innings pitched; W = Wins; L = Losses; ERA = Earned run average; SO = Strikeouts

Player	G	IP	W	L	ERA	SO
Ray Burris	34	211.2	13	10	3.15	93
Steve McCatty	33	179.2	8	14	4.76	63
Bill Krueger	26	142.0	10	10	4.75	61
Curt Young	20	108.2	9	4	4.06	41

==== Other pitchers ====
Note: G = Games pitched; IP = Innings pitched; W = Wins; L = Losses; ERA = Earned run average; SO = Strikeouts

Player	G	IP	W	L	ERA	SO
Lary Sorensen	46	183.1	6	13	4.91	63
Tim Conroy	38	93.0	1	6	5.23	69
Mike Warren	24	90.0	3	6	4.90	61
Chris Codiroli	28	89.1	6	4	5.84	44
Rick Langford	3	8.2	0	0	8.31	2

==== Relief pitchers ====
Note: G = Games pitched; W = Wins; L = Losses; SV = Saves; ERA = Earned run average; SO = Strikeouts

Player	G	W	L	SV	ERA	SO
Bill Caudill	68	9	7	36	2.71	89
Keith Atherton	57	7	6	2	4.33	58
Tom Burgmeier	17	3	0	2	2.35	8
Chuck Rainey	16	1	1	1	6.75	10
Jeff Jones	13	0	3	0	3.55	19
Dave Leiper	8	1	0	0	9.00	3
Gorman Heimueller	6	0	1	0	6.14	3
Jeff Bettendorf	3	0	0	1	4.66	5
Mike Torrez	2	0	0	0	27.00	2
Mark Wagner	1	0	0	0	0.00	1
Garry Hancock	1	0	0	0	0.00	0

== Farm system ==
Level	Team	League	Manager
AAA	Tacoma Tigers	Pacific Coast League	Ed Nottle
AA	Albany-Colonie A's	Eastern League	Keith Lieppman
A	Modesto A's	California League	George Mitterwald
A	Madison Muskies	Midwest League	Brad Fischer
A-Short Season	Medford A's	Northwest League	Dennis Rogers
Rookie	Idaho Falls A's	Pioneer League	Jim Nettles

LEAGUE CHAMPIONS: Modesto
