= 1984 Boston Red Sox season =

Major League Baseball season

1984 Boston Red Sox
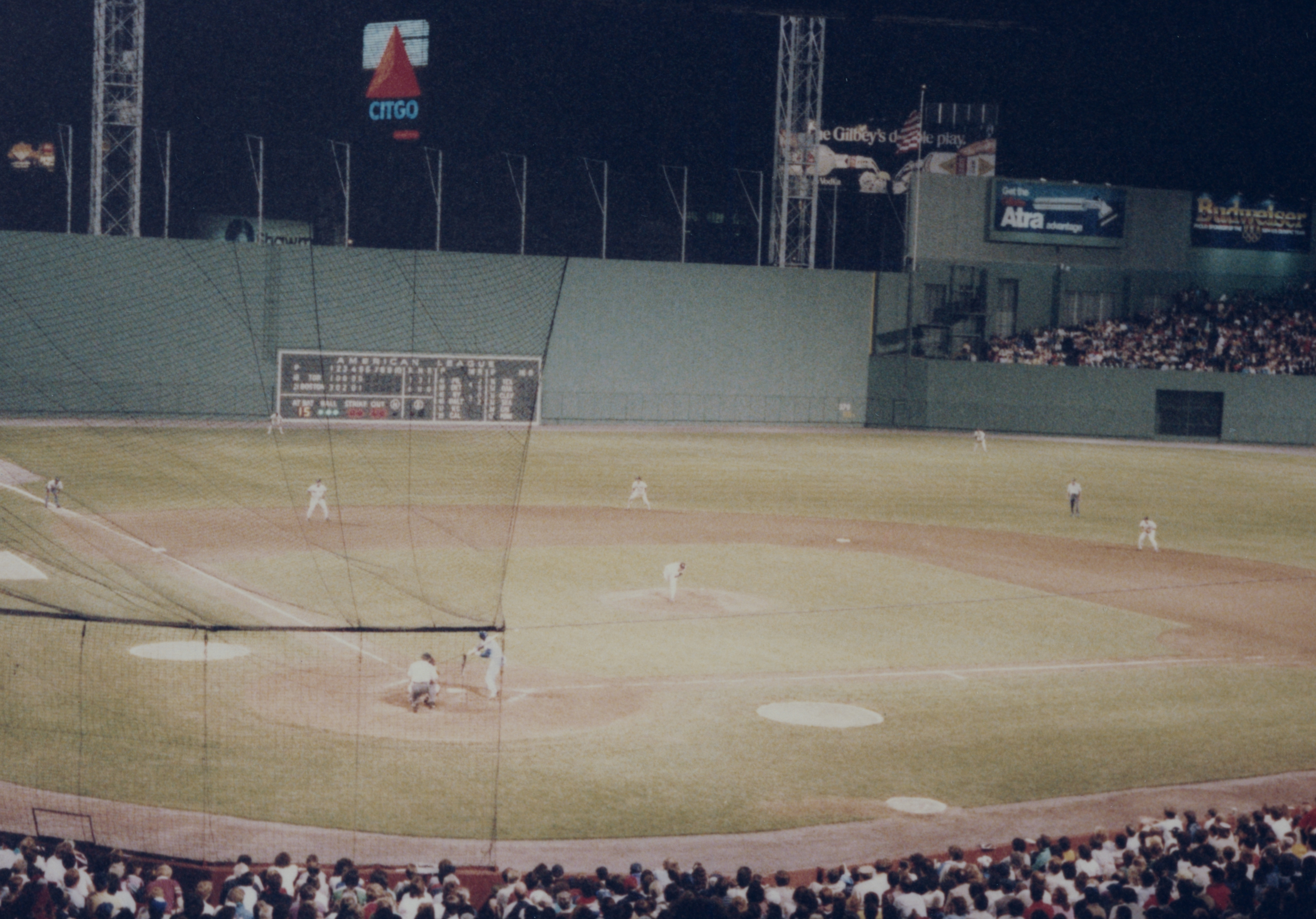
- The Red Sox playing the Toronto Blue Jays
- League: American League
- Division: East
- Ballpark: Fenway Park
- City: Boston, Massachusetts
- Record: 86–76 (.531)
- Divisional place: 4th place
- Owners: Buddy LeRoux, Haywood Sullivan, Jean Yawkey
- President: Jean Yawkey
- General managers: Haywood Sullivan, Lou Gorman
- Manager: Ralph Houk
- Television: WSBK-TV, Ch. 38 (Ned Martin, Bob Montgomery); NESN (Kent Derdivanis, Mike Andrews)
- Radio: WPLM-FM 99.1; WPLM-AM 1390 (Ken Coleman, Joe Castiglione)
- Stats: ESPN.com; Baseball Reference

The 1984 Boston Red Sox season was the 84th season in the franchise's Major League Baseball history. The Red Sox finished fourth in the American League East Division with a record of 86 wins and 76 losses, 18 games behind the Detroit Tigers, who went on to win the 1984 World Series.

Off the field, two court decisions in June 1984 ended general partner Buddy LeRoux' year-old attempt to wrest control of the Red Sox from fellow general partners Jean R. Yawkey and Haywood Sullivan. Upon losing his attempted take-over, LeRoux is stripped of his title of executive vice president (administration), Sullivan is promoted from general manager to chief executive and chief operating officer, and Lou Gorman, who joined the Red Sox in February, succeeds Sullivan as general manager. By early 1987, Yawkey will acquire both LeRoux' limited partnership and general partnership shares, giving her majority control of the club, and LeRoux will depart the organization completely.

== Offseason ==
- December 3, 1983: John Tudor was traded by the Red Sox to the Pittsburgh Pirates for Mike Easler.

== Regular season ==
Record by month
Month	Record		Cumulative		AL East		Ref.
Month	Won	Lost	Won	Lost	Position	GB	Ref.
April	9	13	9	13	6th	10	
May	12	13	21	26	5th	16 1/2	
June	15	14	36	40	4th	19	
July	18	9	54	49	4th	16 1/2	
August	17	14	71	63	5th	15 1/2	
September	15	13	86	76	4th	18	

=== Highlights ===
- In a ceremony at Fenway Park on May 29, the Red Sox honored Joe Cronin and Ted Williams with the franchise's first retired numbers, 4 and 9, respectively.
- Tony Armas led American League hitters with 43 home runs, 123 RBIs, 77 extra-base hits and 339 total bases. Despite winning the home run and RBI titles, Armas finished 7th in the 1984 AL MVP voting; Ted Williams had been the most recent player to lead the league in home runs and RBIs without winning MVP honors.
- Dwight Evans ranked in the top ten of 11 different offensive categories, leading the league in OPS (.920), games (162), runs (121) and extra-base hits (77, tied with Armas), while ending second in total bases (335); third in slugging percentage (.532) and walks (96); fourth in doubles (37); sixth in on-base percentage(.388); seventh in hits (186) and home runs (32), and eighth in RBIs (104).
- Wade Boggs led the league in singles (162) and times on base (292), while ending second in hits (203) and on-base percentage (.407), and third in batting average (.325) and runs (109).
- Jim Rice finished second in the league with 122 RBIs, seventh in total bases (307), and ninth in hits (184). He also set a major league record, which still stands, for the most times grounding into a double play during a season, 36.

Joe; Cronin; SS: 1935–45; M: 1935–47; GM: 1947–59; Retired 1984	Ted; Williams; OF: 1939–60 Retired 1984

=== Season standings ===
AL East
Team	W	L	Pct.	GB	Home	Road
Detroit Tigers	104	58	.642	—	53‍–‍29	51‍–‍29
Toronto Blue Jays	89	73	.549	15	49‍–‍32	40‍–‍41
New York Yankees	87	75	.537	17	51‍–‍30	36‍–‍45
Boston Red Sox	86	76	.531	18	41‍–‍40	45‍–‍36
Baltimore Orioles	85	77	.525	19	44‍–‍37	41‍–‍40
Cleveland Indians	75	87	.463	29	41‍–‍39	34‍–‍48
Milwaukee Brewers	67	94	.416	36½	38‍–‍43	29‍–‍51

=== Record vs. opponents ===
1984 American League record Sources:
Team	BAL	BOS	CAL	CWS	CLE	DET	KC	MIL	MIN	NYY	OAK	SEA	TEX	TOR
Baltimore	—	6–7	8–4	7–5	7–6	7–6	5–7	7–6	5–7	5–8	6–6	9–3	9–3	4–9
Boston	7–6	—	9–3	7–5	10–3	7–6	3–9	9–4	6–6	7–6	7–5	4–8	5–7	5–8
California	4–8	3–9	—	8–5	8–4	4–8	6–7	8–4	4–9	8–4	7–6	9–4	5–8	7–5
Chicago	5–7	5–7	5–8	—	8–4	4–8	5–8	7–5	8–5	7–5	6–7	5–8	5–8	4–8
Cleveland	6–7	3–10	4–8	4–8	—	4–9	6–6	9–4	7–5	2–11	7–5	8–4	9–3	6–7–1
Detroit	6–7	6–7	8–4	8–4	9–4	—	7–5	11–2	9–3	7–6	9–3	6–6	10–2	8–5
Kansas City	7–5	9–3	7–6	8–5	6–6	5–7	—	6–6	6–7	5–7	5–8	9–4	6–7	5–7
Milwaukee	6–7	4–9	4–8	5–7	4–9	2–11	6–6	—	5–7	6–7	4–8	6–6	5–6	10–3
Minnesota	7–5	6–6	9–4	5–8	5–7	3–9	7–6	7–5	—	8–4	8–5	7–6	8–5	1–11
New York	8–5	6–7	4–8	5–7	11–2	6–7	7–5	7–6	4–8	—	8–4	7–5	6–6	8–5
Oakland	6–6	5–7	6–7	7–6	5–7	3–9	8–5	8–4	5–8	4–8	—	8–5	8–5	4–8
Seattle	3–9	8–4	4–9	8–5	4–8	6–6	4–9	6–6	6–7	5–7	5–8	—	10–3	5–7
Texas	3–9	7–5	8–5	8–5	3–9	2–10	7–6	6–5	5–8	6–6	5–8	3–10	—	6–6
Toronto	9–4	8–5	5–7	8–4	7–6–1	5–8	7–5	3–10	11–1	5–8	8–4	7–5	6–6	—

=== Notable transactions ===
- May 25, 1984: Dennis Eckersley and Mike Brumley were traded by the Red Sox to the Chicago Cubs for Bill Buckner.
- June 4, 1984: John Marzano was selected by Boston in the first round (14th pick) of the 1984 Major League Baseball draft.

=== Opening Day lineup ===
2	Jerry Remy	2B
24	Dwight Evans	RF
26	Wade Boggs	3B
14	Jim Rice	LF
7	Mike Easler	DH
20	Tony Armas	CF
10	Rich Gedman	C
11	Dave Stapleton	1B
18	Glenn Hoffman	SS
47	Bruce Hurst	P

The Red Sox were defeated on Opening Day by the California Angels, 2–1, with both Angel runs scoring with two outs in the ninth on an error by Boston shortstop Jackie Gutiérrez.

=== Roster ===
1984 Boston Red Sox
Roster
Pitchers: 23 Oil Can Boyd; 27 Mike Brown; 25 Mark Clear; 21 Roger Clemens; 28 Steve Crawford; 44 Jim Dorsey; 43 Dennis Eckersley; 30 Rich Gale; 47 Bruce Hurst; 48 John Henry Johnson; 38 Charlie Mitchell; 49 Al Nipper; 19 Bob Ojeda; 46 Bob Stanley	Catchers: 39 Gary Allenson; 10 Rich Gedman; 5 Jeff Newman; 15 Marc Sullivan; Infielders: 17 Marty Barrett; 26 Wade Boggs; 16 Bill Buckner; 41 Jackie Gutiérrez; 18 Glenn Hoffman; 22 Ed Jurak; 2 Jerry Remy; 11 Dave Stapleton; 1 Chico Walker	Outfielders: 20 Tony Armas; 24 Dwight Evans; 3 Rick Miller; 51 Reid Nichols; 14 Jim Rice; Other batters: 7 Mike Easler	Manager: 35 Ralph Houk; Coaches: 32 Tommy Harper (First base); 33 Walt Hriniak (Bullpen); 6 Johnny Pesky (Hitting); 34 Lee Stange (Pitching); 36 Eddie Yost (Third base)

== Player stats ==
=== Batting ===
Note: G = Games played; AB = At bats; R = Runs; H = Hits; 2B = Doubles; 3B = Triples; HR = Home runs; RBI = Runs batted in; SB = Stolen bases; BB = Walks; AVG = Batting average; SLG = Slugging average

Player	G	AB	R	H	2B	3B	HR	RBI	SB	BB	AVG	SLG
Jim Rice	159	657	98	184	25	7	28	122	4	44	.280	.467
Tony Armas	157	639	107	171	29	5	43	123	1	32	.268	.531
Dwight Evans	162	630	121	186	37	8	32	104	3	96	.295	.532
Wade Boggs	158	625	109	203	31	4	6	55	3	89	.325	.416
Mike Easler	156	601	87	188	31	5	27	91	1	58	.313	.516
Marty Barrett	139	475	56	144	23	3	3	45	5	42	.303	.383
Rich Gedman	133	449	54	121	26	4	24	72	0	29	.269	.506
Jackie Gutiérrez	151	449	55	118	12	3	2	29	12	15	.263	.316
Bill Buckner	114	439	51	122	21	2	11	67	2	24	.278	.410
Reid Nichols	74	124	14	28	5	1	1	14	2	12	.226	.306
Rick Miller	95	123	17	32	5	1	0	12	1	17	.260	.317
Jerry Remy	30	104	8	26	1	1	0	8	4	7	.250	.279
Gary Allenson	35	83	9	19	2	0	2	8	0	9	.229	.325
Glenn Hoffman	64	74	8	14	4	0	0	4	0	5	.189	.243
Ed Jurak	47	66	6	16	3	1	1	7	0	12	.242	.364
Jeff Newman	24	63	5	14	2	0	1	3	0	5	.222	.302
Dave Stapleton	13	39	4	9	2	0	0	1	0	3	.231	.282
Marc Sullivan	2	6	1	3	0	0	0	1	0	1	.500	.500
Chico Walker	3	2	0	0	0	0	0	1	0	0	.000	.000
Team totals	162	5648	810	1598	259	45	181	767	38	500	.283	.441

=== Pitching ===
Note: W = Wins; L = Losses; ERA = Earned run average; G = Games pitched; GS = Games started; SV = Saves; IP = Innings pitched; H = Hits allowed; R = Runs allowed; ER = Earned runs allowed; BB = Walks allowed; SO = Strikeouts

Player	W	L	ERA	G	GS	SV	IP	H	R	ER	BB	SO
Bruce Hurst	12	12	3.92	33	33	0	218.0	232	106	95	88	136
Bob Ojeda	12	12	3.99	33	32	0	216.2	211	106	96	96	137
Oil Can Boyd	12	12	4.37	29	26	0	197.2	207	109	96	53	134
Al Nipper	11	6	3.89	29	24	0	182.2	183	86	79	52	84
Roger Clemens	9	4	4.32	21	20	0	133.1	146	67	64	29	126
Bob Stanley	9	10	3.54	57	0	22	106.2	113	57	42	23	52
Mike Brown	1	8	6.85	15	11	0	67.0	104	63	51	19	32
Mark Clear	8	3	4.03	47	0	8	67.0	47	38	30	70	76
Dennis Eckersley	4	4	5.01	9	9	0	64.2	71	38	36	13	33
John Henry Johnson	1	2	3.53	30	3	1	63.2	64	26	25	27	57
Steve Crawford	5	0	3.34	35	0	1	62.0	69	31	23	21	21
Rich Gale	2	3	5.56	13	4	0	43.2	57	27	27	18	28
Charlie Mitchell	0	0	2.76	10	0	0	16.1	14	7	5	6	7
Jim Dorsey	0	0	10.13	2	0	0	2.2	6	3	3	2	4
Team totals	86	76	4.18	162	162	32	1442.0	1524	764	669	517	927

== Game log ==
=== Regular season ===
1984 regular season game log: 86–76 (Home: 41–40; Away: 45–36)
April: 9–13 (Home: 4–7; Away: 5–6)

#	Date	Time (ET)	Opponent	Score	Win	Loss	Save	Time of Game	Attendance	Record	Box/ Streak
9	April 13	2:05 p.m. EST	Tigers	9–13	Bair (1–0)	**Hurst** (1–2)	–	3:11	35,179	3–6	L4
—	April 15		Tigers	**Postponed (Rain)** (Makeup date: August 6)							
—	April 16		Tigers	**Postponed (Rain)** (Makeup date: August 7)							

May: 12–13 (Home: 5–5; Away: 7–8)

#	Date	Time (ET)	Opponent	Score	Win	Loss	Save	Time of Game	Attendance	Record	Box/ Streak
23	May 1	7:35 p.m. EDT	@ Tigers	2–11	Wilcox (3–0)	**Hurst** (3–3)	–	2:31	17,495	9–14	L2
24	May 2	7:35 p.m. EDT	@ Tigers	5–4	**Brown** (1–2)	Berenguer (1–1)	**Stanley** (4)	2:33	23,085	10–14	W1
25	May 3	1:30 p.m. EDT	@ Tigers	1–0	**Ojeda** (2–2)	Morris (5–1)	–	2:18	22,617	11–14	W2

June: 15–14 (Home: 8–9; Away: 7–5)

#	Date	Time (ET)	Opponent	Score	Win	Loss	Save	Time of Game	Attendance	Record	Box/ Streak

July: 18–9 (Home: 8–3; Away: 10–6)

#	Date	Time (ET)	Opponent	Score	Win	Loss	Save	Time of Game	Attendance	Record	Box/ Streak
**55th All-Star Game in San Francisco, CA**
98	July 27	5:30 p.m. EDT	@ Tigers	1–9	Petry (14–4)	**Hurst** (10–6)	–	2:30	N/A	51–47	L1
99	July 27	8:35 p.m. EDT	@ Tigers	4–0	**Ojeda** (9–7)	Abbott (3–3)	–	2:22	49,607	52–47	W1
100	July 28	7:35 p.m. EDT	@ Tigers	3–2	**Stanley** (7–6)	Morris (13–7)	**Clear** (3)	2:58	49,372	53–47	W2
101	July 29	1:30 p.m. EDT	@ Tigers	0–3	Wilcox (11–6)	**Boyd** (5–8)	Hernández (21)	2:09	42,013	53–48	L1

August: 17–14 (Home: 11–8; Away: 6–6)

#	Date	Time (ET)	Opponent	Score	Win	Loss	Save	Time of Game	Attendance	Record	Box/ Streak
108	August 6	5:35 p.m. EDT	Tigers	7–9	López (8–0)	**Ojeda** (9–9)	Hernández (23)	3:17	N/A	56–52	L1
109	August 6	9:27 p.m. EDT	Tigers	10–2	**Clemens** (6–4)	Willis (0–2)	–	2:55	31,055	57–52	W1
110	August 7	5:35 p.m. EDT	Tigers	12–7	**Hurst** (11–6)	Morris (14–8)	**Clear** (5)		N/A	58–52	W2
111	August 7	8:59 p.m. EDT	Tigers	5–7 (11)	López (9–0)	**Gale** (1–3)	Hernández (24)	3:33	32,120	58–53	L1
112	August 8	7:35 p.m. EDT	Tigers	8–0	**Boyd** (7–8)	Abbott (3–4)	–	2:28	32,563	59–53	W1

September: 15–13 (Home: 5–8; Away: 10–5)

#	Date	Time (ET)	Opponent	Score	Win	Loss	Save	Time of Game	Attendance	Record	Box/ Streak

Legend: = Win = Loss = Postponement
Bold = Red Sox team member

== Statistical leaders ==
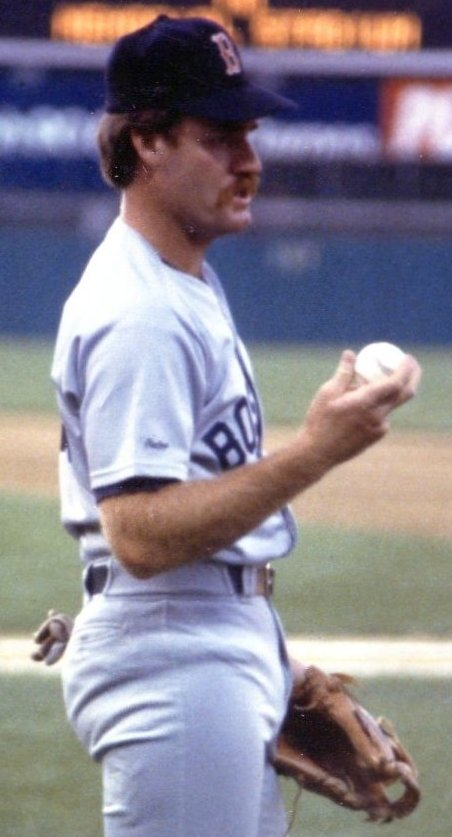
Wade Boggs

Category	Player	Statistic
Youngest player	Roger Clemens	21
Oldest player	Rick Miller	36
Wins Above Replacement	Wade Boggs	6.3

=== Batting ===
Abbr.	Category	Player	Statistic
G	Games played	Dwight Evans	162
PA	Plate appearances	Dwight Evans	738
AB	At bats	Jim Rice	657
R	Runs scored	Dwight Evans	121
H	Hits	Wade Boggs	203
2B	Doubles	Dwight Evans	37
3B	Triples	Dwight Evans	8
HR	Home runs	Tony Armas	43
RBI	Runs batted in	Tony Armas	123
SB	Stolen bases	Jackie Gutiérrez	12
CS	Caught stealing	Jackie Gutiérrez	5
BB	Base on balls	Dwight Evans	96
SO	Strikeouts	Tony Armas	156
BA	Batting average	Wade Boggs	.325
OBP	On-base percentage	Wade Boggs	.407
SLG	Slugging percentage	Dwight Evans	.532
OPS	On-base plus slugging	Dwight Evans	.920
OPS+	Adjusted OPS	Dwight Evans	147
TB	Total bases	Tony Armas	339
GIDP	Grounded into double play	Jim Rice	36
HBP	Hit by pitch	Bill Buckner	5
SH	Sacrifice hits	Jackie Gutiérrez	12
SF	Sacrifice flies	Tony Armas	7
SF	Sacrifice flies	Dwight Evans	7
IBB	Intentional base on balls	Tony Armas	9

=== Pitching ===
Abbr.	Category	Player	Statistic
W	Wins	Oil Can Boyd	12
W	Wins	Bruce Hurst	12
W	Wins	Bob Ojeda	12
L	Losses	Oil Can Boyd	12
L	Losses	Bruce Hurst	12
L	Losses	Bob Ojeda	12
W-L %	Winning percentage	Mark Clear	.727 (8–3)
ERA	Earned run average	Al Nipper	3.89
G	Games pitched	Bob Stanley	57
GS	Games started	Bruce Hurst	33
GF	Games finished	Bob Stanley	47
CG	Complete games	Oil Can Boyd	10
SHO	Shutouts	Bob Ojeda	5
SV	Saves	Bob Stanley	22
IP	Innings pitched	Bruce Hurst	218
SO	Strikeouts	Bob Ojeda	137
WHIP	Walks plus hits per inning pitched	Al Nipper	1.286

== Awards and honors ==
- Tony Armas – Silver Slugger Award (OF), AL Player of the Month (June)
- Roger Clemens – AL Pitcher of the Month (August)
- Dwight Evans – Gold Glove Award (OF)
- Jim Rice – Silver Slugger Award (OF)

All-Star Game

- Tony Armas, reserve OF
- Jim Rice, reserve OF

== Farm system ==
Level	Team	League	Manager
AAA	Pawtucket Red Sox	International League	Tony Torchia
AA	New Britain Red Sox	Eastern League	Rac Slider
A	Winston-Salem Spirits	Carolina League	Bill Slack
A	Winter Haven Red Sox	Florida State League	Dave Holt
A-Short Season	Elmira Pioneers	New York–Penn League	Dick Berardino

LEAGUE CHAMPIONS: Pawtucket
