= 1984 Baltimore Orioles season =

Major League Baseball season

1984 Baltimore Orioles
- League: American League
- Division: East
- Ballpark: Memorial Stadium
- City: Baltimore, Maryland
- Record: 85–77 (.525)
- Divisional place: 5th
- Owners: Edward Bennett Williams
- General managers: Hank Peters
- Managers: Joe Altobelli
- Television: WMAR-TV (Rex Barney, Brooks Robinson, Mel Proctor); Home Team Sports (Rex Barney, Mel Proctor)
- Radio: WFBR (Jon Miller, Tom Marr)

The 1984 Baltimore Orioles season was the 84th season in Baltimore Orioles franchise history, the 31st in Baltimore, and the 31st at Memorial Stadium. The Orioles finished fifth in the American League East with a record of 85 wins and 77 losses.

== Offseason ==
- February 7, 1984: Tom Underwood was signed as a free agent with the Baltimore Orioles.

== Regular season ==
- May 6, 1984: Cal Ripken Jr. hit for the cycle in a game against the Texas Rangers.
- Cal Ripken Jr. set an American League record for most assists by a shortstop with 583.
- During the season, Mike Boddicker became the last pitcher to win at least 20 games in one season for the Orioles in the 20th century.

=== Season standings ===
AL East
Team	W	L	Pct.	GB	Home	Road
Detroit Tigers	104	58	.642	—	53‍–‍29	51‍–‍29
Toronto Blue Jays	89	73	.549	15	49‍–‍32	40‍–‍41
New York Yankees	87	75	.537	17	51‍–‍30	36‍–‍45
Boston Red Sox	86	76	.531	18	41‍–‍40	45‍–‍36
Baltimore Orioles	85	77	.525	19	44‍–‍37	41‍–‍40
Cleveland Indians	75	87	.463	29	41‍–‍39	34‍–‍48
Milwaukee Brewers	67	94	.416	36½	38‍–‍43	29‍–‍51

=== Record vs. opponents ===
1984 American League record Sources:
Team	BAL	BOS	CAL	CWS	CLE	DET	KC	MIL	MIN	NYY	OAK	SEA	TEX	TOR
Baltimore	—	6–7	8–4	7–5	7–6	7–6	5–7	7–6	5–7	5–8	6–6	9–3	9–3	4–9
Boston	7–6	—	9–3	7–5	10–3	7–6	3–9	9–4	6–6	7–6	7–5	4–8	5–7	5–8
California	4–8	3–9	—	8–5	8–4	4–8	6–7	8–4	4–9	8–4	7–6	9–4	5–8	7–5
Chicago	5–7	5–7	5–8	—	8–4	4–8	5–8	7–5	8–5	7–5	6–7	5–8	5–8	4–8
Cleveland	6–7	3–10	4–8	4–8	—	4–9	6–6	9–4	7–5	2–11	7–5	8–4	9–3	6–7–1
Detroit	6–7	6–7	8–4	8–4	9–4	—	7–5	11–2	9–3	7–6	9–3	6–6	10–2	8–5
Kansas City	7–5	9–3	7–6	8–5	6–6	5–7	—	6–6	6–7	5–7	5–8	9–4	6–7	5–7
Milwaukee	6–7	4–9	4–8	5–7	4–9	2–11	6–6	—	5–7	6–7	4–8	6–6	5–6	10–3
Minnesota	7–5	6–6	9–4	5–8	5–7	3–9	7–6	7–5	—	8–4	8–5	7–6	8–5	1–11
New York	8–5	6–7	4–8	5–7	11–2	6–7	7–5	7–6	4–8	—	8–4	7–5	6–6	8–5
Oakland	6–6	5–7	6–7	7–6	5–7	3–9	8–5	8–4	5–8	4–8	—	8–5	8–5	4–8
Seattle	3–9	8–4	4–9	8–5	4–8	6–6	4–9	6–6	6–7	5–7	5–8	—	10–3	5–7
Texas	3–9	7–5	8–5	8–5	3–9	2–10	7–6	6–5	5–8	6–6	5–8	3–10	—	6–6
Toronto	9–4	8–5	5–7	8–4	7–6–1	5–8	7–5	3–10	11–1	5–8	8–4	7–5	6–6	—

=== Opening Day starters ===
- Rich Dauer
- Rick Dempsey
- Dan Ford
- Wayne Gross
- John Lowenstein
- Scott McGregor
- Eddie Murray
- Cal Ripken Jr.
- John Shelby
- Ken Singleton

=== Notable transactions ===
- August 14, 1984: Ron Jackson was signed as a free agent by the Orioles.

=== Roster ===
1984 Baltimore Orioles roster
Roster
Pitchers: 52 Mike Boddicker; 21,59 Mark Brown; 34 Storm Davis; 39 Ken Dixon; 46 Mike Flanagan; 30 Dennis Martínez; 23 Tippy Martinez; 16 Scott McGregor; 41 John Pacella; 22 Jim Palmer; 36 Nate Snell; 53 Sammy Stewart; 32 Bill Swaggerty; 42 Tom Underwood	Catchers: 24 Rick Dempsey; 6 Floyd Rayford; 41 Orlando Sánchez; Infielders: 10 Todd Cruz; 25 Rich Dauer; 14 Wayne Gross; 11 Ron Jackson; 33 Eddie Murray; 8 Cal Ripken Jr.; 2 Vic Rodriguez; 12 Lenn Sakata	Outfielders: 1 Al Bumbry; 9,28 Jim Dwyer; 15 Dan Ford; 38 John Lowenstein; 35 Gary Roenicke; 18 Larry Sheets; 37 John Shelby; 43 Mike Young; Other batters: 27 Benny Ayala; 17 Joe Nolan; 29 Ken Singleton; 28 Jim Traber	Manager: 26 Joe Altobelli; Coaches: 44 Elrod Hendricks; 31 Ray Miller; 47 Cal Ripken, Sr.; 54 Ralph Rowe; 40 Jimmy Williams

== Player stats ==
=== Batting ===
==== Starters by position ====
Note: Pos = Position; G = Games played; AB = At bats; H = Hits; Avg. = Batting average; HR = Home runs; RBI = Runs batted in

Pos	Player	G	AB	R	H	Avg.	HR
C	Rick Dempsey	109	330	76	.230	11	34
1B	Eddie Murray	162	588	180	.306	29	110
2B	Rich Dauer	127	397	101	.254	2	24
SS	Cal Ripken Jr.	162	641	195	.304	27	86
3B	Wayne Gross	127	342	74	.216	22	64
LF	Gary Roenicke	121	326	73	.224	10	44
CF	John Shelby	128	383	80	.209	6	30
RF	Mike Young	123	401	101	.252	17	52
DH	Ken Singleton	111	363	78	.215	6	36

==== Other batters ====
Note: G = Games played; AB = At bats; H = Hits; Avg. = Batting average; HR = Home runs; RBI = Runs batted in

Player	G	AB	H	Avg.	HR	RBI
Al Bumbry	119	344	93	.270	3	24
John Lowenstein	105	270	64	.237	8	28
Floyd Rayford	86	250	64	.256	4	27
Jim Dwyer	76	161	41	.255	2	21
Lenn Sakata	81	157	30	.191	3	11
Todd Cruz	95	142	31	.218	3	9
Benny Ayala	60	118	25	.212	4	24
Dan Ford	25	91	21	.231	1	5
Joe Nolan	35	62	18	.290	1	9
Ron Jackson	12	28	8	.286	0	2
Jim Traber	10	21	5	.238	0	2
Vic Rodriguez	11	17	7	.412	0	2
Larry Sheets	8	16	7	.438	1	2
Orlando Sánchez	4	8	2	.250	0	1

=== Pitching ===
==== Starting pitchers ====
Note: G = Games pitched; IP = Innings pitched; W = Wins; L = Losses; ERA = Earned run average; SO = Strikeouts

Player	G	IP	W	L	ERA	BB
Mike Boddicker	34	261.1	20	11	2.79	128
Mike Flanagan	34	226.2	13	13	3.53	115
Storm Davis	35	225.0	14	9	3.12	105
Scott McGregor	30	196.1	15	12	3.94	67
Ken Dixon	2	13.0	0	1	4.15	8

==== Other pitchers ====
Note: G = Games pitched; IP = Innings pitched; W = Wins; L = Losses; ERA = Earned run average; SO = Strikeouts

Player	G	IP	W	L	ERA	SO
Dennis Martínez	34	141.2	6	9	5.02	77
Bill Swaggerty	23	57.0	3	2	5.21	18
Jim Palmer	5	17.2	0	3	9.17	4
John Pacella	6	14.2	0	1	6.75	8

==== Relief pitchers ====
Note: G = Games pitched; W = Wins; L = Losses; SV = Saves; ERA = Earned run average; SO = Strikeouts

Player	G	W	L	SV	ERA	SO
Tippy Martinez	55	4	9	17	3.91	72
Sammy Stewart	60	7	4	13	3.29	56
Tom Underwood	37	1	0	1	3.52	39
Mark Brown	9	1	2	0	3.91	10
Nate Snell	5	1	1	0	2.35	7
Todd Cruz	1	0	0	0	0.00	0

== Farm system ==
Level	Team	League	Manager
AAA	Rochester Red Wings	International League	Frank Verdi
AA	Charlotte O's	Southern League	Grady Little and John Hart
A	Hagerstown Suns	Carolina League	John Hart, Grady Little and Len Johnston
A-Short Season	Newark Orioles	New York–Penn League	Jim Hutto
Rookie	Bluefield Orioles	Appalachian League	Greg Biagini

LEAGUE CHAMPIONS: Charlotte

== Japan tour ==
The Orioles made its second Yomiuri Shimbun-sponsored tour of Japan since 1971. The newspaper received approval from MLB on December 29, 1982, to invite the winner of the 1983 World Series to play 15 games against Nippon Professional Baseball competition, primarily the 1984 Japan Series champion. Yomiuri owner Tōru Shōriki originally wanted to invite the 1984 World Series winner, but eventually agreed to MLB Commissioner Bowie Kuhn's suggestion of the previous year's World Series champion. The exhibition matches were intended to be part of the golden jubilee celebration for the Yomiuri Giants which was owned by the tour's sponsor and another attempt by Shōriki for his team to make a legitimate claim at being world champions of the sport.

The Orioles accepted the invitation on January 2, 1984, 2 1/2 months after winning the 1983 World Series. The Yomiuri was eventually left disappointed when both the Orioles and its Giants failed to qualify for the postseason with fifth- and third-place finishes respectively. Instead of the Giants for which the event's organizers had hoped, the opponent in the first five matches was the 1984 Japan Series champion Hiroshima Toyo Carp.

Eight of the games featured both players who surpassed Lou Gehrig's consecutive games played streak. Cal Ripken Jr. and Sachio Kinugasa batted .219 and .143 respectively.

The fifteenth and final exhibition contest originally scheduled for November 15 in Baltimore's sister city Kawasaki was cancelled due to rain. Upon the Orioles' arrival in Tokyo on October 25, manager Joe Altobelli said he wanted his team to win at least 10 games. The Orioles finished the tour with an 8–5–1 record, including 4–1 each in head-to-head competition against the Giants and Carp.

Game	Month	Date	Day	Place	Opponent	W/L/D	Score	Orioles Pitcher of Record	Notes
1	OCT	27	SA	Tokyo	Hiroshima Toyo Carp	L	0–1	Mike Boddicker	Winning pitcher Kazuhisa Kawaguchi singles in the game's only run in the second.
2	OCT	28	SU	Tokyo	Hiroshima Toyo Carp	W	5–3	Nate Snell	
3	OCT	30	TU	Tokorozawa	Hiroshima Toyo Carp	W	5–3	Bill Swaggerty	
4	OCT	31	W	Yokohama	Hiroshima Toyo Carp	W	7–5	Nate Snell	Four-run rally erases 5–3 deficit with two outs in the ninth.
5	NOV	1	TH	Osaka	Hiroshima Toyo Carp	W	5–2	Mike Flanagan	
6	NOV	3	SA	Tokyo	Yomiuri Giants	W	7–4	Storm Davis	
7	NOV	4	SU	Nishinomiya	Japan All-Stars	L	4–5	Mike Boddicker	
8	NOV	6	TU	Okayama	Japan All-Stars	L	7–8	Sammy Stewart	5–2 lead disappears after giving up six runs in the eighth.
9	NOV	7	W	Hiroshima	Yomiuri Giants/Hiroshima Toyo Carp	D	5–5	–	
10	NOV	9	F	Kumamoto	Yomiuri Giants	W	11–6	Nate Snell	
11	NOV	10	SA	Kitakyushu	Yomiuri Giants	W	9–8	Tom Underwood	
12	NOV	11	SU	Fukuoka	Yomiuri Giants	W	13–9	Nate Snell	
13	NOV	13	TU	Nagoya	Yomiuri Giants/Chunichi Dragons	L	4–8	Dennis Martínez	All four runs score on homers by John Lowenstein, Eddie Murray and Cal Ripken Jr.
14	NOV	14	W	Shizuoka	Yomiuri Giants	L	5–10	Mike Flanagan	

Source: Baltimore Orioles 1985 Media Guide (scroll down to pages 43 through 46).

== Bibliography ==
- Johnson, Lloyd; Wolff, Miles, eds. (1997). The Encyclopedia of Minor League Baseball (2nd ed.). Durham, North Carolina: Baseball America. ISBN 978-0-9637189-8-3.
