= 1984 Kansas City Royals season =

1984 Kansas City Royals
- American League West champions
- League: American League
- Division: West
- Ballpark: Royals Stadium
- City: Kansas City, Missouri
- Record: 84–78 (.519)
- Divisional place: 1st
- Owners: Ewing Kauffman
- General managers: John Schuerholz
- Managers: Dick Howser
- Television: WDAF-TV 4 (Denny Matthews, Denny Trease, Fred White); Sports Time (Phil Stone, Dwayne Mosley)
- Radio: WIBW–AM 580; KCMO–AM 810 (Denny Matthews, Fred White)

The 1984 Kansas City Royals season was their 16th in Major League Baseball. The Royals won the American League West with a record of 84–78, but lost to the eventual World Series champion Detroit Tigers 3–0 in the ALCS. Dan Quisenberry's 44 saves paced the American League.

== Offseason ==
- October 17, 1983: Eric Rasmussen was released by the Royals.
- December 8, 1983: Mike Armstrong and Duane Dewey (minors) were traded by the Royals to the New York Yankees for Steve Balboni and Roger Erickson.
- December 8, 1983: Joe Beckwith was traded by the Los Angeles Dodgers to the Kansas City Royals for Joe Szekeley (minors), John Serritella (minors) and José Torres (minors).
- January 17, 1984: Steve Carter was drafted by the Kansas City Royals in the 2nd round of the 1984 amateur draft (January Secondary), but did not sign.
- March 31, 1984: Don Werner and Derek Botelho were traded by the Royals to the Chicago Cubs for Alan Hargesheimer.

== Regular season ==
- September 17, 1984: Reggie Jackson of the California Angels hit the 500th home run of his career against the Royals. It was the 17th anniversary of the day he hit his first home run. Jackson hit his 500th, at Anaheim Stadium off Bud Black of the Royals.

=== Season standings ===
AL West
| Team | W | L | Pct. | GB | Home | Road |
|---|---|---|---|---|---|---|
| Kansas City Royals | 84 | 78 | .519 | — | 44‍–‍37 | 40‍–‍41 |
| California Angels | 81 | 81 | .500 | 3 | 37‍–‍44 | 44‍–‍37 |
| Minnesota Twins | 81 | 81 | .500 | 3 | 47‍–‍34 | 34‍–‍47 |
| Oakland Athletics | 77 | 85 | .475 | 7 | 44‍–‍37 | 33‍–‍48 |
| Chicago White Sox | 74 | 88 | .457 | 10 | 43‍–‍38 | 31‍–‍50 |
| Seattle Mariners | 74 | 88 | .457 | 10 | 42‍–‍39 | 32‍–‍49 |
| Texas Rangers | 69 | 92 | .429 | 14½ | 34‍–‍46 | 35‍–‍46 |

=== Record vs. opponents ===
1984 American League record Sources:
| Team | BAL | BOS | CAL | CWS | CLE | DET | KC | MIL | MIN | NYY | OAK | SEA | TEX | TOR |
|---|---|---|---|---|---|---|---|---|---|---|---|---|---|---|
| Baltimore | — | 6–7 | 8–4 | 7–5 | 7–6 | 7–6 | 5–7 | 7–6 | 5–7 | 5–8 | 6–6 | 9–3 | 9–3 | 4–9 |
| Boston | 7–6 | — | 9–3 | 7–5 | 10–3 | 7–6 | 3–9 | 9–4 | 6–6 | 7–6 | 7–5 | 4–8 | 5–7 | 5–8 |
| California | 4–8 | 3–9 | — | 8–5 | 8–4 | 4–8 | 6–7 | 8–4 | 4–9 | 8–4 | 7–6 | 9–4 | 5–8 | 7–5 |
| Chicago | 5–7 | 5–7 | 5–8 | — | 8–4 | 4–8 | 5–8 | 7–5 | 8–5 | 7–5 | 6–7 | 5–8 | 5–8 | 4–8 |
| Cleveland | 6–7 | 3–10 | 4–8 | 4–8 | — | 4–9 | 6–6 | 9–4 | 7–5 | 2–11 | 7–5 | 8–4 | 9–3 | 6–7–1 |
| Detroit | 6–7 | 6–7 | 8–4 | 8–4 | 9–4 | — | 7–5 | 11–2 | 9–3 | 7–6 | 9–3 | 6–6 | 10–2 | 8–5 |
| Kansas City | 7–5 | 9–3 | 7–6 | 8–5 | 6–6 | 5–7 | — | 6–6 | 6–7 | 5–7 | 5–8 | 9–4 | 6–7 | 5–7 |
| Milwaukee | 6–7 | 4–9 | 4–8 | 5–7 | 4–9 | 2–11 | 6–6 | — | 5–7 | 6–7 | 4–8 | 6–6 | 5–6 | 10–3 |
| Minnesota | 7–5 | 6–6 | 9–4 | 5–8 | 5–7 | 3–9 | 7–6 | 7–5 | — | 8–4 | 8–5 | 7–6 | 8–5 | 1–11 |
| New York | 8–5 | 6–7 | 4–8 | 5–7 | 11–2 | 6–7 | 7–5 | 7–6 | 4–8 | — | 8–4 | 7–5 | 6–6 | 8–5 |
| Oakland | 6–6 | 5–7 | 6–7 | 7–6 | 5–7 | 3–9 | 8–5 | 8–4 | 5–8 | 4–8 | — | 8–5 | 8–5 | 4–8 |
| Seattle | 3–9 | 8–4 | 4–9 | 8–5 | 4–8 | 6–6 | 4–9 | 6–6 | 6–7 | 5–7 | 5–8 | — | 10–3 | 5–7 |
| Texas | 3–9 | 7–5 | 8–5 | 8–5 | 3–9 | 2–10 | 7–6 | 6–5 | 5–8 | 6–6 | 5–8 | 3–10 | — | 6–6 |
| Toronto | 9–4 | 8–5 | 5–7 | 8–4 | 7–6–1 | 5–8 | 7–5 | 3–10 | 11–1 | 5–8 | 8–4 | 7–5 | 6–6 | — |

=== Notable transactions ===
- May 10, 1984: Dane Iorg was purchased by the Royals from the St. Louis Cardinals.

=== Roster ===
1984 Kansas City Royals roster
Roster
| Pitchers: 27 Joe Beckwith; 40 Bud Black; 23 Mark Gubicza; 32 Larry Gura; 38 Mark Huismann; 25 Danny Jackson; 17 Mike Jones; 37 Charlie Leibrandt; 29 Dan Quisenberry; 31 Bret Saberhagen; 34 Paul Splittorff; 19 Frank Wills | Catchers: 49 Luis Pujols; 49 Orlando Sánchez; 7 Don Slaught; 12 John Wathan; Infielders: 37 Tucker Ashford; 18 Steve Balboni; 1 Buddy Biancalana; 5 George Brett; 2 Onix Concepción; 21 Bucky Dent; 9 Dane Iorg; 4 Greg Pryor; 50 Jim Scranton; 30 U L Washington; 20 Frank White | Outfielders: 33 Butch Davis; 35 Lynn Jones; 58 Dave Leeper; 24 Darryl Motley; 16 Leon Roberts; 15 Pat Sheridan; 6 Willie Wilson; Other batters: 11 Hal McRae; 3 Jorge Orta | Manager: 10 Dick Howser; Coaches: 46 Howie Bedell; 43 Gary Blaylock; 41 Mike Ferraro; 42 José Martínez; 14 Lee May; 44 Jimmie Schaffer |

== Player stats ==
=== Batting ===
==== Starters by position ====
Note: Pos = Position; G = Games played; AB = At bats; H = Hits; Avg. = Batting average; HR = Home runs; RBI = Runs batted in

| Pos | Player | G | AB | H | Avg. | HR | RBI |
|---|---|---|---|---|---|---|---|
| C | Don Slaught | 124 | 409 | 108 | .264 | 4 | 42 |
| 1B | Steve Balboni | 126 | 438 | 107 | .244 | 28 | 77 |
| 2B | Frank White | 129 | 479 | 130 | .271 | 17 | 56 |
| SS | Onix Concepcion | 90 | 287 | 81 | .282 | 1 | 23 |
| 3B | George Brett | 104 | 377 | 107 | .284 | 13 | 69 |
| LF | Darryl Motley | 146 | 522 | 148 | .284 | 15 | 70 |
| CF | Willie Wilson | 128 | 541 | 163 | .301 | 2 | 44 |
| RF | Pat Sheridan | 138 | 481 | 136 | .283 | 8 | 53 |
| DH | Hal McRae | 106 | 317 | 96 | .303 | 3 | 42 |

==== Other batters ====
Note: G = Games played; AB = At bats; H = Hits; Avg. = Batting average; HR = Home runs; RBI = Runs batted in

| Player | G | AB | H | Avg. | HR | RBI |
|---|---|---|---|---|---|---|
| Jorge Orta | 122 | 403 | 120 | .298 | 9 | 50 |
| Greg Pryor | 123 | 270 | 71 | .263 | 4 | 25 |
| Dane Iorg | 78 | 235 | 60 | .255 | 5 | 30 |
| John Wathan | 97 | 171 | 31 | .181 | 2 | 10 |
| UL Washington | 63 | 170 | 38 | .224 | 1 | 10 |
| Buddy Biancalana | 66 | 134 | 26 | .194 | 2 | 9 |
| Butch Davis | 41 | 116 | 17 | .147 | 2 | 12 |
| Lynn Jones | 47 | 103 | 31 | .301 | 1 | 10 |
| Leon Roberts | 28 | 45 | 10 | .222 | 0 | 3 |
| Tucker Ashford | 9 | 13 | 2 | .154 | 0 | 0 |
| Orlando Sánchez | 10 | 10 | 1 | .100 | 0 | 2 |
| Bucky Dent | 11 | 9 | 3 | .333 | 0 | 1 |
| Dave Leeper | 4 | 6 | 0 | .000 | 0 | 0 |
| Luis Pujols | 4 | 5 | 1 | .200 | 0 | 1 |
| Jim Scranton | 2 | 2 | 0 | .000 | 0 | 0 |

=== Pitching ===
==== Starting pitchers ====
Note: G = Games pitched; IP = Innings pitched; W = Wins; L = Losses; ERA = Earned run average; SO = Strikeouts

| Player | G | IP | W | L | ERA | SO |
|---|---|---|---|---|---|---|
| Bud Black | 35 | 257.0 | 17 | 12 | 3.12 | 140 |
| Mark Gubicza | 29 | 189.0 | 10 | 14 | 4.05 | 111 |
| Larry Gura | 31 | 168.2 | 12 | 9 | 5.18 | 68 |
| Charlie Leibrandt | 23 | 143.2 | 11 | 7 | 3.63 | 53 |

==== Other pitchers ====
Note: G = Games pitched; IP = Innings pitched; W = Wins; L = Losses; ERA = Earned run average; SO = Strikeouts

| Player | G | IP | W | L | ERA | SO |
|---|---|---|---|---|---|---|
| Bret Saberhagen | 38 | 157.2 | 10 | 11 | 3.48 | 73 |
| Mike Jones | 23 | 81.0 | 2 | 3 | 4.89 | 43 |
| Danny Jackson | 15 | 76.0 | 2 | 6 | 4.26 | 40 |
| Frank Wills | 10 | 37.0 | 2 | 3 | 5.11 | 21 |
| Paul Splittorff | 12 | 28.0 | 1 | 3 | 7.71 | 4 |

==== Relief pitchers ====
Note: G = Games pitched; W = Wins; L = Losses; SV = Saves; ERA = Earned run average; SO = Strikeouts

| Player | G | W | L | SV | ERA | SO |
|---|---|---|---|---|---|---|
| Dan Quisenberry | 72 | 6 | 3 | 44 | 2.64 | 41 |
| Joe Beckwith | 49 | 8 | 4 | 2 | 3.40 | 75 |
| Mark Huismann | 13 | 2 | 1 | 0 | 5.58 | 20 |

== ALCS ==
=== Game 1 ===
October 2, Royals Stadium

| Team | 1 | 2 | 3 | 4 | 5 | 6 | 7 | 8 | 9 | R | H | E |
|---|---|---|---|---|---|---|---|---|---|---|---|---|
| Detroit | 2 | 0 | 0 | 1 | 1 | 0 | 1 | 2 | 1 | 8 | 14 | 0 |
| Kansas City | 0 | 0 | 0 | 0 | 0 | 0 | 1 | 0 | 0 | 1 | 5 | 1 |
W: Jack Morris (1–0) L: Bud Black (0–1)
HRs: DET – Larry Herndon (1) Alan Trammell (1) Lance Parrish (1)

=== Game 2 ===
October 3, Royals Stadium

| Team | 1 | 2 | 3 | 4 | 5 | 6 | 7 | 8 | 9 | 10 | 11 | R | H | E |
|---|---|---|---|---|---|---|---|---|---|---|---|---|---|---|
| Detroit | 2 | 0 | 1 | 0 | 0 | 0 | 0 | 0 | 0 | 0 | 2 | 5 | 8 | 1 |
| Kansas City | 0 | 0 | 0 | 1 | 0 | 0 | 1 | 1 | 0 | 0 | 0 | 3 | 10 | 3 |
W: Aurelio López (1–0) L: Dan Quisenberry (0–1)
HRs: DET – Kirk Gibson (1)

=== Game 3 ===
October 5, Tiger Stadium

| Team | 1 | 2 | 3 | 4 | 5 | 6 | 7 | 8 | 9 | R | H | E |
|---|---|---|---|---|---|---|---|---|---|---|---|---|
| Kansas City | 0 | 0 | 0 | 0 | 0 | 0 | 0 | 0 | 0 | 0 | 3 | 3 |
| Detroit | 0 | 1 | 0 | 0 | 0 | 0 | 0 | 0 | X | 1 | 3 | 0 |
W: Milt Wilcox (1–0) L: Charlie Leibrandt (0–1) S:Willie Hernández (1)
HRs: None

== Farm system ==
| Level | Team | League | Manager |
|---|---|---|---|
| AAA | Omaha Royals | American Association | Gene Lamont |
| AA | Memphis Chicks | Southern League | Rick Mathews |
| A | Fort Myers Royals | Florida State League | Tommy Jones |
| A | Charleston Royals | South Atlantic League | Duane Gustavson |
| A-Short Season | Eugene Emeralds | Northwest League | Dave Roberts |
