= Jeff Bettendorf =

American baseball player (born 1960)

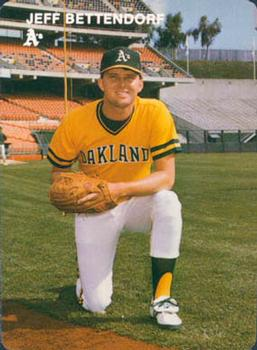
- Pitcher
- Born: December 10, 1960 (age 65); Lompoc, California, U.S.
- Batted: Right Threw: Right

MLB debut
- April 8, 1984, for the Oakland Athletics

Last MLB appearance
- April 24, 1984, for the Oakland Athletics

MLB statistics
- Win–loss record: 0–0
- Earned run average: 4.66
- Strikeouts: 5
- Stats at Baseball Reference

Teams
- Oakland Athletics (1984)

Jeffrey Allen Bettendorf (born December 10, 1960) is an American former Major League Baseball pitcher.

Bettendorf was primarily a starting pitcher over the course of his nine-season professional baseball career. He was a second-round draft selection in the 1979 Major League Baseball draft by the New York Mets. After never advancing above Double-A in the Mets system, Bettendorf was drafted by the Oakland Athletics in the December 1983 Rule 5 draft. After making the A's major league roster, as is required under Rule 5, he made his first major league appearance on April 8, 1984, against the Boston Red Sox at the Oakland Coliseum, earning a save in three no-hit scoreless innings. He would go on to pitch in a total of three games for the A's, giving up 5 runs in 9 innings. On May 9, 1984, Bettendorf was traded back to the Mets for a conditional pick and immediately optioned to the Double-A Jackson Mets. He would not return to the majors.

After a severe elbow injury in 1986 while pitching for the Double-A Columbus Astros, Bettendorf returned in 1987 to play with the Double-A Birmingham Barons, where he became a submarine pitcher, going 9–1 in 43 appearances (all in relief). That season he was named to the Southern League All-Star team (despite only 2 saves and a 4.55 ERA) and helped the Barons to the Southern League Championship series win before retiring from professional baseball. Advancing through primarily the Mets strong minor league organization of the late 70's/early 80's, Bettendorf earned five Minor League Championship rings and three Minor League All-Star selections over his career.
