= Mike Walters =

American baseball player (born 1957)

- Pitcher
- Born: October 18, 1957 (age 68); St. Louis, Missouri, U.S.
- Batted: Right Threw: Right

MLB debut
- July 8, 1983, for the Minnesota Twins

Last MLB appearance
- August 24, 1984, for the Minnesota Twins

MLB statistics
- Win–loss record: 1–4
- Earned run average: 3.99
- Strikeouts: 31
- Stats at Baseball Reference

Teams
- Minnesota Twins (1983–1984)

Michael Charles Walters (born October 18, 1957) is an American former Major League Baseball pitcher. He bats and throws right-handed.

Walters was drafted by the California Angels in the 1st round of the 1977 amateur draft. He played in 1983 and 1984 with the Minnesota Twins.
