= Víctor Mata =

Dominican baseball player

Victor Mata
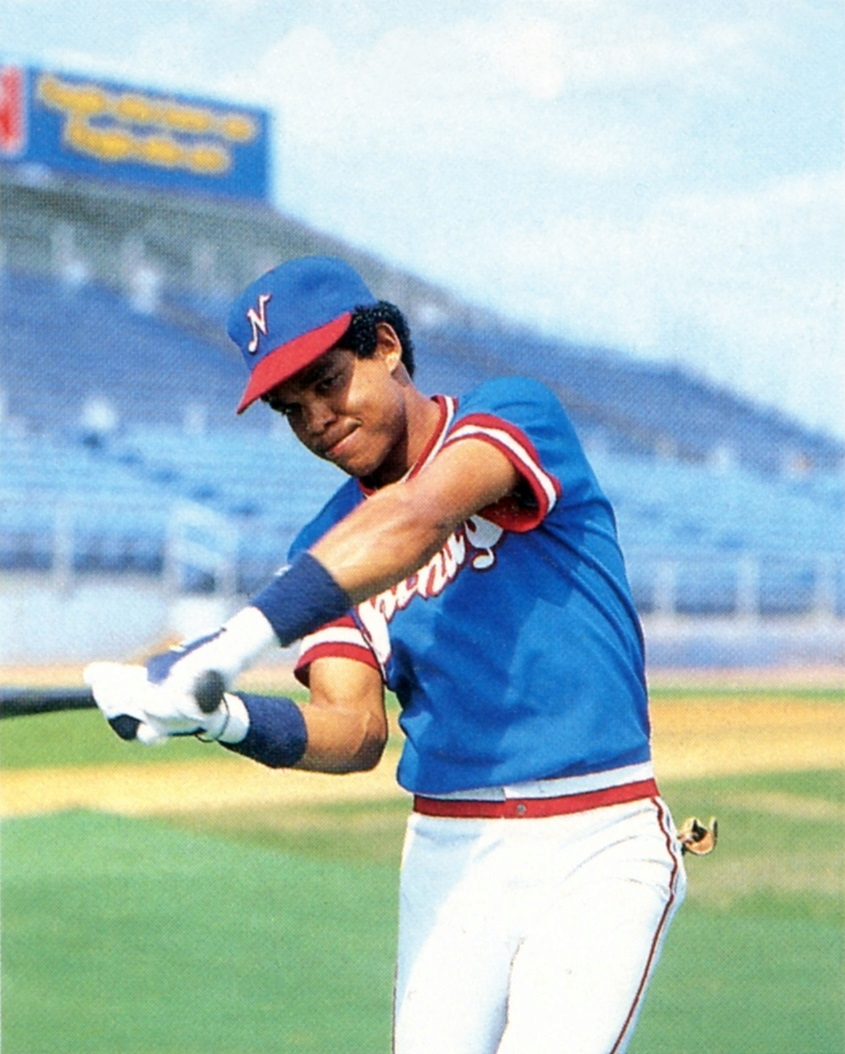
- Mata with the Nashville Sounds in 1983
- Outfielder
- Born: June 17, 1961 (age 65); Santiago, Dominican Republic
- Batted: Right Threw: Right

MLB debut
- July 22, 1984, for the New York Yankees

Last MLB appearance
- June 11, 1985, for the New York Yankees

MLB statistics
- Batting average: .312
- Runs: 9
- Hits: 24
- Stats at Baseball Reference

Teams
- New York Yankees (1984–1985)

Victor Jose Mata Abreu (born June 17, 1961) is a Dominican former Major League Baseball (MLB) outfielder. He played during two seasons at the major league level for the New York Yankees. He was signed by the Yankees as an amateur free agent in 1978. He played his first professional season with their Class-A (Short Season) Oneonta Yankees in 1978, and his last with the Baltimore Orioles' Triple-A Rochester Red Wings in 1988.
