= Ed Hodge =

American baseball player (born 1958)

- Pitcher
- Born: April 19, 1958 (age 68); Bellflower, California, U.S.
- Batted: Left Threw: Left

MLB debut
- May 1, 1984, for the Minnesota Twins

Last MLB appearance
- September 28, 1984, for the Minnesota Twins

MLB statistics
- Win–loss record: 4–3
- Earned run average: 4.77
- Strikeouts: 59
- Stats at Baseball Reference

Teams
- Minnesota Twins (1984)

Ed Oliver Hodge (born April 19, 1958) is an American former professional baseball pitcher who appeared in twenty-five games for the Minnesota Twins of Major League Baseball in 1984.
