= Dave Engle =

American baseball player (born 1956)

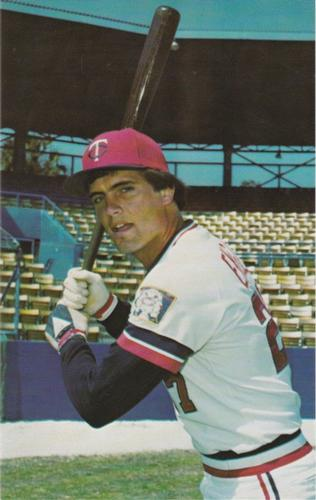
- Catcher / Right fielder / Designated hitter
- Born: November 30, 1956 (age 69); San Diego, California, U.S.
- Batted: Right Threw: Right

MLB debut
- April 14, 1981, for the Minnesota Twins

Last MLB appearance
- July 28, 1989, for the Milwaukee Brewers

MLB statistics
- Batting average: .262
- Home runs: 31
- Runs batted in: 181
- Stats at Baseball Reference

Teams
- Minnesota Twins (1981–1985); Detroit Tigers (1986); Montreal Expos (1987–1988); Milwaukee Brewers (1989)

Career highlights and awards
- All-Star (1984)

Ralph David Engle (born November 30, 1956) is an American former Major League Baseball utility player who played for the Minnesota Twins, Detroit Tigers and Milwaukee Brewers of the American League and the Montreal Expos of the National League from 1981 to 1989.

== Pro career ==
A graduate of the University of Southern California, Engle was originally drafted in the 3rd round of the 1978 amateur draft by the California Angels. On February 3, 1979, he was traded by the Angels along with Brad Havens, Paul Hartzell and Ken Landreaux to the Minnesota Twins for Rod Carew. He played catcher, first base, third base, outfield and designated hitter.

In the minor leagues, Engle won the International League batting title in 1980, beating out Wade Boggs .307 to .306. Four years later, he was selected to the American League All-Star team in 1984.

During his sophomore season, Engle became the first player to hit a home run in Minneapolis's newly opened Hubert H. Humphrey Metrodome. This occurred on opening day, April 6, 1982, and also marked the first hit, run scored, and RBI in the stadium's history.

Engle is the brother in-law of his former Twins teammate, Tom Brunansky.
