= Curt Brown (baseball) =

American baseball player (born 1960)

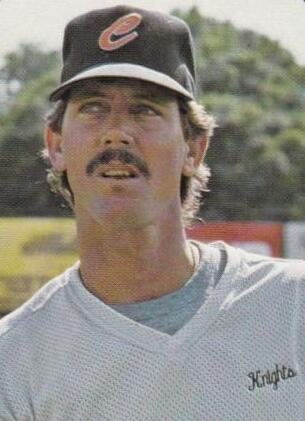
- Brown with the Charlotte Knights c. 1988
- Pitcher
- Born: January 15, 1960 (age 65); Ft. Lauderdale, Florida, U.S.
- Batted: Right Threw: Right

MLB debut
- June 10, 1983, for the California Angels

Last MLB appearance
- June 14, 1987, for the Montreal Expos

MLB statistics
- Win–loss record: 2–4
- Earned run average: 4.88
- Strikeouts: 27
- Stats at Baseball Reference

Teams
- California Angels (1983); New York Yankees (1984); Montreal Expos (1986–1987)

Curtis Steven Brown (born January 15, 1960) is an American former professional baseball pitcher. He played parts of four seasons in Major League Baseball (MLB) between 1983 and 1987, as a member of the California Angels, New York Yankees, and Montreal Expos.
