= 1984 Major League Baseball All-Star Game =

1984 American baseball competition

	1	2	3	4	5	6	7	8	9	R	H	E
American League	0	1	0	0	0	0	0	0	0	1	7	2
National League	1	1	0	0	0	0	0	1	X	3	8	0
- Date: July 10, 1984
- Venue: Candlestick Park
- City: San Francisco
- Managers: Joe Altobelli (BAL); Paul Owens (PHI)
- MVP: Gary Carter (MON)
- Attendance: 57,756
- Ceremonial first pitch: Carl Hubbell
- Television: ABC
- TV announcers: Al Michaels, Howard Cosell and Earl Weaver
- Radio: CBS
- Radio announcers: Brent Musburger, Jerry Coleman and Johnny Bench

The 1984 Major League Baseball All-Star Game was the 55th midseason exhibition between the all-stars of the American League (AL) and the National League (NL), the two leagues comprising Major League Baseball. The game was played on July 10, 1984, at Candlestick Park in San Francisco, home of the San Francisco Giants of the National League. The game resulted in a 3–1 victory for the NL.

== Roster ==
Players in italics have since been inducted into the National Baseball Hall of Fame.

=== American League All-Stars ===
- Joe Altobelli: Baltimore Orioles manager

==== Starters ====
- C Lance Parrish: Detroit Tigers
- 1B Rod Carew: California Angels
- 2B Lou Whitaker: Detroit Tigers
- 3B George Brett: Kansas City Royals
- SS Cal Ripken Jr.: Baltimore Orioles
- LF Dave Winfield: New York Yankees
- CF Chet Lemon: Detroit Tigers
- RF Reggie Jackson: California Angels
- P Dave Stieb: Toronto Blue Jays

==== Pitchers ====
- Mike Boddicker: Baltimore Orioles
- Bill Caudill: Oakland Athletics
- Richard Dotson: Chicago White Sox
- Willie Hernández: Detroit Tigers
- Jack Morris: Detroit Tigers
- Phil Niekro: New York Yankees
- Dan Quisenberry: Kansas City Royals

==== Reserves ====
- C Dave Engle: Minnesota Twins
- C Jim Sundberg: Milwaukee Brewers
- 1B Alvin Davis: Seattle Mariners
- 1B Don Mattingly: New York Yankees
- 2B Damaso Garcia: Toronto Blue Jays
- 3B Buddy Bell: Texas Rangers
- SS Alfredo Griffin: Toronto Blue Jays
- SS Alan Trammell: Detroit Tigers
- OF Tony Armas: Boston Red Sox
- OF Rickey Henderson: Oakland Athletics
- OF Jim Rice: Boston Red Sox
- DH Eddie Murray: Baltimore Orioles
- DH Andre Thornton: Cleveland Indians

=== National League All-Stars ===
- Paul Owens: Philadelphia Phillies manager

==== Starters ====
- C Gary Carter: Montreal Expos
- 1B Steve Garvey: San Diego Padres
- 2B Ryne Sandberg: Chicago Cubs
- 3B Mike Schmidt: Philadelphia Phillies
- SS Ozzie Smith: St. Louis Cardinals
- LF Tony Gwynn: San Diego Padres
- CF Dale Murphy: Atlanta Braves
- RF Darryl Strawberry: New York Mets
- P Charlie Lea: Montreal Expos

==== Pitchers ====
- Joaquín Andújar: St. Louis Cardinals
- Dwight Gooden: New York Mets
- Rich Gossage: San Diego Padres
- Al Holland: Philadelphia Phillies
- Jesse Orosco: New York Mets
- Mario Soto: Cincinnati Reds
- Bruce Sutter: St. Louis Cardinals
- Fernando Valenzuela: Los Angeles Dodgers

==== Reserves ====
- C Bob Brenly: San Francisco Giants
- C Jody Davis: Chicago Cubs
- C Tony Peña: Pittsburgh Pirates
- 1B Keith Hernandez: New York Mets
- 2B Juan Samuel: Philadelphia Phillies
- 3B Tim Wallach: Montreal Expos
- SS Rafael Ramírez: Atlanta Braves
- OF Chili Davis: San Francisco Giants
- OF Mike Marshall: Los Angeles Dodgers
- OF Jerry Mumphrey: Houston Astros
- OF Tim Raines: Montreal Expos
- OF Claudell Washington: Atlanta Braves

== Umpires ==
Position	Umpire
Home Plate	Lee Weyer (NL)
First Base	Al Clark (AL)
Second Base	Dutch Rennert (NL)
Third Base	Durwood Merrill (AL)
Left Field	Fred Brocklander (NL)
Right Field	Rocky Roe (AL)

== Game summary ==
Tuesday, July 10, 1984 5:40 pm (PT) at Candlestick Park in San Francisco, California
Team	1	2	3	4	5	6	7	8	9	R	H	E
American League	0	1	0	0	0	0	0	0	0	1	7	2
National League	1	1	0	0	0	0	0	1	X	3	8	0
WP: Charlie Lea (1-0) LP: Dave Stieb (0-1) Sv: Goose Gossage (1); Home runs: AL: George Brett (1); NL: Gary Carter (1), Dale Murphy (1)

The National Leaguers drew first blood in the first off Dave Stieb when Steve Garvey singled to right and went to second on an error by Reggie Jackson. Garvey then scored on another error by catcher Lance Parrish after Dale Murphy singled. In the second, George Brett tied it with a homer off Charlie Lea, and game MVP Gary Carter quickly gave the NL the lead back with a shot off Dave Stieb.

The game would remain 2–1, NL, for five more innings with two noteworthy pitching performances by National League pitchers along the way. Fernando Valenzuela struck out Dave Winfield, Reggie Jackson, and George Brett in the fourth, and 19-year-old Dwight Gooden fanned Lance Parrish, Chet Lemon, and Alvin Davis in the fifth.

Dale Murphy added a homer in the eighth off Willie Hernández for the final 3-1 margin. Goose Gossage got the save. The game set a nine-inning All-Star Game record for most strikeouts (21)--which would be broken in 1999.

Huey Lewis and the News sang the United States National Anthem prior to the game, with the Presidio of San Francisco color guard presenting the colors and airplanes from Travis Air Force Base flying over Candlestick Park at the Anthem's conclusion.

The ceremonial first pitch ceremony featured Carl Hubbell and Stu Miller. The honorary captains of the All-Star teams were Hall of Famers Hank Greenberg (AL) and Willie McCovey (NL).
