= Cape Fear Academy =

Private school in Wilmington, North Carolina, United States

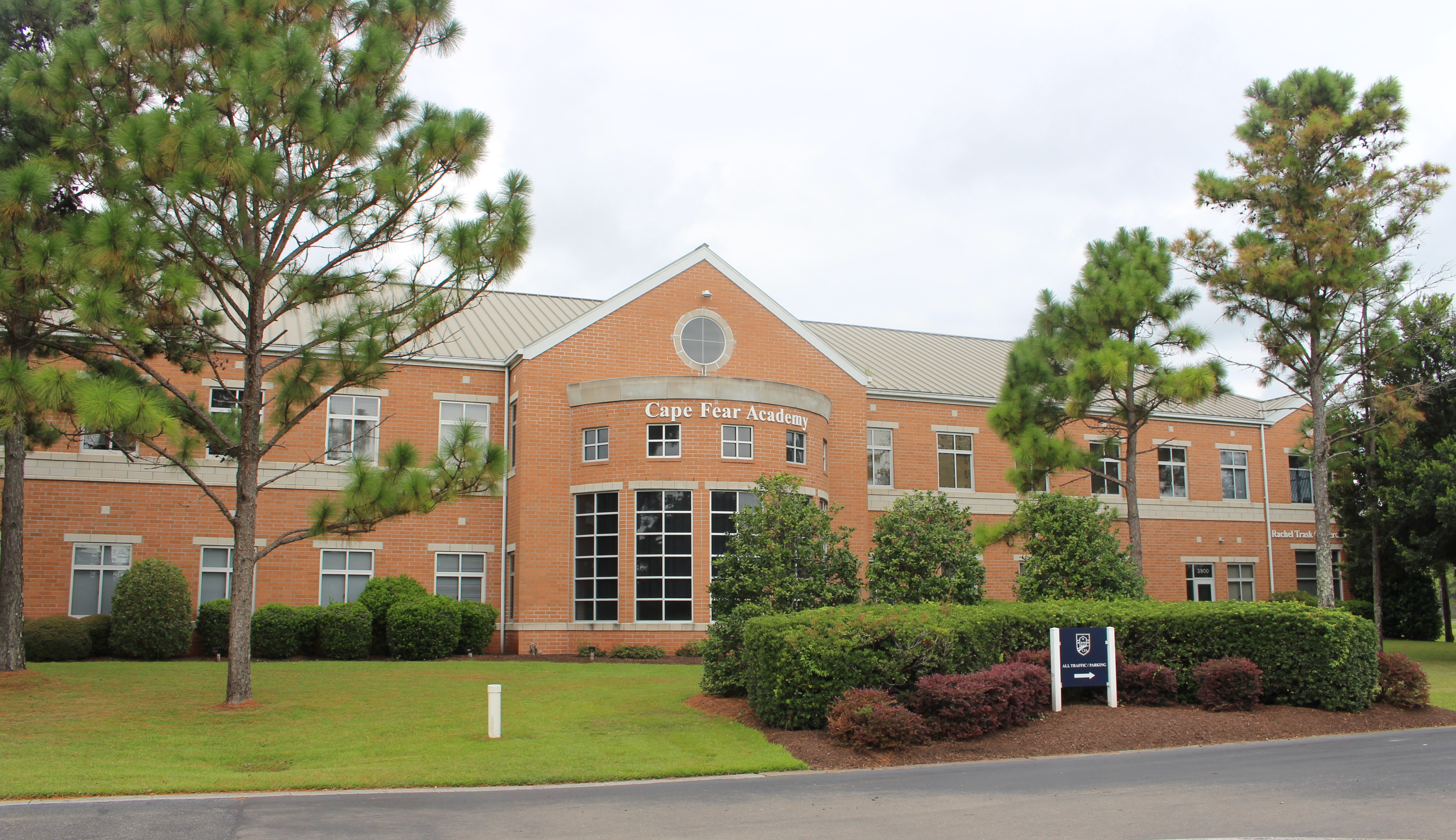

Location
- 3900 S College Road; Wilmington, North Carolina 28412; United States; 34°10′14″N 77°53′36″W

Information
- Type: Private
- Mottoes: "Go Further."; "Qui Erimus Nunc Fimus" (Latin); (What We Shall Be, Now We Are Becoming)
- Established: September 11, 1967 (59 years ago)
- CEEB code: 344347
- Headmaster: Edward M. Ellison
- Grades: PK3–12
- Gender: Co-ed
- Age range: 3 to 18
- Enrollment: 720
- Student to teacher ratio: 9:1
- Language: English
- Campus size: 37 acres (15 ha)
- Colors: Blue and gold
- Athletics: North Carolina Independent Schools Athletic Association (NCISAA)
- Mascot: Captain Fear
- Nickname: Hurricanes
- Tuition: $18,050–25,600
- Website: www.capefearacademy.org
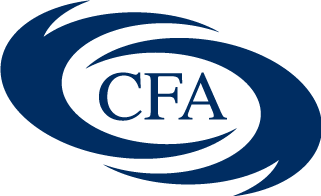

Cape Fear Academy is a private, coeducational PK3–12 school in Wilmington, North Carolina, that was established on September 11, 1967, as a segregation academy. It was named for Cape Fear Military Academy, an independent school for boys in Wilmington that operated from 1868 until 1916. The present school's first class graduated in 1971.

== History ==
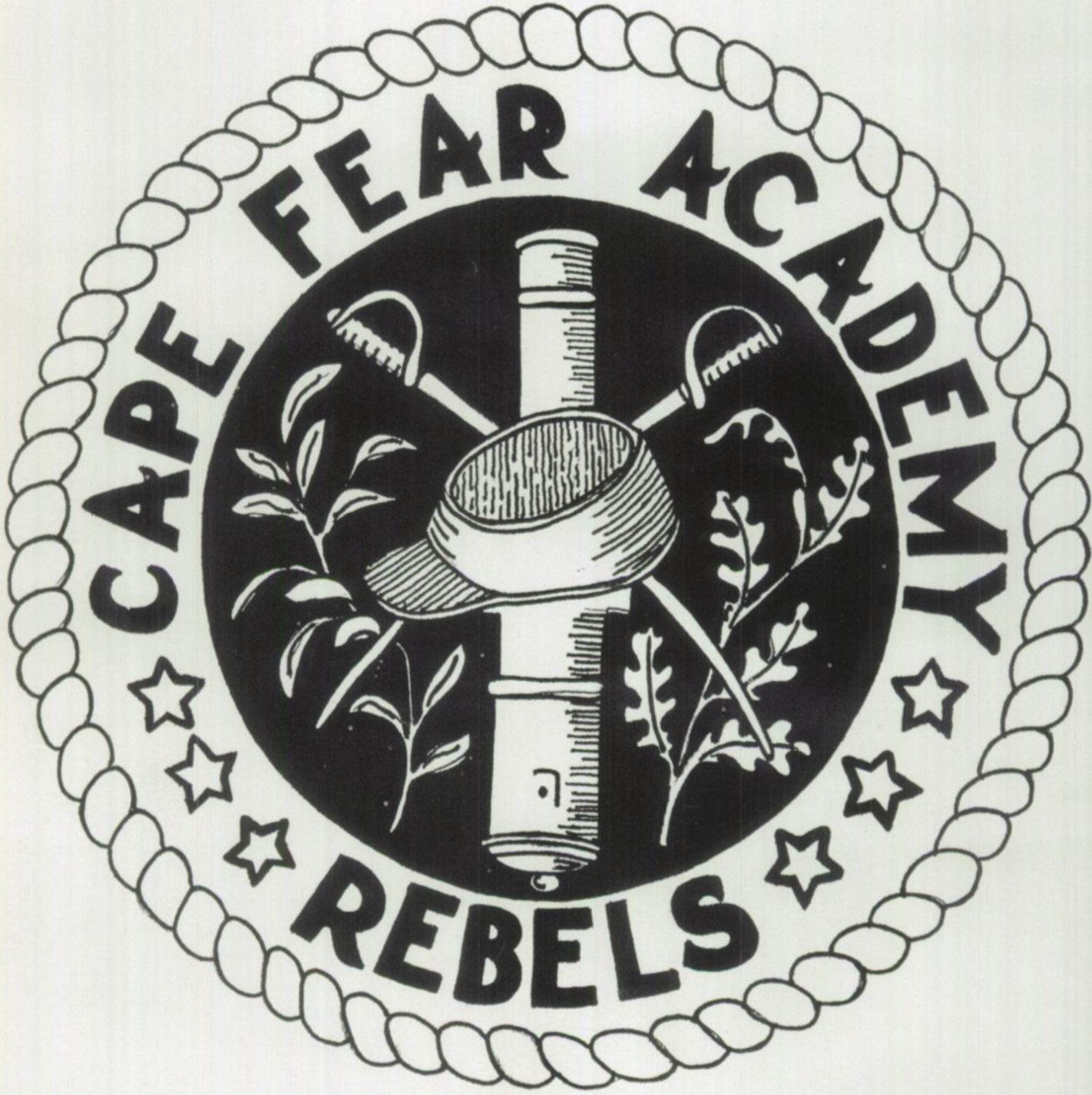
Until 2005, Cape Fear Academy's sports teams were known as The Rebels

The school was founded as a segregation academy in response to the court ordered integration of public schools. In 1967 civil rights activist Lee Shelton claimed that the Ku Klux Klan was raising funds to establish Cape Fear Academy as a private school for white students.

Overt racial discrimination by the school administration eventually faded. The first black student to graduate was in 1984. One other black student had attended, but had left the school without graduating after experiencing bullying and racism.

In 2005, the student body voted to change the school's athletics team name from The Rebels to The Hurricanes.

In 2021, Cape Fear Academy was sued by a student who alleged that CFA expelled her after she protested the school's failure to take action after she was sexually assaulted and then harassed by three male students, in violation of Title IX. The school argued that, since it never accepted federal funding, it was not subject to any federal non-discrimination laws. In June 2022, Judge James C. Dever ruled that since CFA had recently begun to accept loans from the federal Paycheck Protection Program, the school was obliged to comply with federal civil rights laws.

The lawsuit led to renewed media attention concerning Cape Fear Academy's history of racial and gender discrimination. It was alleged that racial and gender-based discrimination and harassment remained prevalent at the school.

In 2023, the school announced an anonymous donor had established a $5 million scholarship fund for students of color.

== Facilities ==
There are four Pre-kindergarten class (ages 3.5 to 5), along with Kindergarten through Grade 5, Middle School (grades 6–8) and Upper School classes (grades 9–12).

The school is situated on a 47-acre (19 ha) campus. Facilities include two classroom buildings, a gymnasium with six classrooms, the Beane Wright Student Center, science laboratories, and multiple athletic fields, including a tennis facility.

In 2022, the school purchased an 11-acre (4.5 ha) plot of land originally owned by Trinity United Methodist Church.

== Accreditation ==
Cape Fear Academy is accredited by the Southern Association of Colleges and Schools and also by the Southern Association of Independent Schools. The school is also an active member of the National Association of Independent Schools, the Southern Association of Independent Schools, the North Carolina Association of Independent Schools, the Educational Records Bureau, the Independent School Management Consortium, and the College Entrance Examination Board. Cape Fear Academy offers affordability plans for tuition; a majority of the awards go to students in the Middle and Upper School.

== Student activities ==
Starting in sixth grade, students can play sports; 80% of students in the Upper School participate in at least one sport. Some notable athletics activities in the school are soccer, volleyball, tennis, basketball, and lacrosse. The school houses many clubs like Beta Club, National History Day, YMCA's Youth and Government, and National Honor Society. The school also has a theater program that produces many different genres of plays from Musicals to Dramas. Along with the stage on the campus, the school is the only school high school allowed to perform at Thalian Hall in Wilmington. The Upper School has a student-government association with a branch called the Honor Council that deals with and makes recommendations for disciplinary infractions. Students starting in ninth grade are also required to get four "engagement units" per semester. These can range from attending a religious ceremony outside of one's faith, participating in a community service project, attending a city council meeting, etc.

== Notable alumni ==
- Patrick Ballantine, state senator and minority leader of the North Carolina Senate
- Maddie Hasson, actress on ABC Family's Twisted
- Reginald Shuford, ACLU attorney and first black student to graduate from CFA

== See also ==
- New Hanover High School
- John T. Hoggard High School
- Emsley A. Laney High School
- New Hanover County Schools
