= 1984 Toronto Blue Jays season =

1984 Toronto Blue Jays
- League: American League
- Division: East
- Ballpark: Exhibition Stadium
- City: Toronto
- Record: 89–73 (.549)
- Divisional place: 2nd
- Owners: Labatt Breweries, Imperial Trust, Canadian Imperial Bank of Commerce
- General managers: Pat Gillick
- Managers: Bobby Cox
- Television: CFTO-TV (Don Chevrier, Tony Kubek, Fergie Olver)
- Radio: CJCL (AM) (Jerry Howarth, Tom Cheek)

The 1984 Toronto Blue Jays season was the franchise's eighth season of Major League Baseball. It resulted in the Blue Jays finishing second in the American League East with a record of 89 wins and 73 losses.

== Offseason ==
=== Transactions ===
Transactions by the Toronto Blue Jays during the off-season before the 1984 season.

==== November 1983 ====
November 7	Randy Moffitt granted free agency.
November 14	Signed amateur free agent Sil Campusano to a contract.

==== December 1983 ====
December 5	Drafted Kelly Gruber from the Cleveland Indians in the 1983 MLB Rule 5 draft. Dave Geisel drafted by the Seattle Mariners in the 1983 MLB Rule 5 draft.
December 6	Drafted José Segura from the Philadelphia Phillies in the 1983 Minor League Draft.
December 8	Acquired Bryan Clark from the Seattle Mariners for Barry Bonnell.
December 20	Acquired Willie Aikens from the Kansas City Royals for Jorge Orta.

==== January 1984 ====
January 10	Signed free agent Dennis Lamp from the Chicago White Sox to a five-year contract.

==== March 1984 ====
March 13	Acquired Derwin McNealy from the New York Yankees for Don Cooper.

==== April 1984 ====
April 3	Signed free agent Manny Castillo from the Seattle Mariners to a contract. Signed free agent Rick Leach from the Detroit Tigers to a contract.

== Regular season ==
- August 19, 1984: In a game against the Oakland Athletics, Cliff Johnson hit the 19th pinch home run of his career, breaking Jerry Lynch's record of 18.
- Jimmy Key set a team record for rookie pitchers by appearing in 63 games.
- Lloyd Moseby and Dave Collins each led the American League with 15 triples.
- Rance Mulliniks sets a team record by getting 8 consecutive hits.
- Dave Stieb finished second in the American League in strikeouts and ERA.

=== Opening Day starters ===
- Jim Clancy
- Jesse Barfield
- George Bell
- Dámaso García
- Alfredo Griffin
- Cliff Johnson
- Lloyd Moseby
- Rance Mulliniks
- Willie Upshaw
- Ernie Whitt

=== Season standings ===
AL East
Team	W	L	Pct.	GB	Home	Road
Detroit Tigers	104	58	.642	—	53‍–‍29	51‍–‍29
Toronto Blue Jays	89	73	.549	15	49‍–‍32	40‍–‍41
New York Yankees	87	75	.537	17	51‍–‍30	36‍–‍45
Boston Red Sox	86	76	.531	18	41‍–‍40	45‍–‍36
Baltimore Orioles	85	77	.525	19	44‍–‍37	41‍–‍40
Cleveland Indians	75	87	.463	29	41‍–‍39	34‍–‍48
Milwaukee Brewers	67	94	.416	36½	38‍–‍43	29‍–‍51

=== Record vs. opponents ===
1984 American League record Sources:
Team	BAL	BOS	CAL	CWS	CLE	DET	KC	MIL	MIN	NYY	OAK	SEA	TEX	TOR
Baltimore	—	6–7	8–4	7–5	7–6	7–6	5–7	7–6	5–7	5–8	6–6	9–3	9–3	4–9
Boston	7–6	—	9–3	7–5	10–3	7–6	3–9	9–4	6–6	7–6	7–5	4–8	5–7	5–8
California	4–8	3–9	—	8–5	8–4	4–8	6–7	8–4	4–9	8–4	7–6	9–4	5–8	7–5
Chicago	5–7	5–7	5–8	—	8–4	4–8	5–8	7–5	8–5	7–5	6–7	5–8	5–8	4–8
Cleveland	6–7	3–10	4–8	4–8	—	4–9	6–6	9–4	7–5	2–11	7–5	8–4	9–3	6–7–1
Detroit	6–7	6–7	8–4	8–4	9–4	—	7–5	11–2	9–3	7–6	9–3	6–6	10–2	8–5
Kansas City	7–5	9–3	7–6	8–5	6–6	5–7	—	6–6	6–7	5–7	5–8	9–4	6–7	5–7
Milwaukee	6–7	4–9	4–8	5–7	4–9	2–11	6–6	—	5–7	6–7	4–8	6–6	5–6	10–3
Minnesota	7–5	6–6	9–4	5–8	5–7	3–9	7–6	7–5	—	8–4	8–5	7–6	8–5	1–11
New York	8–5	6–7	4–8	5–7	11–2	6–7	7–5	7–6	4–8	—	8–4	7–5	6–6	8–5
Oakland	6–6	5–7	6–7	7–6	5–7	3–9	8–5	8–4	5–8	4–8	—	8–5	8–5	4–8
Seattle	3–9	8–4	4–9	8–5	4–8	6–6	4–9	6–6	6–7	5–7	5–8	—	10–3	5–7
Texas	3–9	7–5	8–5	8–5	3–9	2–10	7–6	6–5	5–8	6–6	5–8	3–10	—	6–6
Toronto	9–4	8–5	5–7	8–4	7–6–1	5–8	7–5	3–10	11–1	5–8	8–4	7–5	6–6	—

=== Transactions ===
Transactions for the Toronto Blue Jays during the 1984 regular season.

==== May 1984 ====
May 1	Signed free agent Mike Proly from the Chicago Cubs to a contract.
May 8	Player rights of Geno Petralli sold to the Cleveland Indians.
May 13	Released Joey McLaughlin.
May 16	Signed amateur free agent Rob Ducey to a contract.

==== June 1984 ====
June 8	Purchased the contract of Ron Musselman from the Texas Rangers.
June 25	Signed free agent Don Gordon from the Detroit Tigers to a contract.

==== August 1984 ====
August 23	Signed amateur free agent Domingo Martínez to a contract.

==== September 1984 ====
September 4	Released Alvis Woods.
September 26	Signed amateur free agent Vince Horsman.

=== Roster ===
1984 Toronto Blue Jays
Roster
Pitchers: 31 Jim Acker; 33 Doyle Alexander; 18 Jim Clancy; 35 Bryan Clark; 38 Jim Gott; 25 Roy Lee Jackson; 27 Jimmy Key; 53 Dennis Lamp; 48 Luis Leal; 50 Joey McLaughlin; 30 Ron Musselman; 37 Dave Stieb	Catchers: 54 Toby Hernández; 13 Buck Martinez; 14 Geno Petralli; 12 Ernie Whitt; Infielders: 1 Tony Fernández; 7 Dámaso García; 4 Alfredo Griffin; 17 Kelly Gruber; 16 Garth Iorg; 2 Fred Manrique; 5 Rance Mulliniks; 26 Willie Upshaw	Outfielders: 29 Jesse Barfield; 11 George Bell; 10 Dave Collins; 9 Rick Leach; 15 Lloyd Moseby; 21 Ron Shepherd; 23 Mitch Webster; Other batters: 24 Willie Aikens; 44 Cliff Johnson	Manager: 6 Bobby Cox; Coaches: 43 Cito Gaston; 42 Billy Smith; 8 John Sullivan; 41 Al Widmar; 3 Jimy Williams

=== Game log ===
1984 Game Log
April: 13–9 (Home: 5–5, Away: 8–4)

#	Date	Opponent	Score	Win	Loss	Save	Attendance	Record
1	April 4	@ Mariners	2–3 (10)	Stanton (1–0)	Lamp (0–1)		43,200	0–1
2	April 5	@ Mariners	13–5	Leal (1–0)	Beattie (0–1)		5,399	1–1
3	April 6	@ Angels	11–5	Key (1–0)	Brown (0–1)		24,431	2–1
4	April 7	@ Angels	3–1	Stieb (1–0)	Forsch (1–1)	Lamp (1)	41,859	3–1
5	April 8	@ Angels	3–4	Sánchez (1–1)	Jackson (0–1)		24,095	3–2
6	April 9	@ Athletics	3–4	Caudill (1–0)	Lamp (0–2)		9,868	3–3
7	April 10	@ Athletics	3–0	Leal (2–0)	Sorensen (1–1)	Jackson (1)	7,226	4–3
8	April 13	@ Rangers	3–2	Lamp (1–2)	Tobik (1–2)	Key (1)	10,515	5–3
9	April 14	@ Rangers	2–6	Hough (1–1)	Clancy (0–1)		9,852	5–4
10	April 15	@ Rangers	2–1	Lamp (2–2)	Stewart (0–3)		12,583	6–4
11	April 17	Orioles	3–2	Key (2–0)	Martinez (0–1)	Lamp (2)	35,602	7–4
12	April 18	Orioles	7–1	Stieb (2–0)	Palmer (0–2)		13,489	8–4
13	April 19	Orioles	2–1	Clancy (1–1)	McGregor (1–3)		14,323	9–4
14	April 20	Angels	6–10 (13)	Sánchez (2–1)	Acker (0–1)		37,241	9–5
15	April 21	Angels	4–8	Romanick (2–1)	Gott (0–1)		44,164	9–6
16	April 22	Angels	6–9	Slaton (1–0)	Key (2–1)	Kaufman (1)	16,462	9–7
17	April 23	Mariners	8–5	Stieb (3–0)	Langston (1–1)	Jackson (2)	13,330	10–7
18	April 24	Mariners	2–4	Beard (1–0)	Clancy (1–2)		12,398	10–8
19	April 25	Athletics	11–0	Leal (3–0)	Conroy (0–2)		15,434	11–8
20	April 26	Athletics	4–7	Warren (3–2)	Gott (0–2)	Burgmeier (2)	16,488	11–9
21	April 27	@ Royals	1–0	Alexander (1–0)	Gubicza (0–2)	Lamp (3)	16,435	12–9
22	April 28	@ Royals	6–0	Stieb (4–0)	Saberhagen (1–1)		18,194	13–9
--	April 29	@ Royals	Postponed (rain) Rescheduled for July 23					
--	April 30	Rangers	Postponed (wind) Rescheduled for May 1					

May: 19–6 (Home: 15–2; Away: 4–4)

#	Date	Opponent	Score	Win	Loss	Save	Attendance	Record
23	May 1	Rangers	10–4	Leal (4–0)	Tanana (2–3)	Lamp (4)		14–9
24	May 1	Rangers	1–4	Darwin (3–0)	Alexander (1–1)		13,159	14–10
25	May 2	Rangers	7–6	Clancy (2–2)	Hough (1–4)	Lamp (5)	13,274	15–10
26	May 4	Royals	4–3 (10)	Stieb (5–0)	Huismann (0–2)		16,469	16–10
27	May 5	Royals	10–1	Gott (1–2)	Jackson (0–3)		31,076	17–10
28	May 6	Royals	2–1	Jackson (1–1)	Gura (4–1)		23,334	18–10
--	May 7	@ Orioles	Postponed (wet grounds) Rescheduled for May 10					
--	May 8	@ Orioles	Postponed (rain) Rescheduled for May 9					
29	May 9	@ Orioles	4–7	McGregor (4–3)	Clancy (2–3)			18–11
30	May 9	@ Orioles	3–7	Martinez (1–3)	Key (2–2)		18,731	18–12
31	May 10	@ Orioles	4–3 (10)	Jackson (2–1)	Martínez (1–1)		11,214	19–12
--	May 11	@ Indians	Postponed (rain) Rescheduled for May 13					
32	May 12	@ Indians	4–8	Blyleven (4–2)	Acker (0–2)	Camacho (4)	11,066	19–13
33	May 13	@ Indians	4–4 (8)	Postponed (rain) Rescheduled for August 14			5,630	19–13
--	May 13	@ Indians	Postponed (rain) Rescheduled for August 15					
34	May 15	@ Twins	5–2 (10)	Jackson (3–1)	Davis (2–3)		26,761	20–13
35	May 16	@ Twins	8–7	Alexander (2–1)	Filson (3–1)	Acker (1)	51,863	21–13
36	May 17	White Sox	3–2	Jackson (4–1)	Hoyt (3–5)	Lamp (6)	18,328	22–13
37	May 18	White Sox	4–3	Clancy (3–3)	Burns (2–2)	Key (2)	19,507	23–13
38	May 19	White Sox	1–0	Gott (2–2)	Seaver (4–3)	Lamp (7)	28,382	24–13
39	May 20	White Sox	0–3	Dotson (6–2)	Stieb (5–1)		26,347	24–14
40	May 21	Twins	3–2	Alexander (3–1)	Davis (2–4)		43,347	25–14
41	May 22	Twins	3–2	Jackson (5–1)	Smithson (6–4)		17,287	26–14
42	May 23	Twins	4–1	Clancy (4–3)	Viola (4–5)	Lamp (8)	17,189	27–14
43	May 25	Indians	5–1	Stieb (6–1)	Heaton (2–4)		18,195	28–14
44	May 26	Indians	2–1	Alexander (4–1)	Farr (0–3)	Key (3)	22,283	29–14
45	May 27	Indians	6–1	Leal (5–0)	Sutcliffe (3–4)			30–14
46	May 27	Indians	6–5	Jackson (6–1)	Camacho (1–4)		37,097	31–14
--	May 28	@ White Sox	Postponed (rain) Rescheduled for August 30					
47	May 29	@ White Sox	1–8	Hoyt (4–5)	Clancy (4–4)		19,603	31–15
48	May 30	@ White Sox	2–1	Stieb (7–1)	Burns (2–4)	Key (4)	23,490	32–15

June: 13–16 (Home: 9–5; Away: 4–11)

#	Date	Opponent	Score	Win	Loss	Save	Attendance	Record
49	June 1	Yankees	10–2	Alexander (5–1)	Fontenot (1–5)		30,586	33–15
50	June 2	Yankees	9–8 (10)	Lamp (3–2)	Christiansen (1–2)		42,269	34–15
51	June 3	Yankees	2–15	Niekro (8–3)	Clancy (4–5)		33,077	34–16
52	June 4	@ Tigers	3–6 (10)	López (5–0)	Key (2–3)		26,733	34–17
53	June 5	@ Tigers	8–4	Acker (1–2)	Abbott (2–2)		35,983	35–17
54	June 6	@ Tigers	6–3	Leal (6–0)	Petry (8–3)		38,167	36–17
55	June 7	@ Tigers	3–5	Morris (11–2)	Clancy (4–6)		40,879	36–18
56	June 8	@ Yankees	3–4 (11)	Righetti (2–0)	Acker (1–3)		20,252	36–19
57	June 9	@ Yankees	1–2	Guidry (5–4)	Stieb (7–2)		20,661	36–20
58	June 10	@ Yankees	3–5	Christiansen (2–2)	Alexander (5–2)	Righetti (7)	41,018	36–21
59	June 11	Tigers	4–5	Rozema (2–0)	Leal (6–1)	Hernández (10)	35,062	36–22
60	June 12	Tigers	12–3	Clancy (5–6)	Morris (11–3)		40,437	37–22
61	June 13	Tigers	7–3	Stieb (8–2)	Wilcox (7–4)		34,122	38–22
62	June 15	Red Sox	4–3 (11)	Lamp (4–2)	Clear (5–1)		30,065	39–22
63	June 16	Red Sox	7–0	Leal (7–1)	Hurst (8–5)		31,278	40–22
64	June 17	Red Sox	5–3	Clancy (6–6)	Gale (1–1)	Jackson (3)	28,396	41–22
65	June 19	Brewers	5–6	Fingers (1–2)	Key (2–4)		32,210	41–23
66	June 20	Brewers	4–5	Tellmann (2–1)	Alexander (5–3)		31,282	41–24
67	June 21	@ Red Sox	5–2	Leal (8–1)	Nipper (0–2)		18,372	42–24
68	June 22	@ Red Sox	1–8	Clemens (3–1)	Clancy (6–7)		23,167	42–25
69	June 23	@ Red Sox	9–3	Gott (3–2)	Gale (1–2)		27,689	43–25
70	June 24	@ Red Sox	3–5 (10)	Stanley (2–6)	Lamp (4–3)		32,521	43–26
71	June 25	@ Brewers	1–2	Cocanower (6–6)	Alexander (5–4)	Fingers (13)		43–27
72	June 25	@ Brewers	4–9	McClure (2–3)	Acker (1–4)		15,088	43–28
73	June 26	@ Brewers	3–6	Sutton (5–7)	Leal (8–2)	Fingers (14)	19,068	43–29
74	June 27	@ Brewers	1–5	Porter (6–3)	Clancy (6–8)	Tellmann (1)	31,141	43–30
75	June 28	Athletics	9–6	Gott (4–2)	Atherton (5–4)		30,213	44–30
76	June 29	Athletics	1–2	Burris (7–3)	Stieb (8–3)	Caudill (16)	25,280	44–31
77	June 30	Athletics	6–1	Alexander (6–4)	Krueger (5–4)		36,176	45–31

July: 14–14 (Home: 7–6; Away: 7–8)

#	Date	Opponent	Score	Win	Loss	Save	Attendance	Record
78	July 1	Athletics	7–6	Acker (2–4)	Atherton (5–5)	Jackson (4)	35,046	46–31
79	July 2	Angels	3–6	Witt (8–7)	Clancy (6–9)	Aase (1)	29,227	46–32
80	July 3	Angels	4–0	Gott (5–2)	John (4–7)		26,255	47–32
81	July 4	Angels	6–3	Stieb (9–3)	Romanick (8–9)		24,330	48–32
82	July 5	Mariners	10–8	Alexander (7–4)	Beattie (8–8)	Jackson (5)	22,353	49–32
83	July 6	Mariners	9–2	Leal (9–2)	Langston (6–7)		22,385	50–32
84	July 7	Mariners	4–8	Moore (4–6)	Clancy (6–10)	Stanton (5)	33,475	50–33
85	July 8	Mariners	1–7	Beattie (9–8)	Gott (5–3)	Vande Berg (4)	30,070	50–34
86	July 12	@ Athletics	4–7	Krueger (6–5)	Lamp (4–4)	Caudill (19)	16,066	50–35
87	July 13	@ Athletics	6–3	Leal (10–2)	Burris (8–4)	Jackson (6)	17,172	51–35
88	July 14	@ Athletics	2–1	Stieb (10–3)	Caudill (8–2)		22,048	52–35
89	July 15	@ Athletics	6–3	Clancy (7–10)	Young (2–1)	Jackson (7)	24,044	53–35
90	July 16	@ Angels	0–3	Slaton (3–3)	Gott (5–4)		24,890	53–36
91	July 17	@ Angels	3–5	Witt (10–7)	Acker (2–5)	Aase (2)	27,176	53–37
92	July 18	@ Angels	8–2	Leal (11–2)	Zahn (9–7)		28,634	54–37
93	July 19	@ Mariners	8–1	Stieb (11–3)	Vande Berg (6–9)		7,489	55–37
94	July 20	@ Mariners	12–7	Acker (3–5)	Mirabella (1–4)		8,246	56–37
95	July 21	@ Mariners	3–9	Barojas (5–3)	Lamp (4–5)		14,516	56–38
96	July 22	@ Mariners	5–3	Alexander (8–4)	Langston (8–8)	Jackson (8)	7,263	57–38
97	July 23	@ Royals	8–9	Beckwith (3–2)	Jackson (6–2)	Quisenberry (26)		57–39
98	July 23	@ Royals	2–7	Wills (1–1)	Gott (5–5)	Saberhagen (1)	31,852	57–40
99	July 24	@ Royals	4–5	Gubicza (7–8)	Stieb (11–4)	Quisenberry (27)	21,607	57–41
100	July 25	@ Royals	4–5 (13)	Quisenberry (4–2)	Clark (0–1)		19,653	57–42
101	July 27	Rangers	2–4	Hough (11–8)	Alexander (8–5)		26,269	57–43
102	July 28	Rangers	4–5	Mason (7–9)	Jackson (6–3)	Schmidt (6)	28,330	57–44
103	July 29	Rangers	6–2	Stieb (12–4)	Darwin (6–6)		30,143	58–44
104	July 30	Royals	4–7	Leibrandt (5–4)	Clancy (7–11)		24,414	58–45
105	July 31	Royals	6–5	Alexander (9–5)	Wills (1–2)	Gott (1)	23,156	59–45

August: 18–8 (Home: 6–1; Away: 12–7)

#	Date	Opponent	Score	Win	Loss	Save	Attendance	Record
106	August 1	Royals	4–1	Leal (12–2)	Gura (11–8)	Gott (2)	22,084	60–45
107	August 3	@ Orioles	5–2	Jackson (7–3)	McGregor (12–10)		37,219	61–45
108	August 4	@ Orioles	6–2	Clancy (8–11)	Flanagan (9–11)		37,685	62–45
109	August 5	@ Orioles	4–3	Key (3–4)	Martinez (4–8)	Lamp (9)	34,016	63–45
110	August 6	@ Rangers	4–5	Mason (8–9)	Jackson (7–4)		11,540	63–46
111	August 7	@ Rangers	6–7 (10)	Schmidt (5–4)	Lamp (4–6)		10,313	63–47
112	August 8	@ Rangers	7–2	Clancy (9–11)	Darwin (6–7)		9,696	64–47
113	August 10	Orioles	2–0	Alexander (10–5)	Martínez (4–6)		34,107	65–47
114	August 11	Orioles	3–2	Gott (6–5)	Davis (12–5)		41,426	66–47
115	August 12	Orioles	4–5	McGregor (13–11)	Jackson (7–5)	Martinez (16)	36,363	66–48
116	August 13	Orioles	1–2	Boddicker (14–8)	Clancy (9–12)		33,238	66–49
117	August 14	@ Indians	8–1	Alexander (11–5)	Heaton (8–13)			67–49
118	August 14	@ Indians	9–5	Lamp (5–6)	Waddell (2–4)		6,158	68–49
119	August 15	@ Indians	1–16	Schulze (2–4)	Leal (12–3)			68–50
120	August 15	@ Indians	3–4 (13)	Jeffcoat (4–1)	Key (3–5)		6,101	68–51
121	August 16	@ Indians	5–6	Waddell (3–4)	Lamp (5–7)		5,598	68–52
122	August 17	@ White Sox	4–3	Clancy (10–12)	Hoyt (10–13)		29,941	69–52
123	August 18	@ White Sox	6–7	Roberge (3–0)	Jackson (7–6)	Agosto (7)	34,484	69–53
124	August 19	@ White Sox	7–4	Key (4–5)	Agosto (2–1)		38,839	70–53
125	August 21	Indians	1–3	Smith (5–4)	Stieb (12–5)	Camacho (17)	25,253	70–54
126	August 22	Indians	3–13	Blyleven (14–5)	Clancy (10–13)		22,393	70–55
127	August 23	Indians	6–1	Alexander (12–5)	Schulze (2–5)		23,407	71–55
128	August 24	@ Twins	6–2	Leal (13–3)	Lysander (3–2)	Key (5)	26,602	72–55
129	August 25	@ Twins	4–5 (12)	Castillo (2–0)	Gott (6–6)		23,236	72–56
130	August 26	@ Twins	2–1	Stieb (13–5)	Schrom (4–7)		24,654	73–56
131	August 27	@ Twins	5–2	Lamp (6–7)	Smithson (13–10)	Key (6)	19,251	74–56
132	August 28	White Sox	7–6 (11)	Clark (1–1)	Reed (0–5)		25,327	75–56
133	August 29	White Sox	5–8	Bannister (12–8)	Leal (13–4)	Spillner (2)	25,232	75–57
134	August 30	@ White Sox	4–3	Gott (7–6)	Seaver (12–9)	Key (7)	22,800	76–57
135	August 31	Twins	7–0	Stieb (14–5)	Castillo (2–1)		26,309	77–57

September: 12–16 (Home: 7–9; Away: 5–7)

#	Date	Opponent	Score	Win	Loss	Save	Attendance	Record
136	September 1	Twins	12–4	Lamp (7–7)	Smithson (13–11)	Jackson (9)	26,526	78–57
137	September 2	Twins	6–0	Alexander (13–5)	Viola (14–12)		31,000	79–57
138	September 3	@ Yankees	0–2	Cowley (6–1)	Leal (13–5)	Righetti (24)	26,835	79–58
139	September 4	@ Yankees	6–4	Clancy (11–13)	Armstrong (3–2)	Key (8)	15,867	80–58
140	September 5	@ Yankees	3–4 (10)	Righetti (5–5)	Jackson (7–7)		17,383	80–59
141	September 7	Tigers	4–7 (10)	Hernández (9–2)	Musselman (0–1)		37,420	80–60
142	September 8	Tigers	4–10	Scherrer (1–0)	Leal (13–6)	López (13)	41,059	80–61
143	September 9	Tigers	2–7	Wilcox (16–7)	Clancy (11–14)		37,392	80–62
144	September 10	Yankees	2–6	Montefusco (3–2)	Stieb (14–6)	Howell (7)	21,176	80–63
145	September 11	Yankees	10–3	Lamp (8–7)	Rasmussen (8–5)	Jackson (10)	21,451	81–63
146	September 12	Yankees	2–1	Alexander (14–5)	Niekro (16–8)		20,426	82–63
147	September 13	Yankees	1–6	Fontenot (7–8)	Leal (13–7)		20,681	82–64
148	September 14	@ Tigers	7–2	Clancy (12–14)	Morris (17–11)	Key (9)	46,040	83–64
149	September 15	@ Tigers	1–2	Wilcox (17–7)	Stieb (14–7)	Hernández (29)	44,349	83–65
150	September 16	@ Tigers	3–8	Berenguer (9–10)	Clark (1–2)		45,488	83–66
151	September 17	Red Sox	5–4	Alexander (15–5)	Ojeda (11–12)		18,480	84–66
152	September 18	Red Sox	3–10	Gale (2–3)	Leal (13–8)		18,399	84–67
153	September 19	Red Sox	4–10	Hurst (12–10)	Clancy (12–15)	Clear (8)	23,212	84–68
154	September 20	Brewers	6–4	Stieb (15–7)	Gibson (1–4)	Key (10)	21,688	85–68
155	September 21	Brewers	1–5	Sutton (14–12)	Lamp (8–8)		21,147	85–69
156	September 22	Brewers	2–1	Alexander (16–5)	Haas (9–11)		26,152	86–69
157	September 23	Brewers	5–8	Kern (1–0)	Jackson (7–8)	Searage (6)	28,550	86–70
158	September 24	@ Red Sox	9–8	Clancy (13–15)	Hurst (12–11)	Musselman (1)	13,328	87–70
159	September 25	@ Red Sox	6–14	Nipper (11–6)	Stieb (15–8)		14,259	87–71
160	September 26	@ Red Sox	8–4	Alexander (17–5)	Boyd (12–11)		13,065	88–71
161	September 28	@ Brewers	3–4 (11)	Searage (2–1)	Musselman (0–2)		17,026	88–72
162	September 29	@ Brewers	5–4	Stieb (16–8)	Cocanower (8–16)		9,736	89–72
163	September 30	@ Brewers	0–4	Gibson (2–5)	Alexander (17–6)		10,277	89–73

== Player stats ==
=== Batting ===
==== Starters by position ====
Note: Pos = Position; G = Games played; AB = At bats; R = Runs scored; H = Hits; 2B = Doubles; 3B = Triples; Avg. = Batting average; HR = Home runs; RBI = Runs batted in; SB = Stolen bases

Pos	Player	G	AB	R	H	2B	3B	Avg.	HR	RBI	SB
C	Ernie Whitt	124	315	35	75	12	1	.238	15	46	0
1B	Willie Upshaw	152	569	79	158	31	9	.278	19	84	10
2B	Dámaso García	152	633	79	180	32	5	.284	5	46	46
3B	Rance Mulliniks	125	343	41	111	21	5	.324	3	42	2
SS	Alfredo Griffin	140	419	53	101	8	2	.241	4	30	11
LF	Dave Collins	128	441	59	136	24	15	.308	2	44	60
CF	Lloyd Moseby	158	592	97	166	28	15	.280	18	92	39
RF	George Bell	159	606	85	177	39	4	.292	26	87	11
DH	Cliff Johnson	127	359	51	109	23	1	.304	16	61	0

==== Other batters ====
Note: G = Games played; AB = At bats; R = Runs scored; H = Hits; 2B = Doubles; 3B = Triples; Avg. = Batting average; HR = Home runs; RBI = Runs batted in; SB = Stolen bases

Player	G	AB	R	H	2B	3B	Avg.	HR	RBI	SB
Jesse Barfield	110	320	51	91	14	1	.284	14	49	8
Garth Iorg	121	247	24	56	10	3	.227	1	25	1
Willie Aikens	93	234	21	48	7	0	.205	11	26	0
Tony Fernández	88	233	29	63	5	3	.270	3	19	5
Buck Martinez	102	232	24	51	13	1	.220	5	37	0
Rick Leach	65	88	11	23	6	2	.261	0	7	0
Mitch Webster	26	22	9	5	2	1	.227	0	4	0
Kelly Gruber	15	16	1	1	0	0	.063	1	2	0
Fred Manrique	10	9	0	3	0	0	.333	0	1	0
Ron Shepherd	12	4	0	0	0	0	.000	0	0	0
Geno Petralli	3	3	0	0	0	0	.000	0	0	0
Toby Hernández	3	2	1	1	0	0	.500	0	0	0

=== Pitching ===
==== Starting pitchers ====
Note: G = Games pitched; GS = Games started; IP = Innings pitched; W = Wins; L = Losses; ERA = Earned run average; R = Runs allowed; ER = Earned runs allowed; BB = Walks allowed; K = Strikeouts

Player	G	GS	IP	W	L	ERA	R	ER	BB	K
Dave Stieb	35	35	267.0	16	8	2.83	87	84	88	198
Doyle Alexander	36	35	261.2	17	6	3.13	99	91	59	139
Luis Leal	35	35	222.1	13	8	3.89	106	96	77	134
Jim Clancy	36	36	219.2	13	15	5.12	132	125	88	118

==== Other pitchers ====
Note: G = Games pitched; GS = Games started; IP = Innings pitched; W = Wins; L = Losses; SV = Saves; ERA = Earned run average; R = Runs allowed; ER = Earned runs allowed; BB = Walks allowed; K = Strikeouts

Player	G	GS	IP	W	L	SV	ERA	R	ER	BB	K
Jim Gott	35	12	109.2	7	6	2	4.02	54	49	49	73
Bryan Clark	20	3	45.2	1	2	0	5.91	33	30	22	21

==== Relief pitchers ====
Note: G = Games pitched; IP = Innings pitched; W = Wins; L = Losses; SV = Saves; ERA = Earned run average; R = Runs allowed; ER = Earned runs allowed; BB = Walks allowed; K = Strikeouts

Player	G	IP	W	L	SV	ERA	R	ER	BB	K
Jimmy Key	63	62.0	4	5	10	4.65	37	32	32	44
Roy Lee Jackson	54	86.0	7	8	10	3.56	40	34	31	58
Dennis Lamp	56	85.0	8	8	9	4.55	53	43	38	45
Jim Acker	32	72.0	3	5	1	4.38	39	35	25	33
Ron Musselman	11	21.1	0	2	1	2.11	7	5	10	9
Joey McLaughlin	6	10.2	0	0	0	2.53	6	3	7	3
Rick Leach	1	1.0	0	0	0	27.00	3	3	2	0

== Award winners ==
- Doyle Alexander, Pitcher of the Month Award, September
- Dave Collins, American League Leader, Triples, 15
- Lloyd Moseby, American League Leader, Triples, 15

All-Star Game

- Dámaso García, second base
- Alfredo Griffin, shortstop
- Dave Stieb, pitcher

== Farm system ==
Level	Team	League	Manager
AAA	Syracuse Chiefs	International League	Jim Beauchamp
AA	Knoxville Blue Jays	Southern League	John McLaren
A	Kinston Blue Jays	Carolina League	Doug Ault
A	Florence Blue Jays	South Atlantic League	Dennis Holmberg
Rookie	GCL Blue Jays	Gulf Coast League	Ramón Webster
Rookie	Medicine Hat Blue Jays	Pioneer League	Duane Larson
