= Charlie Boney =

American architect (1924–2014)

Charles (Charlie) Hussey Boney (November 16, 1924 in New Hanover, NC – May 16, 2014 Wilmington, North Carolina) was an American architect.

North Carolina has the third highest number of Modernist residences in the country. Modernist design became popular in the U.S. in the 1930s, primarily in California, and expanded east through the 1960s. Charlie Boney was one of the architects who contributed to the state's design heritage during that time by influencing the modernist movements and designing modernist houses for people. Boney contributed by designing modernist houses and influencing the movement with his work.

== Early life ==
=== Education and war ===
Boney grew up in Wilmington and attended New Hanover High School. Following this, he went to North Carolina State University for one year and then served in World War II for four years in the US Army Combat Engineers starting in 1943, where he built bridges in advance of Patton's march towards the Battle of the Bulge and then to Berlin.

After the war, he went back to school and earned a BA in Architecture from North Carolina State University's School of Design.

== Career ==
Boney then went to work with his brothers and father at Leslie N. Boney Architects in Wilmington, North Carolina. Boney started to take control of the firm, and the firm grew to a regional firm from a local firm and became one of the largest in the state under the new name, LS3P.

=== Projects ===
Boney was interested in Health Care Design, he designed many hospitals including the New Hanover Regional Medical Center, Pender Memorial Hospital, Duplin General Hospital, and Cape Fear Memorial Hospital, of which he was chief architect for all of them.

Other projects of his include First Bank Headquarters, Hoggard High School, Laney High School, Brogden Hall, Alderman Elementary School, and UNCW's Kenan Auditorium.

Some other projects of his include:

1952 – The David Wilson House, 1801 Hawthorne Road, Wilmington, NC. 3500 Square Feet

1968 – The Leslie N. Boney, Jr. Residence, his brother's, 2305 Gillette Drive, Wilmington, NC. 5000 Square Feet.

1969 – The Charles H. Boney Residence, his own, 2105 Gillette Drive, Wilmington, NC. 4000 Square Feet.

1975 – The Sigmund Bear Cottage, 94 Beach Road South.

== Boney and the AIA ==
Boney was an advocate for the profession of architecture, he held over a dozen American Institute of Architecture (AIA) positions at the local, state, and national levels. He served as President of AIA of North Carolina in 1974. In 2003, he won AIA of North Carolina's F. Carter Williams Gold Medal for career achievement. In 2014, he was awarded the North Carolina's Order of the Long Leaf Pine. Boney won an AIANC and SARC Design Award in 1955 for the Little Chapel on the Boardwalk in Wrightsville Beach, NC.

== Personal life ==
=== Death ===
Boney died on May 16, 2014, at his home in Wilmington, North Carolina.

=== Family ===
Boney's father, Leslie Norwood Boney was also an architect, and he founded the firm Boney worked at during his career.

His mother was Mary Lily Hussey Boney, and his sister was Sue Boney Ives.

Boney had three daughters, Elizabeth Boney Jenkins, Lynne Boney, and Susan Boney Coleman.
