= Eugene Ashley High School =

American public school in North Carolina

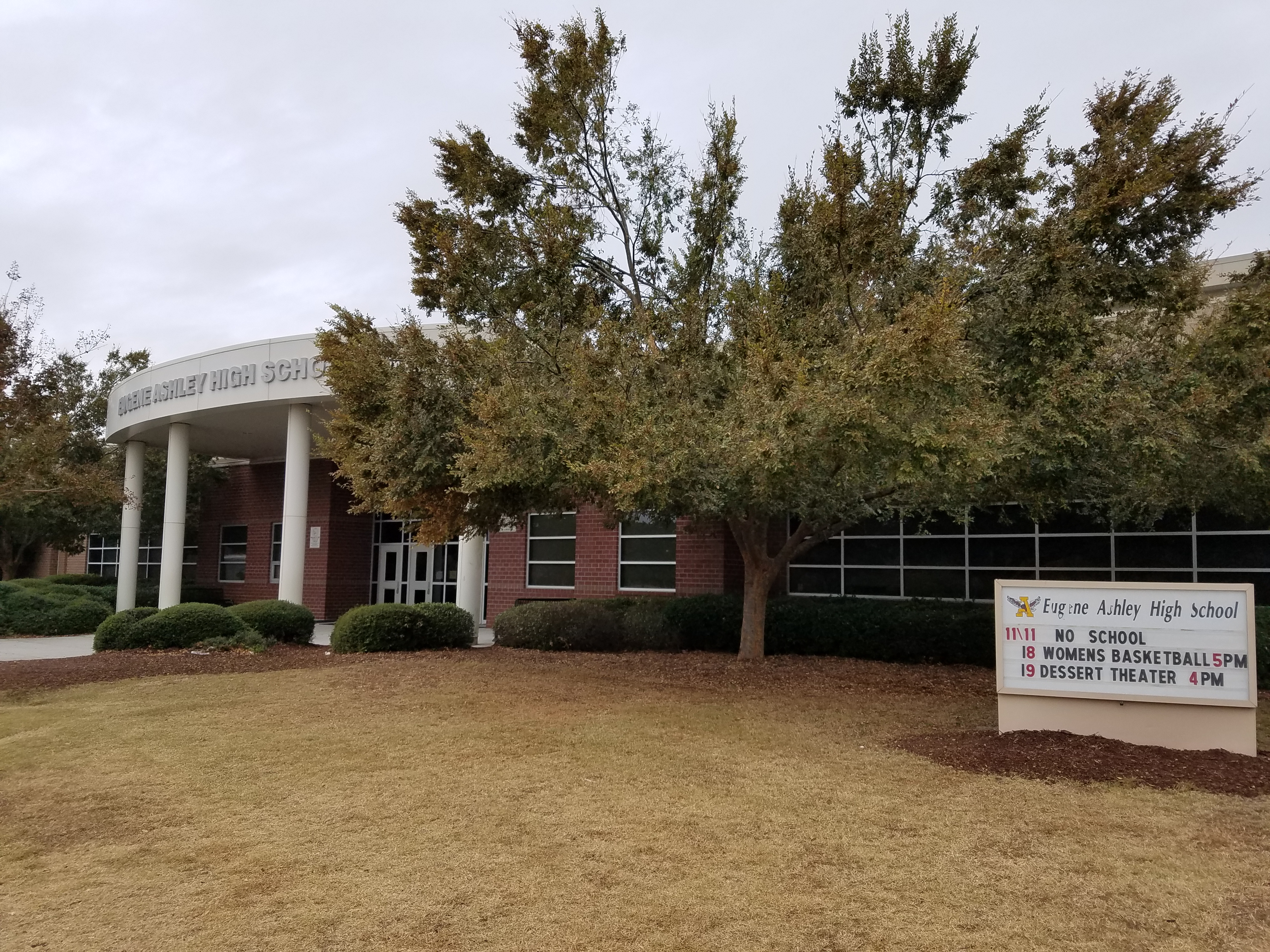
- Eugene Ashley High School, November 2016

Location
- 555 Halyburton Memorial Parkway; Wilmington, North Carolina 28412; United States; 34°05′59″N 77°54′45″W

Information
- Type: Public
- Motto: Achievement - Honor - Service
- Established: 2001 (25 years ago)
- School board: New Hanover County
- School district: New Hanover County School District
- Superintendent: Charles Foust
- CEEB code: 344353
- Principal: Mike Perez
- Staff: 97.58 (FTE)
- Grades: 9-12
- Enrollment: 1,899 (2023–2024)
- Student to teacher ratio: 19.46
- Colors: Garnet and gold
- Athletics: NCHSAA 7A
- Athletics conference: Carolina Coast 6A/7A/8A
- Mascot: Screaming Eagles
- Communities served: Monkey Junction, Silver Lake, Myrtle Grove, Carolina Beach, Kure Beach
- Website: https://ashley.nhcs.net/

Eugene Ashley High School (commonly known as Ashley High School) is a high school just outside Wilmington, North Carolina, located in the New Hanover County School District. The facility was opened in the New Hanover County Veteran's Park in 2001.

== History ==
The school was named after Medal of Honor recipient Sgt. Eugene Ashley Jr. (1930–1968), a native of Wilmington, who died at age 37 in the battle of Lang Vei during the Vietnam War. The school was opened in 2001, along with Murry Middle School that same year. Anderson Elementary School was opened in 2007. Both schools are also named for Medal of Honor recipients. These three schools make up the Veterans Park Complex.

== Basic information ==
- 25% Minority student enrollment
- School Report Card
- Student to computer ratio: 1:1

== Academics ==
Ashley High School is home to the Marine Science Academy which is a partnership with UNCW that allows students to study college level oceanography and biology, and which requires students to participate in internships through UNCW and CFCC. Ashley students are also able to take dual enrollment classes through Cape Fear Community College. In addition, students have a wide range of Advanced Placement classes to choose from. Eugene Ashley High School offers the AP Capstone diploma. AP course offerings include

- AP English Literature and Composition
- AP English Language and Composition
- AP Seminar
- AP Research
- AP Psychology
- AP US Government
- AP Statistics
- AP Calculus AB
- AP Calculus BC
- AP Biology
- AP Chemistry
- AP Environmental Science
- AP World History
- AP US History
- AP Physics
- AP Art and Design
- AP US Government
- AP Precalculus
- AP Computer Science Principles
- AP Spanish Language and Culture
- AP French Language and Culture

== In popular culture ==
The Eugene Ashley High School appears in several One Tree Hill episodes, and the TV movies Teen Spirit, and Red Zone. The film The Marc Pease Experience. The television show Eastbound & Down filmed parts of Season 4, Episode 8 in the gym and outside the school.

== Notable alumni ==
- Alex Highsmith, NFL linebacker
- Trevor Kelley, MLB pitcher
- Saniya Rivers, WNBA guard
