= Penn Biden Center for Diplomacy and Global Engagement =

University of Pennsylvania think tank

- Type: Private
- Active: February 8, 2018–September 2024
- Parent institution: University of Pennsylvania
- Location: 101 Constitution Ave., N.W., Washington, D.C., United States
- Website: global.upenn.edu/penn-biden-center

The Penn Biden Center for Diplomacy and Global Engagement is a center of the University of Pennsylvania, located in Washington, D.C. It was established in 2018 and named after Joe Biden, later the 46th president of the United States. Its website was redirected and the center was effectively renamed Penn Washington in September 2024.

A think tank, the Penn Biden Center is, per its mission statement, "founded on the principle that a democratic, open, secure, tolerant, and interconnected world benefits all Americans." The Penn Center engages foreign policy leaders as well as members of the Penn community on issues which are critical to sustaining the principles of American leadership on the global stage into the 21st century.

== History ==
The Penn Biden Center for Diplomacy and Global Engagement officially opened on February 8, 2018. The center opened offices in Washington, D.C. The inaugural ceremony was attended by Biden, the president of the University of Pennsylvania, Amy Gutmann, and David Cohen, chairman of Penn's board of trustees. It featured a discussion on global affairs between Biden and veteran NBC News journalist and Penn alumna, Andrea Mitchell. Guests also included former U.S. secretary of state John Kerry, former U.S. national security advisor Susan Rice, former U.S. attorneys general Eric Holder and Loretta Lynch and current and former members of Congress. The managing director of the Penn Biden Center is Michael Carpenter. The Penn Biden Center's website was redirected and the center was effectively renamed Penn Washington in September 2024.

=== Biden presidency ===
Following the victory of Joe Biden in the 2020 United States presidential election, the center issued the following statement:

The Penn Biden Center will carry on its mission of conducting original research, analysis, and commentary on America’s place in the world and the global forces that impact our national security, democratic institutions, and foreign policy. As a research unit within the University of Pennsylvania, the Penn Biden Center will remain completely independent of the Biden administration, and the analysis and opinions of its staff and affiliated scholars will reflect their personal views alone, and not necessarily those of the University of Pennsylvania. The Penn Biden Center does not accept any contributions or gifts.

=== Classified documents investigation ===
Between November 2022 and January 2023, President Joe Biden's attorneys found approximately 25 to 30 classified documents in his former office at the Penn Biden Center and in his personal residence in Wilmington, Delaware, dating to his vice presidency in the Obama administration. This was immediately reported by the President's attorneys to the National Archives and Records Administration, which retrieved them. On January 12, Attorney General Merrick Garland appointed a special counsel to investigate possible unauthorized removal and retention of classified documents. The House Judiciary Committee opened a separate investigation.

== Notable individuals ==
=== Managing directors ===
- Antony Blinken, 71st United States Secretary of State
- Steve Ricchetti, Counselor to the President, former Chief of Staff to the Vice President

=== Notable fellows ===
- Colin Kahl, Under Secretary of Defense, former National Security Advisor to the Vice President
- Spencer Boyer, Biden administration national security official
- Jeffrey Prescott, Deputy United States Ambassador to the United Nations

=== Other notable affiliated individuals ===
- Brian McKeon, State Department official
