= Battle of Ban Houei Sane =

Part of the Vietnam War (1968)

- Part of Vietnam War
| Date | 23–24 January 1968 |
| Location | Ban Houei Sane, Laos 16.611°N 106.538°E |
| Result | North Vietnamese victory |

Belligerents
| Kingdom of Laos | North Vietnam |

Commanders and leaders
| (Laos) Soulang Phetsampou | (North Vietnam) Lê Công Phê |

Units involved
| Bataillon Volontaire (BV-33) | 24th Regiment |

Casualties and losses
| Unknown, most survivors escaped to the nearby Lang Vei camp. | 29 killed 54 wounded |

The Battle of Ban Houei Sane took place during the Vietnam War, beginning on the night of 23 January 1968, when the 24th Regiment of the People's Army of Vietnam (PAVN) 304th Division overran the small Royal Lao Army outpost at Ban Houei Sane. The fighting at Ban Houei Sane was one in a series of battles fought between North Vietnamese and Allied forces during the Tet Offensive. The small outpost, defended by the 700 man Bataillon Volontaire (BV-33), was attacked and overwhelmed by the vastly superior PAVN and their PT-76 light tanks. The failure of BV-33 to defend their outpost at Ban Houei Sane had negative consequences only a few weeks later, when the PAVN struck again at Lang Vei.

== Background ==
During the First Indochina War the Viet Minh constructed a pathway in neighbouring Laos in order to transport vital military supplies to southern Vietnam. Over time that pathway, now known as the Ho Chi Minh Trail, grew in importance as the government of the Democratic Republic of Vietnam sought to topple the rival government in the south, the Republic of Vietnam.

In the late 1950s, the Ho Chi Minh Trail was expanded to support the Viet Cong (VC)'s increasing military activities in South Vietnam. To protect this vital lifeline, the PAVN were deployed to take control of various areas in eastern Laos adjacent to the Vietnamese Demilitarized Zone. The increasing PAVN activities in those parts of Laos did not go unnoticed, as the governments of South Vietnam and Laos began working together to establish a small outpost at Ban Houei Sane for the purpose of monitoring PAVN movements in 1959.

In April 1961, the newly created Bataillon Volontaire 33 (BV-33) of the Royal Lao Army arrived at Ban Houei Sane, after it was forced to retreat from Tchephone by PAVN and Pathet Lao forces. At Ban Houei Sane, the Laotians constructed new defensive positions with assistance from the Army of the Republic of Vietnam (ARVN)'s 1st Infantry Division. One year later, BV-33 began monitoring North Vietnamese movements along the Vietnam-Laotian border.

== Battle ==
By the mid-1960s, when U.S military forces increased their presence in South Vietnam, the Laotian units at Ban Houei Sane also detected increasing PAVN movement along the Ho Chi Minh Trail. Towards the end of December 1967 six thousand trucks carrying supplies for PAVN/VC forces in southern Vietnam were detected moving down the Trail. That tremendous build-up came as a result of North Vietnam's decision to launch an all-out attack on Allied forces during the Tet celebrations.

In order to lure American combat units away from the major cities the North Vietnamese High Command decided to launch the first strike; on 21 January 1968, the PAVN began their attacks on the Khe Sanh Combat Base, where six thousand U.S. Marines were stationed. As part of that major effort, General Tran Quy Hai made the decision to knock out the small outpost of Ban Houei Sane once and for all, as the Royal Laotian Army's BV-33 was considered an important tool in the Allies' intelligence gathering effort.

On the night of 23 January 1968, the PAVN 24th Regiment struck the defenders of Ban Houei Sane from three directions. Initially the assault was spearheaded by the 3/24 Battalion with the 198th Armoured Battalion in support, but the first assault wave was delayed for various reasons. Firstly PAVN infantry and armoured corps lacked the experience in combined operations, secondly the local terrain posed many difficulties for the tank crews, causing the PT-76 light tanks to bog down attempting to cross a stream. By 06:00 Colonel Lê Công Phê ordered his troops to advance on Ban Houei Sane despite the delays of the 198th Armoured Battalion. As PAVN units moved towards the Laotian outpost, the PT-76's of the 198th Battalion turned up causing much confusion among the defenders.

On the day the PAVN launched their attacks, the weather was poor for aerial operations. As PAVN engineers blew up Laotian obstacles there was little that U.S. Forward Air Controllers could do to stop their advance as ground targets could not be identified. After three hours of fighting the Laotian commander, Lieutenant Colonel Soulang Phetsampou, informed the U.S. Forward Air Controllers that all Laotian positions had been overwhelmed and that they would abandon the outpost. At that point, the Laotian commander requested assistance from the CIDG camp at Lang Vei, to help evacuate his soldiers and their families. However assistance from Lang Vei would never arrive, so the soldiers of BV-33 and more than two thousand civilian refugees made their way eastward along Route 9, approaching the South Vietnamese border. On 24 January, the survivors of the Ban Houei Sane battle and their families reached the Lang Vei CIDG camp. Initially the military personnel at Lang Vei treated the Laotian refugees with caution, but they were finally given assistance when the Lang Vei camp commander allowed the Laotians to take up positions in the nearby Lang Vei village.

== The next target ==
For Captain Frank C. Willoughby, commander of the Lang Vei CIDG camp, the arrival of the Laotian refugees also brought some disturbing development on the battlefield. For the first time the PAVN deployed tanks in battle, and it was only fifteen kilometres away from Lang Vei. Fearing a repeat of the deadly PAVN attacks, BV-33 soldiers were allowed to assist local forces by conducting patrols around the CIDG camp. As the Laotians settled down in Lang Vei, the U.S. Air Force conducted airstrikes targeting the Ban Houei Sane airfield to prevent the PAVN from utilising the airfield for operations against Khe Sanh. On 30 January, Captain Willoughby's fears were confirmed when a PAVN soldier defected to the special forces at Lang Vei, and informed them of the whereabouts of the 304th Division. On 6 February 1968, the PAVN struck Lang Vei.

== See also ==
- Laotian Civil War
- Battle of Khe Sanh
