= Spencer Boyer =

American defense official

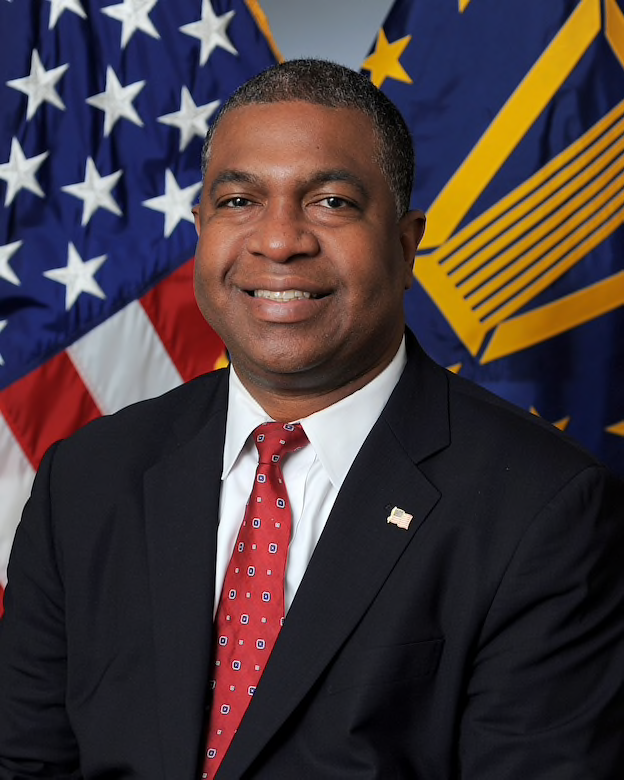

Deputy Assistant Secretary of Defense for Europe and NATO
- In office February 2021 – December 2023
- President: Joe Biden
- Secretary: Lloyd Austin
- Preceded by: Thomas Goffus

Deputy Assistant Secretary of State for European and Eurasian Affairs
- In office August 2009 – December 2011
- President: Barack Obama
- Secretary: Hillary Clinton

Personal details
- Party: Democratic
- Education: Wesleyan University (BA); New York University (MA, JD)

Spencer Phipps Boyer is an American foreign policy, national security, and international law and relations expert who served as deputy assistant secretary of defense for Europe and NATO in the Biden administration. Previously, Boyer served in the Obama administration in the State Department and Intelligence Community.

== Early life and education ==
The son of Spencer H. Boyer, the senior-most faculty member at the Howard University School of Law, he was raised in Washington, D.C. and graduated from Sidwell Friends School. He earned a Bachelor of Arts degree from Wesleyan University, followed by a Master of Arts in French studies from New York University and a Juris Doctor from New York University School of Law. He is fluent in French.

== Career ==
After graduating law school, Boyer joined the international law firm Jones Day in their Washington, D.C. practice. Two years later, he started his international law career clerking at the International Criminal Tribunal for the former Yugoslavia, then was a staff attorney at the Claims Resolution Tribunal for Dormant Accounts in Switzerland, and counsel at the International Court of Arbitration in Paris.

After returning to the United States, Boyer joined Georgetown University as the executive director of the Constitution Project at the McCourt School of Public Policy. Later, he was a fellow at the Center for American Progress where he was the Director for International Law and Diplomacy. From 2007 to 2008 Boyer was a Wasserstein Public Interest Fellow at Harvard Law School.

=== Obama administration ===
In January 2009, Boyer was named as deputy assistant secretary of state for European and Eurasian affairs with responsibility for Western Europe, where served for two years. He then joined the Center for Transatlantic Relations at the Paul H. Nitze School of Advanced International Studies at Johns Hopkins University a visiting scholar and senior fellow.

In 2014, Boyer rejoined government as the national intelligence officer for Europe at the National Intelligence Council for three years.

=== Policy and nonprofit work ===
After leaving government, Boyer was then named as the director of the Washington, D.C. office of the Brennan Center for Justice. A supporter of the Democratic Party, he was a fellow at Penn Biden Center for Diplomacy and Global Engagement at the University of Pennsylvania and later served on the foreign policy team for Biden's presidential campaign. In November 2020, Boyer was named a member of the Joe Biden presidential transition Agency Review Team to support transition efforts related to the Intelligence Community.

=== Biden administration ===
In February 2021, Boyer was named as the deputy assistant secretary of defense for Europe and NATO, leading the defense relationships and policy with NATO and EU nations.

=== Post-government ===
After leaving the Biden Administration in December 2023, Boyer joined Dartmouth College as the Magro Family Distinguished Fellow in International Affairs at the John Sloan Dickey Center for International Understanding.

In March 2024, Boyer joined DGA Group as Partner to lead a newly established National Security, Defense, and Aerospace practice.
