= Isaac Bear Early College High School =

American public school in North Carolina

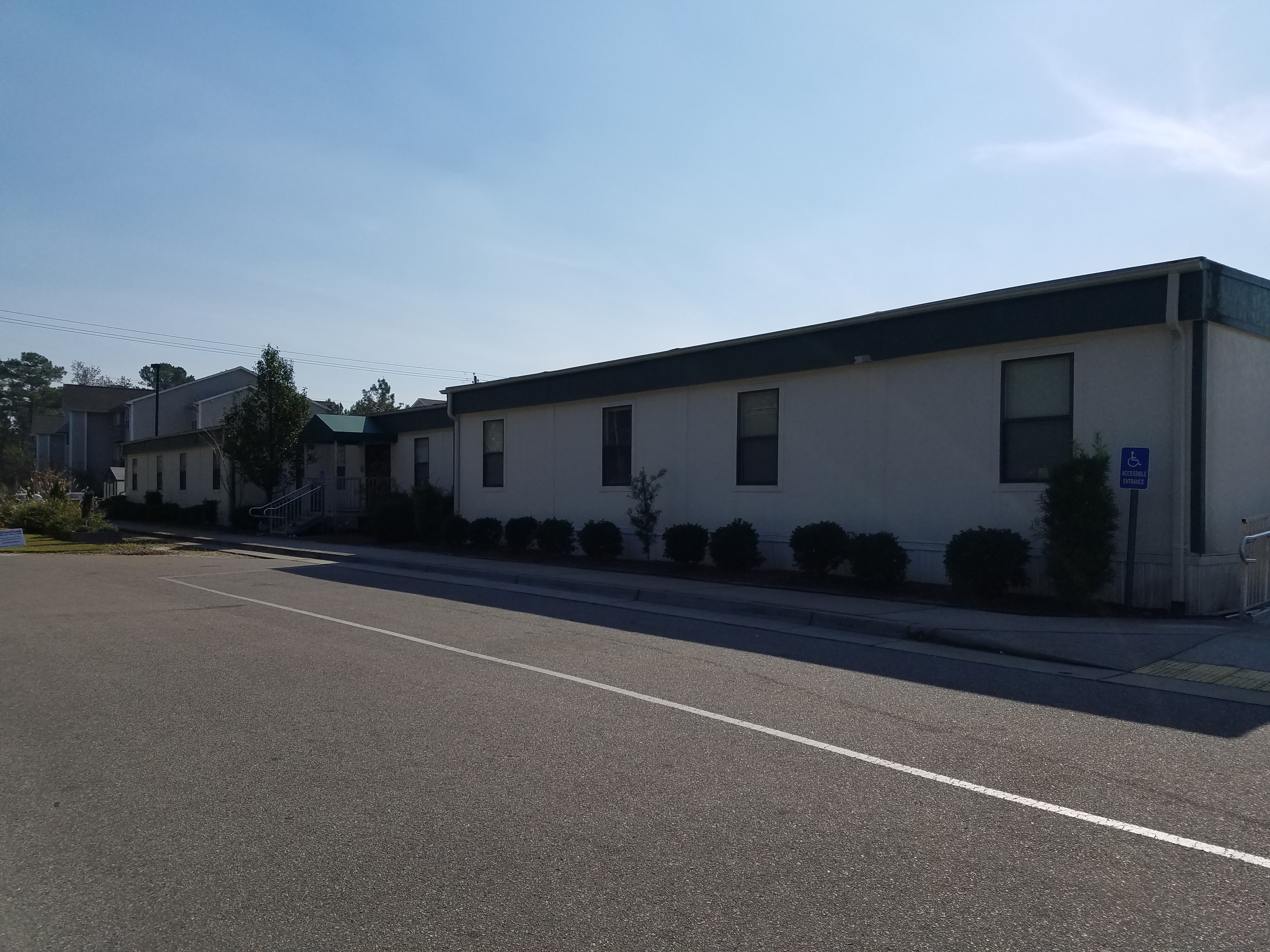

Location
- 630 MacMillan Avenue; Wilmington, North Carolina 28403; United States
- Coordinates: 34°13′07″N 77°52′43″W

Information
- Type: Public
- Motto: Achievement through Challenge and Citizenship
- Founded: 2006 (20 years ago)
- School district: New Hanover County Schools
- Superintendent: Charles Foust
- CEEB code: 344304
- Principal: Ronald Villines
- Teaching staff: 9.84 (FTE)
- Grades: 9–12
- Enrollment: 251 (2023-2024)
- Student to teacher ratio: 25.51
- Language: English
- Campus: University of North Carolina at Wilmington
- Colors: Teal and navy blue
- Mascot: Bearhawk
- Website: isaacbear.nhcs.net

Isaac Bear Early College High School, also called Isaac Bear, is a selective-enrollment school at 630 MacMillan Avenue, Wilmington, North Carolina.

== History ==
The premises of the school are situated on UNCW campus and were founded in the auditorium of Annie H. Snipes Elementary school in the year 2006.

New Hanover County Schools operates this school with the support of the University of North Carolina at Wilmington and the Gates Foundation. Students must apply to attend this school; no more than 100 submissions are accepted per year. As of the 2008–2009 school year, only 62–63 students were accepted. The program allows for students to work and earn up to 60 college credits, which, on average, are worth about $15,210. "As a partner in the North Carolina University System and the North Carolina New Schools Project, Isaac Bear Early College High School provides an accelerated, college-ready education by cultivating an environment of mature scholarship and leadership."

In 2019, New Hanover County’s state Rep. Deb Butler suggested UNCW designate a piece of land for a county-funded Isaac Bear building. She told Port City Daily in 2019 the conditions at Isaac Bear were “abysmal.” On May 27, 2022, the UNCW Board of Trustees approved plans to construct a two-story building for the selective-enrollment early college. The memorandum of agreement stated UNCW would provide around 1 acre of land to be used for up to a 44,000-square-foot building at the back of campus.

== Background and original building ==
The original Isaac Bear Building, located at Market and 13th Streets, served as the first home of Wilmington College, outside the public school system. Classes were first held there in 1947.

=== Namesake ===
Constructed in 1912, the name of the first building was given by Samuel Bear, Jr. (1854–1916) as a memorial to his brother, Isaac Bear. The Bear family, owners of an intrastate wholesale dry goods firm located on Front Street, made a number of large donations to better the community such as a wing to James Walker Memorial Hospital. Isaac Bear was known as "one of Wilmington's most capable and highly esteemed businessmen." He was a member of North State Lodge of B'nai B'rith, past Grand President of District Grand Lodge, and B.P.O.E Elks #532. Upon his death, the Isaac Bear Memorial School served to remember "the close friendship and devotion between the brothers and their interest in public welfare." The school and its name stands as a memorial to Samuel Bear Jr.'s original intentions—to honor his late brother Isaac.

== The Early College Program ==
Early College High Schools are small, autonomous schools where students complete all high school requirements and up to 60 hours of college credit during their four years of high school. Early College High Schools make higher education more accessible, affordable, and attractive by bridging the divide between high school and college; eliminate time wasted during the junior and senior years of high school and facilitate the transition of motivated students to higher education; provide intensive guidance and support from adults through the start of college coursework; and demonstrate new ways of integrating levels of schooling to better serve the intellectual and developmental needs of young people.

== The Gates Foundation contributions ==
In 2002, the Early College High School Initiative launched, funded by the Bill and Melinda Gates Foundation. Contributions from this organization, (totaling in over $124 million, as of 2008), assisted in the founding of over 230 early colleges across 28 of the 50 United States, 10 of these existing in North Carolina. It is because of these contributions that Isaac Bear and other Early College High School programs have been able to sustain themselves.

== Notable alumni ==
- George Pocheptsov, painter, philanthropist, and former child prodigy
