= List of Wasserstein Fellows =

Wasserstein Public Interest Fellows Program
- Description: Recognition program for exemplary members of the legal bar engaged in public service
- Country: United States
- Presented by: Harvard Law School

The Wasserstein Public Interest Fellows Program recognizes exemplary members of the bar who engage in public service. The program, founded in 1990 defines public service as "law-related work for governmental agencies, legal services providers, prosecutors, public defenders, private public interest law firms, nonprofit organizations and international organizations that provide legal assistance, conduct research, or engage in other activities aimed at advancing the common good." Academics and judges are ineligible for nomination (although they may go on to those roles). Fellows are invited to Harvard Law School to interact with students.

== Notable Fellows ==
- Theresa Amato
- Shara L. Aranoff
- Spencer Boyer
- Denise J. Casper, United States District Judge Massachusetts
- Brian Concannon
- Paul J. Fishman, United States Attorney for the District of New Jersey
- Andrew Fois
- Terry Goddard
- Edmund V. Ludwig, Federal District Judge
- John A. Powell
- Pierre-Richard Prosper
- Jonathan Rapping, a 2014 recipient of the MacArthur "Genius" Award
- Rod Rosenstein, Deputy Attorney General of the United States
- Azadeh Shahshahani
- Reggie Shuford
- James E. Tierney
- Leslie Winner

== See also ==
- List of awards for contributions to society
