= Eugene Ashley Jr. =

United States Army Medal of Honor recipient (1930–1968)

- Born: October 12, 1930; Wilmington, North Carolina, U.S.
- Died: February 7, 1968 (aged 37); Lang Vei, Quang Tri Province, Vietnam
- Burial place: Rockfish Memorial Park, Fayetteville, North Carolina
- Military career
- Allegiance: United States of America
- Branch: United States Army
- Service years: 1950–1968
- Rank: Sergeant First Class
- Units: Company C, 5th Special Forces Group; 1st Special Forces
- Conflicts: Korean War; Vietnam War: Battle of Lang Vei (DOW)
- Awards: Medal of Honor; Purple Heart

Eugene Ashley Jr. (October 12, 1930 – February 7, 1968) was a United States Army Special Forces soldier and a recipient of America's highest military decoration—the Medal of Honor—for his actions in the Vietnam War.

Ashley joined the Army in 1950 and took part in the Korean War. After being deployed to Vietnam, he took part in the Battle of Lang Vei, where he led an assault force to rescue encircled American forces. Ashley tried on five attempts, and on the fifth attempt was mortally wounded by a shell. He was awarded the Medal of Honor posthumously for these actions.

== Biography ==
Sgt. Ashley was born in Wilmington, North Carolina on October 12, 1930, to Eugene Ashley Sr. and Cornelia Ashley; he had a sister named Gertrude Ashley. Not long after his birth, his family moved to New York City, where Eugene Jr. attended Alexander Hamilton High School. Ashley joined the Army from New York City in December 1950 and served in the Korean War.

By February 6, 1968, Ashley was serving as a sergeant first class in Company C of the 5th Special Forces Group (Airborne), 1st Special Forces during the Vietnam War. On that day, Ashley led an assault force in an attempt to rescue American troops trapped by North Vietnamese infantry and tanks during the Battle of Lang Vei. He led several assaults against the enemy and was mortally wounded in his fifth and last attempt to reach the American forces. Ashley was subsequently awarded the Medal of Honor for his actions during the battle.

== Medal of Honor citation ==
Sergeant Ashley's Medal was posthumously awarded to his family at the White House by Vice President Spiro T. Agnew on December 2, 1969.

His official Medal of Honor citation reads:

Sfc. Ashley, distinguished himself by conspicuous gallantry and intrepidity while serving with Detachment A-101, Company C. Sfc. Ashley was the senior special forces Advisor of a hastily organized assault force whose mission was to rescue entrapped U.S. special forces advisors at Camp Lang Vei. During the initial attack on the special forces camp by North Vietnamese army forces, Sfc. Ashley supported the camp with high explosive and illumination mortar rounds. When communications were lost with the main camp, he assumed the additional responsibility of directing air strikes and artillery support. Sfc. Ashley organized and equipped a small assault force composed of local friendly personnel. During the ensuing battle, Sfc. Ashley led a total of 5 vigorous assaults against the enemy, continuously exposing himself to a voluminous hail of enemy grenades, machine gun and automatic weapons fire. Throughout these assaults, he was plagued by numerous booby-trapped satchel charges in all bunkers on his avenue of approach. During his fifth and final assault, he adjusted air strikes nearly on top of his assault element, forcing the enemy to withdraw and resulting in friendly control of the summit of the hill. While exposing himself to intense enemy fire, he was seriously wounded by machine gun fire but continued his mission without regard for his personal safety. After the fifth assault he lost consciousness and was carried from the summit by his comrades only to suffer a fatal wound when an enemy artillery round landed in the area. Sfc. Ashley displayed extraordinary heroism in risking his life in an attempt to save the lives of his entrapped comrades and commanding officer. His total disregard for his personal safety while exposed to enemy observation and automatic weapons fire was an inspiration to all men committed to the assault. The resolute valor with which he led 5 gallant charges placed critical diversionary pressure on the attacking enemy and his valiant efforts carved a channel in the overpowering enemy forces and weapons positions through which the survivors of Camp Lang Vei eventually escaped to freedom. Sfc. Ashley's bravery at the cost of his life was in the highest traditions of the military service, and reflects great credit upon himself, his unit, and the U.S. Army.

== Awards and Decorations ==

Badge	Combat Infantryman Badge with Star denoting 2nd award		
1st row	Medal of Honor		
2nd row	Bronze Star Medal	Purple Heart	Army Good Conduct Medal with 6 Good Conduct Loops
3rd row	National Defense Service Medal with 1 Oak leaf cluster	Korean Service Medal with 1 Campaign star	Vietnam Service Medal with 2 Campaign stars
4th row	United Nations Service Medal Korea	Vietnam Campaign Medal	Korean War Service Medal
Badge	Master Parachutist Badge		
Tab	Special Forces Tab		
Unit awards	Presidential Unit Citation		
Unit awards	Meritorious Unit Commendation	Korean Presidential Unit Citation	Republic of Vietnam Gallantry Cross Unit Citation with Palm

== Legacy ==
Eugene Ashley High School in Wilmington, North Carolina was named after him.

== See also ==
- List of Medal of Honor recipients for the Vietnam War
