= Toby Hernández =

Venezuelan baseball player

- Catcher
- Born: November 30, 1958 (age 67); Calabozo, Guárico, Venezuela
- Batted: Right Threw: Right

MLB debut
- June 22, 1984, for the Toronto Blue Jays

Last MLB appearance
- September 18, 1984, for the Toronto Blue Jays

MLB statistics
- Batting average: .500
- Home runs: 0
- Runs batted in: 0
- Stats at Baseball Reference

Teams
- Toronto Blue Jays (1984)

Rafael Tobías Hernández Alvarado (born November 30, 1958) is a Venezuelan former professional baseball catcher.

== Career ==
He played briefly for the Toronto Blue Jays of Major League Baseball (MLB) in its 1984 season.

Hernández was regarded as a good-fielding, light-hitting catcher in the Jays organization, but after a long history of injuries he was able to reach the majors just at 31. In his brief stint at Toronto, he went 1-for-2 and scored a run in three games.

Additionally, he posted a .223 average with 11 home runs and 122 RBI in parts of seven minor league seasons between 1979 and 1985.

In between, Hernández played winter ball with the Cardenales de Lara club of the Venezuelan League in a span of 14 seasons from 1978 through 1991.

== See also ==
- List of players from Venezuela in Major League Baseball
