= Reggie Shuford =

North Carolina-based lawyer and executive director of the North Carolina Justice Center

Reginald Shuford
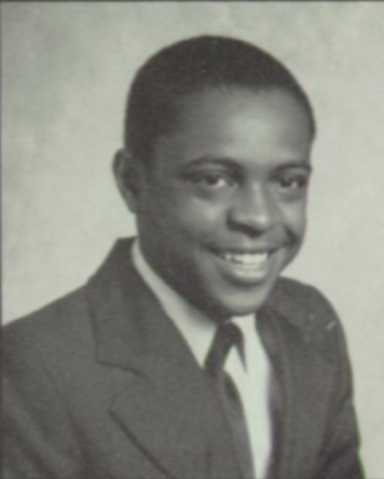
- Education: University of North Carolina at Chapel Hill BA; University of North Carolina School of Law JD
- Occupation: Executive Director
- Organization: North Carolina Justice Center

Reginald "Reggie" T. Shuford is a North Carolina–based lawyer and executive director of the North Carolina Justice Center.

== Early life and education ==
Shuford grew up in public housing in Wilmington, North Carolina, the third of five children. Shuford earned high grades at New Hanover High School, leading to a scholarship to attend Cape Fear Academy, where he was the first black graduate in 1984. His classmate Patrick Ballantine later recalled Shuford was accused of acting white by the black community in Wilmington, leaving Shuford "sandwiched by ridicule". Shuford has stated that the prejudice he experienced in his early education motivated him to pursue a legal career.

Shuford went on to attend the University of North Carolina at Chapel Hill and University of North Carolina School of Law, where he earned his JD and was president of his law class. While attending law school, he was roommates with Jonathan Luna.

== Legal career ==
Throughout his career, Shuford has concentrated on social justice and civil rights. After graduation, he served as a clerk for Henry Frye, the first black chief justice of the North Carolina Supreme Court. Shuford has described Justice Frye as a legal role model who helped Shuford become a better writer.

Shuford served as a staff attorney for the ACLU's racial justice program from 1995 to 2010. Shuford represented the ACLU in Green v. TSA (2004), a challenge to the No Fly List.

In 2011, Shuford was named executive director of the Pennsylvania ACLU. In 2013, he defended a transgender student at a Philadelphia suburban high school who was forced to use his birth name.

Shuford oversaw the Pennsylvania ACLU's effort against Pennsylvania's voter ID law and prohibition on same-sex marriage, both of which were overturned. Shuford has also been involved in advocacy against perceived police brutality, including the New Jersey Safe Stop program.

In 2019, Shuford was involved in a lawsuit challenging Pennsylvania's bail system.

In 2023, Shuford was named executive director of the North Carolina Justice Center, a Raleigh-based progressive policy and advocacy nonprofit.

== Awards ==
In 2016, Pennsylvania State University Law's Black Law Students Association and Penn State's Multicultural Undergraduate Law Association presented Shuford with the Living Legal Legend Award, which recognizes an individual who displays a strong commitment to fight for justice and diversity. In 2009-2010 Shuford was a Wasserstein Fellow at Harvard Law School.

== Selected writings ==
- Why Affirmative Action Remains Essential in the Age of Obama
