= Ron Musselman =

American baseball player (born 1954)

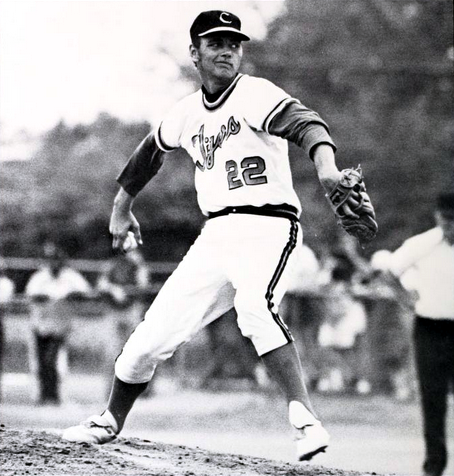
- Musselman pitching for Clemson in 1977
- Pitcher
- Born: November 11, 1954 (age 71); Wilmington, North Carolina, U.S.
- Batted: Right Threw: Right

MLB debut
- August 18, 1982, for the Seattle Mariners

Last MLB appearance
- August 23, 1985, for the Toronto Blue Jays

MLB statistics
- Win–loss record: 4–2
- Earned run average: 3.73
- Strikeouts: 47
- Stats at Baseball Reference

Teams
- Seattle Mariners (1982); Toronto Blue Jays (1984–1985)

Ralph Ronald Musselman (born November 11, 1954) is an American former Major League Baseball (MLB) pitcher for the Seattle Mariners (1982) and Toronto Blue Jays (1984-1985). Prior to turning professional, he played for the Clemson Tigers.

== Playing career ==
Musselman attended John T. Hoggard High School in Wilmington, North Carolina, winning the state baseball championship in 1972. He then played college baseball at Louisburg College for two years, helping the team reach the Junior College World Series in 1975 by pitching 15 innings in an elimination game, striking out 20 batters. He then played for Clemson, where the Tigers reached the College World Series twice. He was named to the All-Atlantic Coast Conference team in both seasons. He threw a no-hitter against the Virginia Cavaliers on April 17, 1976.

After not signing after being drafted twice previously, the Mariners selected Musselman in the fifth round of the 1977 MLB draft. He became primarily a relief pitcher in the minor leagues and was coached by former MLB players Mel Stottlemyre and Bobby Floyd. He suffered a right rib cage injury in 1981. Musselman made his MLB debut in 1982, pitching mostly in a mop-up role. After the season, Seattle traded him to the Texas Rangers for Pat Putnam.

Musselman spent 1983 in the minors in the Rangers organization, where he worked on his forkball. Toronto purchased his contract in June 1984. He returned to the majors in August. His lone MLB save came on September 24, when he pitched 2/3 of an inning, closing out a 9–8 Blue Jays victory over the Boston Red Sox. Musselman was on Toronto's Opening Day roster in 1985, but was released during the season and remained with the team as a batting practice pitcher as they won the American League East division.

Musselman signed with the Cleveland Indians ahead of the 1986 season but he opted out of a minor league assignment after spring training. He returned to the minors with the Blue Jays. He pitched for two Triple-A teams in 1987 before retiring.

== Personal life ==
Following his baseball career, Musselman ran a landscaping firm. He is also a real estate agent and has owned a bar in Wilmington.

Musselman has been married twice. With his first wife, he is the father of professional golfer Lucas Glover, though he was not heavily involved in raising his son. He and his second wife have two children. Musselman has three siblings.

Musselman was inducted into the Greater Wilmington Sports Hall of Fame in 2025.
