= Battle of Lang Vei =

1968 battle in the Vietnam War

- Part of the Vietnam War
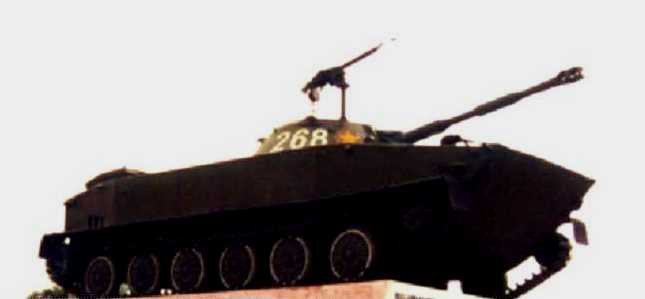
- A North Vietnamese Army (PAVN) PT-76 amphibious tank, the same type fielded at the battle at Lang Vei by the North Vietnamese, on display as a battle-victory commemorative monument.
Date	6–7 February 1968
Location	Lang Vei Special Forces Camp, Quảng Trị Province, South Vietnam 16.600°N 106.668°E
Result	North Vietnamese victory

Belligerents
North Vietnam	United States; South Vietnam; Laos

Commanders and leaders
Le Cong Phe	Frank C. Willoughby

Strength
3 Infantry battalions 2 Sapper companies 2 Armored companies (14 PT-76 light tanks)	24 U.S. Special Forces; 500 Montagnard and Vietnamese CIDG soldiers 350 Royal Lao Army soldiers

Casualties and losses
90 killed 7 tanks destroyed or damaged	(South Vietnam) 200+ killed/missing 119 captured (United States) 7 killed 3 captured 42 killed 100+ captured

The Battle of Lang Vei (Vietnamese: Trận Làng Vây) began on the evening of 6 February 1968 and concluded during the early hours of 7 February, in Quảng Trị Province, South Vietnam. Towards the end of 1967, the 198th Tank Battalion of the People's Army of Vietnam's (PAVN) 202nd Armored Regiment received instructions from the North Vietnamese Ministry of Defense to reinforce the 304th Division as part of the Route 9–Khe Sanh Campaign. After an arduous journey down the Ho Chi Minh trail in January 1968, the 198th Tank Battalion linked up with the 304th Division for an offensive along Highway 9, which stretched from the Laotian border through to Quảng Trị Province. On 23 January, the 24th Regiment attacked the small Laotian outpost at Bane Houei Sane, under the control of the Royal Laos Army BV-33 "Elephant" Battalion. In that battle, the 198th Tank Battalion failed to reach the battle on time because its crews struggled to navigate their tanks through the rough local terrain. However, as soon as the PT-76 tanks of the 198th Tank Battalion turned up at Bane Houei Sane, the Laotian soldiers and their families retreated into South Vietnam.

After Bane Houei Sane was captured, the 24th Regiment prepared for another attack which targeted the U.S. Special Forces Camp at Lang Vei, manned by Detachment A-101 of the 5th Special Forces Group and indigenous Civilian Irregular Defense Group (CIDG) forces. On 6 February, the 24th Regiment, again supported by the 198th Tank Battalion, launched their assault on Lang Vei. Despite artillery and air support, the U.S.-led forces conceded ground and the PAVN quickly dominated their positions. By the early hours of 7 February the command bunker was the only position still held by Allied forces. To rescue the American survivors inside the Lang Vei Camp, a counterattack was mounted, but the Laotian soldiers who formed the bulk of the attack formation refused to fight the PAVN. Later on, U.S. Special Forces personnel were able to escape from the camp, and were rescued by a U.S. Marine task force from Khe Sanh Combat Base.

== Background ==
=== North Vietnam ===
The task of capturing Lang Vei was entrusted to the PAVN's 24th Regiment, 304th Division, led by Colonel Le Cong Phe. The regiment was to be supported by the 2nd Battalion (part of the 101D Regiment, 325th Division), the 2nd Artillery Battalion (part of the 675th Artillery Regiment), one tank company (part of the 198th Tank Battalion, 203rd Armored Regiment), two sapper companies, one anti-aircraft gun company, and one flamethrower platoon. One of the most important features of the PAVN formation were the elements of the 203rd Armoured Regiment; the "Route 9-Khe Sanh Campaign" marked the first time the PAVN deployed its armored forces on the battlefield. In 1964, soldiers of the PAVN's first armored unit—the 202nd Armored Regiment—was sent into South Vietnam without their T-34 medium tanks, because their prime mission was to learn enemy armor tactics in order to prepare for future missions. On 22 June 1965, the North Vietnamese Ministry of Defense passed Resolution 100/QD-QP, to establish the 203rd Armored Regiment and Resolution 101/QD-QP to create an Armored Force Command.

For PAVN commanders, the creation of an independent armored force command represented a significant milestone in the development of their army, because it enabled them to respond to the circumstances on the battlefield with a modern armored force. To prepare for their upcoming mission, the 203rd Armored Regiment undertook a series of combined-arms training with infantry and artillery units in different types of terrain, in order to operate in Vietnam's rough mountainous and jungle conditions. On 5 August 1967, the Ministry of Defense ordered the 203rd Armored Regiment to form a sub-unit, namely the 198th Tank Battalion equipped with 22 PT-76 amphibious tanks, to bolster the strength of the 304th Division in South Vietnam. From their base in Luong Son, Hòa Bình Province, the 198th Tank Battalion began their arduous 1,350 kilometers (840 mi) journey down the Ho Chi Minh Trail under constant U.S. air-strikes. In January 1968, the 198th Tank Battalion arrived on the field where it joined the 304th Division for an attack on the Laotian outpost of Ban Houei Sane.

=== United States/South Vietnam ===
The Lang Vei Special Forces Camp was placed under the control of the United States Army's Detachment A-101, Company C, 5th Special Forces Group, to train and equip locally recruited Vietnamese through the CIDG program. Detachment A-101 had originally been established in July 1962 at Khe Sanh. In 1966, Detachment A-101 moved to its first site near the village of Lang Vei, when the United States Marines took control of Khe Sanh Combat Base as part of an American military build-up in South Vietnam's northern provinces. However, the first camp at Lang Vei proved to be only temporary, as the PAVN attacked the camp on 4 May 1967. Even though the PAVN attack was repelled, damage to the camp was extensive. Since the original site lacked good observation and fields of fire beyond the barbed-wire perimeter, the 5th Special Forces Group commander decided to move the camp to a more suitable area, about 1,000 meters to the west. The new camp, on Highway 9 about 7 kilometers (4.3 mi) to the west of Khe Sanh, was completed in 1967.

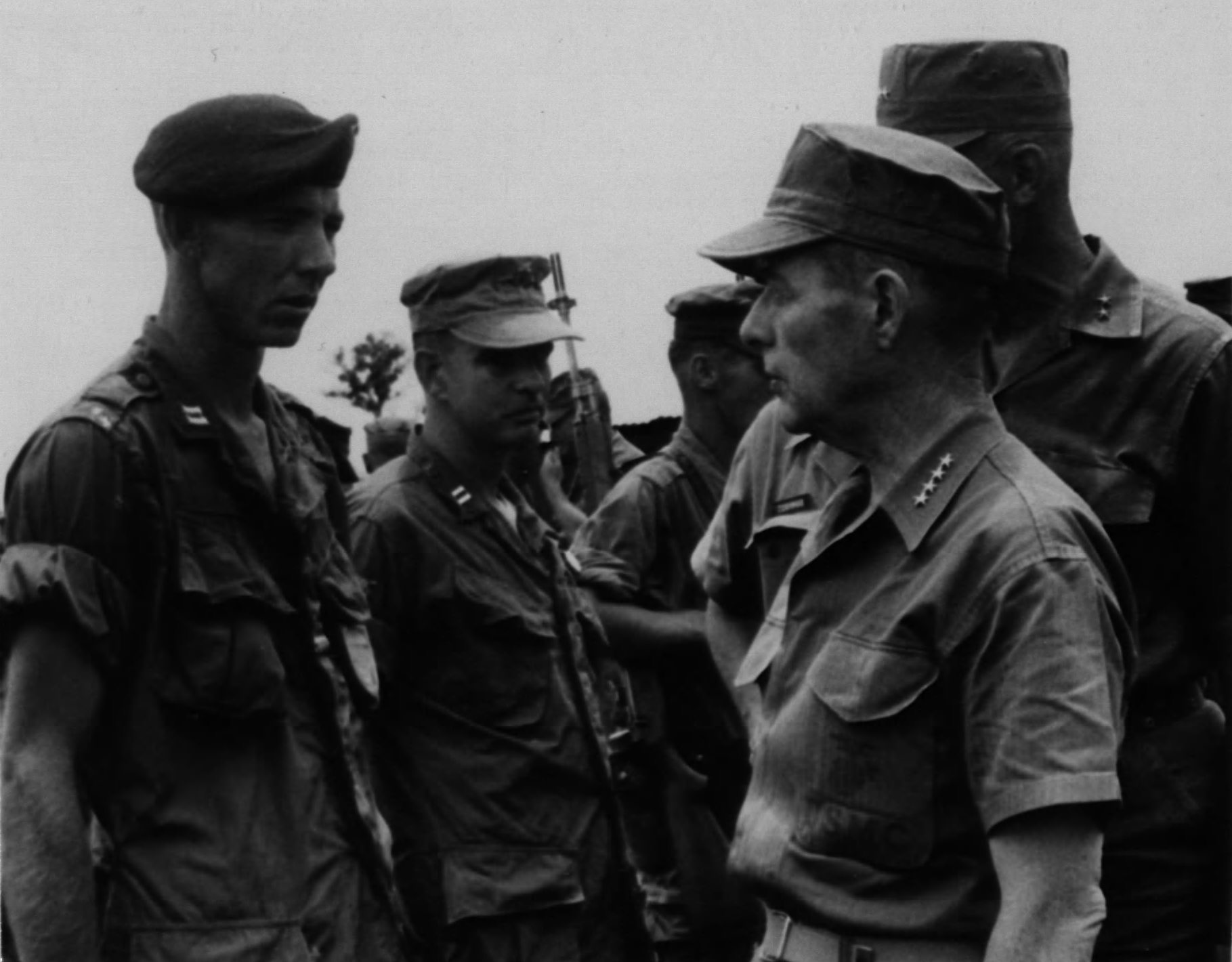
Captain Frank C. Willoughby converses with Marine Corps commandant General Wallace M. Greene at Khe Sanh Combat Base, 9 August 1967

In 1967, Captain Franklin C. Willoughby assumed command of Detachment A-101 at Lang Vei, which had a tactical area of responsibility of 220 square kilometers (85 sq mi), and was one of nine operational CIDG camps in I Corps Tactical Zone. From Lang Vei, U.S Special Forces personnel worked jointly with a 14-man Army of the Republic of Vietnam (ARVN) special forces contingent and six interpreters; they were responsible for border surveillance, interdiction of enemy infiltration and assistance in the Revolutionary Development Program. To accomplish those tasks Willoughby had one Montagnard company, three South Vietnamese rifle companies and three combat reconnaissance platoons at his disposal. Early in January 1968, Detachment A-101 received reinforcements in the form of a Mobile Strike Force Company, consisting of 161 Hre tribesmen, along with six U.S. Special Forces advisors. Elements of this Mobile Strike Force Company operated from a fortified bunker about 800 meters west of the camp, which served as an observation post. During the day the Hre tribesmen of the Mobile Strike Force conducted patrols; at night they took up ambush positions in the vicinity of the camp.

Prior to the battle, Willoughby placed Company 101 of 82 Bru Montagnard tribesmen, on the northeastern flank of the camp, with the 3rd Combat Reconnaissance Platoon positioned just behind it. Company 104 was placed in the southern end of the camp; Company 102, consisting of 42 men, was positioned at the opposite end about 450 meters to the west, while the 43-man Company 103 was positioned further south. The 1st and 2nd Combat Reconnaissance Platoons were placed at the northern and southern perimeters respectively, about 200 meters apart. Individually, the CIDG personnel carried M1 and M2 carbines with nearly 250,000 rounds of ammunition, and each company was also equipped with one 81 mm mortar. Among heavy weapons, there were two 106mm recoilless rifles, two 4.2-inch mortars and nineteen 60 mm mortars positioned around the camp. For close-in support, the CIDG personnel were furnished with 100 disposable M-72 anti-tank weapons. Antitank mines were requested, but were denied. If necessary, Willoughby could also request support from at least two rifle companies from the 26th Marine Regiment at Khe Sanh, along with artillery support from other locations within range.

Following the construction of the new camp site west of Lang Vei, Willoughby and his CIDG soldiers concentrated their efforts on strengthening the camp's defenses, and they made relatively few contacts with the PAVN. However, unbeknownst to Willoughby, the PAVN 304th Division had assembled on the battlefield, reinforced by the 198th Tank Battalion, with the following orders: the 66th Regiment was given the task of capturing Khe Sanh village, part of Hướng Hóa District, to begin their "Route 9-Khe Sanh Campaign"; the 24th Regiment was ordered to destroy the enemy strongholds of Ban Houei Sane and Lang Vei; the 9th Regiment was ordered to destroy any reinforcements that might try to relieve those bases areas. From December 1967, CIDG soldiers operating from Lang Vei began to report more frequent contacts with the PAVN. By mid-January, U.S. military intelligence also reported movements of PAVN formations across the Xe Pone River from Laos into South Vietnam. At the same time, the PAVN began to harass the Lang Vei Camp with mortar and artillery fire at least two or three times a week, and PAVN patrols probed the camp's perimeters. 3rd Marine Division intelligence estimated the combat strength of PAVN and Viet Cong forces in the Vietnamese Demilitarized Zone area during this period was 40,943 troops.

== Preliminary attacks ==
On 21 January 1968, the PAVN 66th Regiment began its attack on Khe Sanh village, seat of the Hướng Hóa local government. At that time, Khe Sanh village was defended by the ARVN Regional Force 915th Company and the U.S. Marines Combined Action Company Oscar. Throughout the night, the combined U.S and South Vietnamese forces held their position, but at dawn U.S. soldiers on the ground called in air strikes and artillery support from the Khe Sanh Combat Base. Fighting in and around Khe Sanh village continued throughout the day and into the following night, and was finally captured by the PAVN at 09:30 on 22 January. At 11:00 Colonel David E. Lownds ordered Company D, 1st Battalion, 26th Marines, to relieve the defenders inside Khe Sanh village, but reversed his orders after second thoughts about PAVN ambushes. Later, the ARVN Regional Force 256th Company was destroyed by the PAVN 9th Regiment as it marched to Khe Sanh village. The PAVN 66th Regiment paid a heavy price for their victory with 154 killed and 496 wounded.

On the evening of 23 January, one day after the fall of Khe Sanh village, the PAVN 304th Division moved against their next target, the small Laotian outpost at Ban Houei Sane. Prior to 1968, Laotian forces at Ban Houei Sane had played an important role in the war, watching PAVN infiltration into South Vietnam from a section of the Ho Chi Minh Trail running through Laos. The outpost was manned by 700 Laotian soldiers of BV-33 "Elephant" Battalion, Royal Laos Army, led by Lieutenant Colonel Soulang Phetsampou. As night fell, the PAVN 3rd Battalion, 24th Regiment attacked the outpost. The 198th Tank Battalion, which was tasked with supporting the 24th Regiment, was delayed as their tank crews tried to navigate their PT-76 amphibious tanks through the rough local terrain. However, confusion quickly descended on the Laotian defenders as the PT-76 tanks turned up outside their outpost. After three hours of fighting, Lt. Col. Phetsampou decided to abandon his outpost, so he radioed the Lang Vei Camp and requested helicopters to evacuate his men and their families. However, as helicopters were unavailable, the Laotians decided to move eastward by foot along Highway 9, in an attempt to reach Lang Vei just across the border in South Vietnam.

Following the loss of both Khe Sanh village and Ban Houei Sane, thousands of civilian refugees made their way towards Lang Vei village and the Special Forces camp. With an estimated 8,000 non-combatants within a thousand meters of his camp, Willoughby radioed Da Nang for assistance. This arrived on 25 January in the form of food and medical supplies, along with a six-man Special Forces augmentation team. The Laotian soldiers of BV-33, with assistance from the new Special Forces team, were given materials to restore the old Lang Vei Camp, where they would remain until further orders were issued from Da Nang. The Laotian soldiers and their families brought with them stories of a PAVN attack supported by tanks, which was a cause for concern for Willoughby, because Ban Houei Sane was only 15 kilometers (9.3 mi) away across the border. On 30 January Willoughby's fears were confirmed when a PAVN deserter, Private Luong Dinh Du, surrendered himself to the U.S. Special Forces in Lang Vei. Under interrogation, Private Du revealed that tracked vehicles were positioned near his unit, but a planned attack was canceled twice for unknown reasons.

== Battle ==
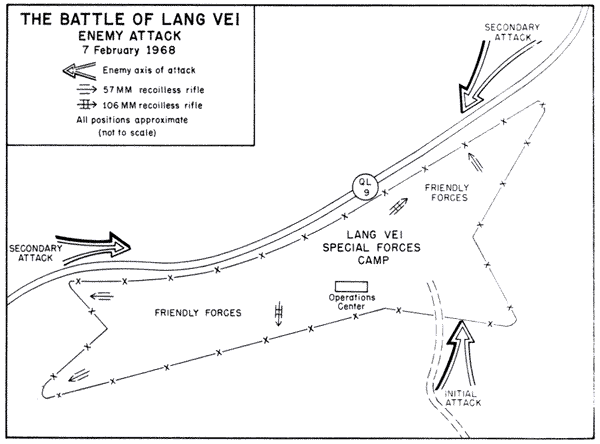
Attack on Lang Vei

In response to the threat posed by the PAVN, Willoughby stepped up daytime patrols and night ambushes around his camp. On the morning of February 6, the PAVN fired mortars into the Lang Vei compound, wounding eight Camp Strike Force soldiers. That afternoon, Lt. Col. Daniel F. Shungel, commander of Company C, 5th Special Forces Group, flew into Lang Vei from Da Nang as a diplomatic gesture towards the Laotian commander Lt. Col. Phetsampou. At 18:10, the PAVN followed up their morning mortar attack with an artillery attack from 152 mm howitzers, firing 60 rounds into the camp. The bombardment wounded two more Strike Force soldiers and damaged two bunkers. Then at 23:30, PAVN artillery started pounding the camp, which covered the movement of the 24th Regiment and the 3rd Battalion, 101D Regiment. From an observation post above the tactical operations centre, Sergeant Nickolas Fragos saw the first PAVN tanks moving along Lang Troai Road, attempting to breach the barbed wire in front of Company 104. He immediately went down to the tactical operations center and described what he had witnessed to Willoughby; Shungel then advised Willoughby to concentrate all available artillery and air support on the PAVN formation just in front of Company 104. Soon afterwards, three PT-76 tanks were knocked out by a 106 mm recoilless rifle manned by Sergeant First Class James W. Holt, but the barbed wire in front of Company 104 was quickly overrun by the combined PAVN tank-infantry attack.

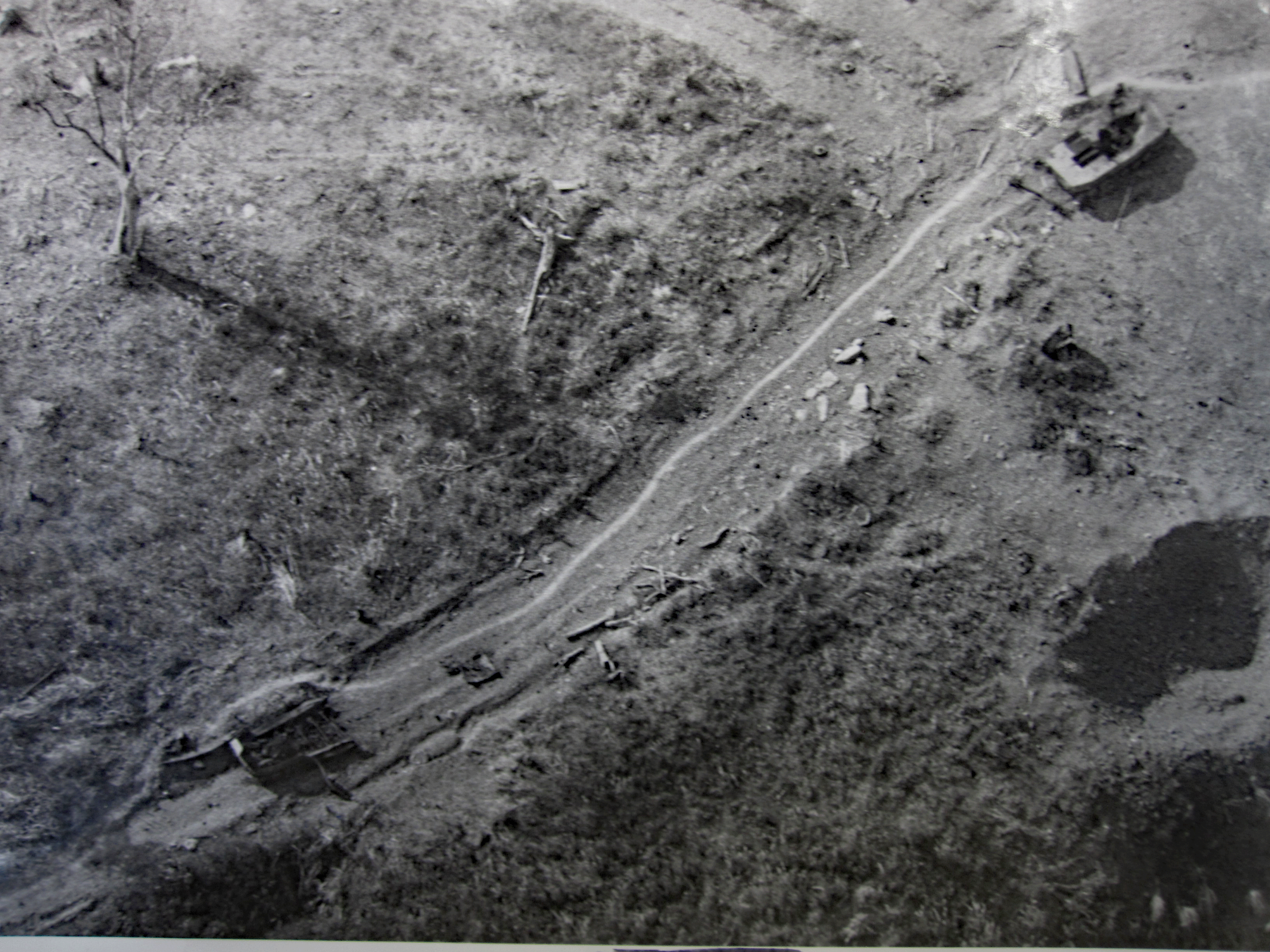
A PT-76 tank, destroyed by American anti-tank weapons, lies dormant along a road after the battle at the Lang Vei Special Forces Camp

Meanwhile, from inside the tactical operations center, Willoughby was busy calling in air and artillery support. He also radioed the 26th Marines at Khe Sanh to request the deployment of two rifle companies as part of the reinforcement plan, but his request was denied. Believing that the attack on Company 104 was the enemy's main effort, Willoughby concentrated his artillery support there during the early stages of the battle. About 10 minutes after the artillery had begun firing, a U.S. Air Force forward air-controller arrived over Lang Vei along with a flareship and an AC-119 Shadow gunship. Willoughby then requested air strikes on the ravines north of the camp, on Lang Troai Road, and the areas west of the early warning outpost manned by the Hre soldiers of the Mobile Strike Force. Despite the ferocity of the air strikes and artillery fire, the PAVN managed to break through the Company 104 area, forcing the defenders to retreat into the 2nd and 3rd Combat Reconnaissance Platoon positions behind them. By 01:15, the PAVN had captured the entire eastern end of the camp and, from the Company 104 area, began pouring fire on Company 101.

At the opposite end of the camp, three PT-76 tanks rolled through the barbed wire barrier in front of Company 102 and 103. Point blank, the tank crews destroyed several bunkers with their guns, forcing the soldiers of Company 102 and 103 to abandon their positions. Those who survived the onslaught either retreated to the reconnaissance positions, or along Highway 9, toward Khe Sanh in the east. About 800 meters to the west, Sergeant First Class Charles W. Lindewald, an adviser to the Mobile Strike Force, also reported back to Willoughby that the early warning outpost was in danger of being overrun. To save it, Lindewald directed artillery strikes on the PAVN troops moving up towards his outpost, but he later died from a gunshot wound to the stomach as the PAVN overran the outpost. At about 01:30, Shungel and his hastily organized tank-killer teams were busy engaging the tanks that were roaming the Company 104 area; on many occasions the M-72 rockets fired by the Americans either missed completely, jammed, misfired, or simply failed to knock out the enemy tanks. By 02:30, the PAVN had broken through the inner perimeter of the camp, and began harassing the soldiers trapped inside the tactical operations center, which included Willoughby along with seven other Americans, three South Vietnamese special forces, and 26 CIDG soldiers.

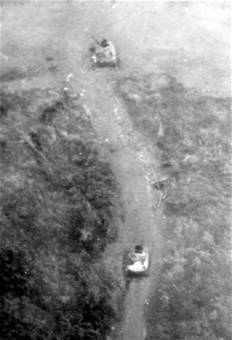
Photograph taken by U.S. Air Force reconnaissance aircraft showing two destroyed PT-76 tanks in Lang Vei

Above ground, U.S. and ARVN soldiers who had escaped death or capture tried to escape from the PAVN. From the team house, a group of four Americans and about 50 CIDG soldiers held a quick conference and decided that they would leave the camp through the northern perimeter, where there was no visible sign of the PAVN. Without much difficulty, the Americans and the CIDG soldiers were able to make it through the barbed-wire barrier, but PAVN soldiers on the eastern side of the camp detected their movement and began firing on the group. Ultimately, only two Americans and about 10 Vietnamese soldiers managed to escape from the camp, taking refuge in a dry creek bed that offered some cover and concealment. At around 03:30, Willoughby made another request for the Marines at Khe Sanh to send reinforcements, but again his request was turned down. In an attempt to save the defenders at Lang Vei, Company C Headquarters in Da Nang tried to call for reinforcements from the Marines at Khe Sanh, but its request was also turned down. Finally, Company C Headquarters placed another Mobile Strike Force Company and a company-sized unit on standby alert in Da Nang, to be airlifted into battle as soon as helicopters were available.

Back in Lang Vei, the PAVN continued to harass the small force of soldiers still trapped in the command bunker with hand grenades, explosives and bursts of gunfire down the stairwell that led into the bunker. Shortly after 06:00, the PAVN threw several fragmentation grenades and tear gas grenades down the stairwell. Then, a voice called down the stairwell in Vietnamese, demanding the American-led forces give up at once. Following a quick discussion with his CIDG soldiers, the South Vietnamese special forces commander led his troops up the stairwell to surrender, but were killed by PAVN soldiers, leaving behind their American counterparts. After the South Vietnamese had gone up, there was another short verbal exchange between the Americans in the bunker and the PAVN in English, which was followed by another firefight when the Americans refused surrender. At 06:30, the PAVN successfully blasted a hole on the northern wall, gaining direct access into the command bunker. However, instead of launching a direct attack on the last American stronghold, the PAVN continued to throw grenades through the wall.

At dawn, Sergeant First Class Eugene Ashley Jr. assembled about 100 Laotian soldiers of BV-33 at the old Lang Vei Camp in order to launch a rescue operation and, if possible, recapture the Special Forces Camp from the PAVN. Even though Lt. Col. Phetsampou had initially refused to take part in the operation, the Americans held him to his earlier promise of providing them with troops. After Ashley had formed the Laotian soldiers into a skirmish line, he radioed the forward air-controllers overhead to direct strafing runs on the Special Forces camp to soften up the enemy.

Meanwhile, as COMUSMACV General William Westmoreland learned of the PAVN attack on Lang Vei and Lownd's refusal to send a relief force, he ordered the U.S. Marines to supply enough helicopters to airlift a 50-man strike force to rescue the survivors. Subsequently, Colonel Jonathan F. Ladd, commanding officer of the 5th Special Forces Group, and Major General Norman J. Anderson, commander of the 1st Marine Aircraft Wing were directed to formulate a rescue plan. While Willoughby and his men waited for help in the command bunker, Ashley and his Laotian contingent cautiously entered the Special Forces camp.

The Laotian soldiers were evidently reluctant to advance on the PAVN, and only inched forward when the Americans ordered them to do so. In their first attempt to break through PAVN lines, Ashley and his men were beaten back. Undeterred, the American-led forces tried to penetrate PAVN positions several times, and only stopped after Ashley was shot in the chest and later killed by an exploding artillery round. Ashley was later posthumously awarded the Medal of Honor. The Laotians, who feared the PAVN, disengaged from the fight and fled. After Ashley's final attack had failed, Willoughby and his men made the decision to abandon their position. However, after Specialist Four James L. Moreland was mortally wounded, Willoughby decided to leave him in the bunker, because the remaining Americans were in no physical condition to carry out the wounded man. Under the cover of U.S. air strikes, Willoughby and other American survivors escaped towards the old Lang Vei Camp, which was evacuated by Marine CH-46s from HMM-262, which lifted in a 50-man reaction force. By 17:30 on 7 February, all known survivors had been evacuated to Khe Sanh.

== Aftermath ==
The fight for Lang Vei, though short in duration, was a costly endeavor for both sides. In their efforts to hold the camp, the combined Montagnard and South Vietnamese CIDG soldiers suffered 309 killed, 64 wounded, and 122 captured. Of the original 24 Americans who took part in the battle, seven were killed in action, 11 sustained injuries, and three were captured. Nearly all of the camp's weaponry and equipment were either destroyed or captured by enemy forces. For the North Vietnamese, the battle for Lang Vei marked the first successful use of armor in the war. In terms of human casualties, the PAVN claimed to have lost 90 soldiers killed and 220 wounded.

On the evening of 7 February, though the fight was over for the military forces, the ordeal continued for the civilians who were caught in the fighting. An estimated 6,000 survivors from the old Lang Vei Camp including CIDG soldiers and their families, Montagnard tribesmen and the Laotians, followed the Americans and descended on the Khe Sanh Combat Base. However, when they reached the American compound, Lownds refused to give them entry because he feared that PAVN soldiers may have mingled with the crowd. Instead, Lownds ordered his soldiers to herd the civilians into bomb craters, disarmed the local soldiers, and kept them under guard even though PAVN artillery shells continued to rain down on the base. No food or medical aid was given to the civilians as they were kept outside the wires of the American compound. Frustrated by the lack of support and poor treatment by the Americans, Phetsampou complained that his people were being treated more like an enemy. On 10 February, Laotian civilian refugees started walking back to Laos along Highway 9, because they feared for their lives and preferred to die in their own country. On 15 February, through arrangements made by the Laotian embassy in Saigon, Phetsampou and his soldiers were flown back to their country on a Royal Laotian Air Force C-47 transport aircraft.

== See also ==
- Battle of Ban Houei Sane
- Battle of Khe Sanh
