= New Hanover High School =

American public school in North Carolina

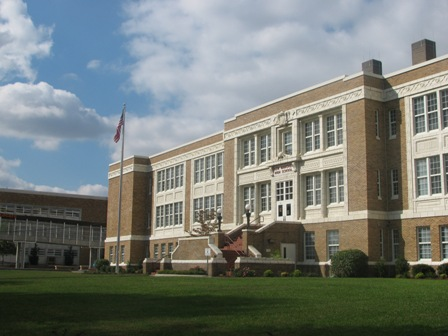
- New Hanover High School, October 2009

Location
- 1307 Market Street; Wilmington, North Carolina 28401; United States; 34°14′16″N 77°55′59″W

Information
- Type: Public
- Founded: 1922 (104 years ago)
- School district: New Hanover County Schools
- Superintendent: Charles Foust
- CEEB code: 344350
- Principal: Philip Sutton
- Teaching staff: 97.13 (FTE)
- Grades: 9–12
- Enrollment: 1,515 (2023–2024)
- Student to teacher ratio: 15.60
- Language: English
- Colors: Orange and black
- Athletics: NCHSAA 7A
- Athletics conference: Carolina Coast 6A/7A/8A
- Mascot: Wildcat
- Website: newhanoverhs.nhcs.net

New Hanover High School is a high school in downtown Wilmington, North Carolina. New Hanover High is the oldest existing high school in Wilmington. It is a part of New Hanover County Schools.

New Hanover is the most diverse high school in New Hanover County. The school's ethnicity is 50% Caucasian, 43% African American, 5% Hispanic, and 2% of other ethnic classification. The school has an enrollment of 1,721 students and a staff of 930.

== History ==
The original school building was designed by William J. Wilkins. Construction started in 1920, and was completed in 1922. New Hanover High underwent a complete renovation at the start of the 21st century.

== Sports ==
The tradition of Wildcat Athletics is exemplified in having won over 30 North Carolina High School Athletic Association (NCHSAA) State Championships: 14 men's basketball, 5 baseball, 4 football, 3 men's tennis, 3 softball, and 3 men's golf.

== In popular culture ==
The high school's gym was featured in a season 4 episode of the TV series One Tree Hill when the Tree Hill Ravens played their state semi-final game vs. Verona. It was also featured in the 1987 film Hiding Out, 1989 film Dream a Little Dream, and in the film Blue Velvet.

== Notable alumni ==
- Kadeem Allen (born 1993), basketball player in the NBA and currently for Hapoel Haifa in the Israeli Basketball Premier League
- Cody Arnoux, professional soccer player
- Nick Becton, NFL offensive tackle
- Charlie Boney, architect
- David Brinkley, longtime news anchor for NBC and ABC; famous for the Huntley-Brinkley Report and This Week
- Lauren Collins, staff writer for The New Yorker
- Alge Crumpler, NFL tight end (2001–2010) and four-time Pro Bowl player
- Rod Delmonico, former baseball coach at the University of Tennessee
- Roman Gabriel, NFL quarterback, four-time Pro Bowl player and first team All-Pro in 1969
- Shawn Gallagher, White House Director for Nuclear Threat Reduction, MIT graduate, and baseball player for the Texas Rangers,
- Kenny Gattison, NBA player
- James Goodnight, CEO SAS Institute
- Beth Grant, actress
- William D. Halyburton, Jr., U.S. Navy hospital corpsman in World War II, posthumous Medal of Honor recipient
- Ed Hinton, actor known particularly for guest-starring roles on television westerns
- Will Inman, poet
- Sonny Jurgensen, Pro Football Hall of Fame quarterback, played with the Washington Redskins and Philadelphia Eagles
- Clarence Kea, professional basketball player
- Charles P. Murray, Jr., U.S. Army officer in World War II and Medal of Honor recipient
- Mike Nifong, North Carolina district attorney disbarred for misconduct in the Duke lacrosse case
- Trot Nixon, MLB right fielder
- Don Payne, writer and producer for The Simpsons and other television and film projects
- Robert Daniel Potter, U.S. District Judge
- Cecil R. Reynolds, noted psychologist, author, and test developer
- Jay Ross, NFL defensive tackle
- Robert Ruark, author of Something of Value
- Lamar Russ, professional boxer in the middleweight division
- George Edward "Bo" Shepard, former head basketball coach of the North Carolina Tar Heels
- Reggie Shuford, ACLU attorney, left before graduation
- Sonny Siaki, American Samoan professional wrestler
- Clyde Simmons, NFL defensive end
- Ross Tomaselli, professional soccer player
- Ty Walker, professional basketball player
- Blake Walston, professional baseball player in the Arizona Diamondbacks organization
