= Dennis Lamp =

American baseball player (born 1952)

- Pitcher
- Born: September 23, 1952 (age 73); Los Angeles, California, U.S.
- Batted: Right Threw: Right

MLB debut
- August 21, 1977, for the Chicago Cubs

Last MLB appearance
- June 6, 1992, for the Pittsburgh Pirates

MLB statistics
- Win–loss record: 96–96
- Earned run average: 3.93
- Strikeouts: 857
- Stats at Baseball Reference

Teams
- Chicago Cubs (1977–1980); Chicago White Sox (1981–1983); Toronto Blue Jays (1984–1986); Oakland Athletics (1987); Boston Red Sox (1988–1991); Pittsburgh Pirates (1992)

Dennis Patrick Lamp (born September 23, 1952) is an American former professional baseball pitcher in Major League Baseball. From 1977 through 1992, the breaking ball specialist played for the Chicago Cubs, Chicago White Sox, Toronto Blue Jays, Oakland Athletics, Boston Red Sox, and Pittsburgh Pirates.

== Career ==
Lamp was born in Los Angeles, California. After graduating in 1971 from St. John Bosco High School in Bellflower, California, Lamp was selected in the third round (62nd overall) by the Cubs in that year's MLB draft.

Lamp began his career as a Cub, but was traded to the crosstown Chicago White Sox for pitcher Ken Kravec. His seven wins and 15 saves helped the White Sox win their division by a whopping 20 games and reach the ALCS. A month later, he was granted free agency and signed with the Toronto Blue Jays.

In a 14-season career, Lamp posted a 96-96 record with a 3.93 ERA and 35 saves in 639 games pitched. His best season was 1985 when he went 11-0 with a 3.32 ERA in 105 innings pitched. In 1984 with the Blue Jays, Lamp came up just one win short of Luis Arroyo's 1961 record for most consecutive wins by a reliever.

He continued to pitch while approaching his 40th birthday, coming out of the bullpen in 21 games for the 1992 Pittsburgh Pirates, who won their division and advanced to the NLCS, but he was released in June of that season.

Lamp was involved in two individual career milestones involving a pair of future Baseball Hall of Famers. On August 13, 1979, he gave up Lou Brock's 3,000th hit. He also surrendered Cal Ripken Jr.'s first major-league hit, a third-inning infield single in the White Sox's 8–7 victory over the Baltimore Orioles at Memorial Stadium on August 16, 1981.

== Post season appearances ==
Lamp has pitched in the ALCS on three occasions: 1983 with the White Sox, 1985 with the Blue Jays, and 1990 with the Red Sox.

== Life after baseball ==
Lamp has worked behind the seafood counter at Bristol Farms in Newport Beach, California, since 2004.
