= New Hanover County Schools =

School district in North Carolina, United States

Address
- 6410 Carolina Beach Road Wilmington, North Carolina, 28412; United States

District information
- Type: Public
- Motto: "Reach, Equip, Achieve."
- Grades: Pre-K through 12th
- Superintendent: Dr. Christopher Barnes
- Schools: 43
- Budget: 230,735,000 USD
- NCES District ID: 3703330
- District ID: 650

Students and staff
- Students: 26,131
- Teachers: 1,693
- Staff: 1,756
- Student–teacher ratio: 15.43

Other information
- Website: www.nhcs.net

New Hanover County Schools (NHCS) is a school district headquartered in Wilmington, North Carolina, United States. It operates public schools in New Hanover County. It is the 12th-largest school district in North Carolina and is estimated to be the 311th-largest in the United States.

== Schools ==
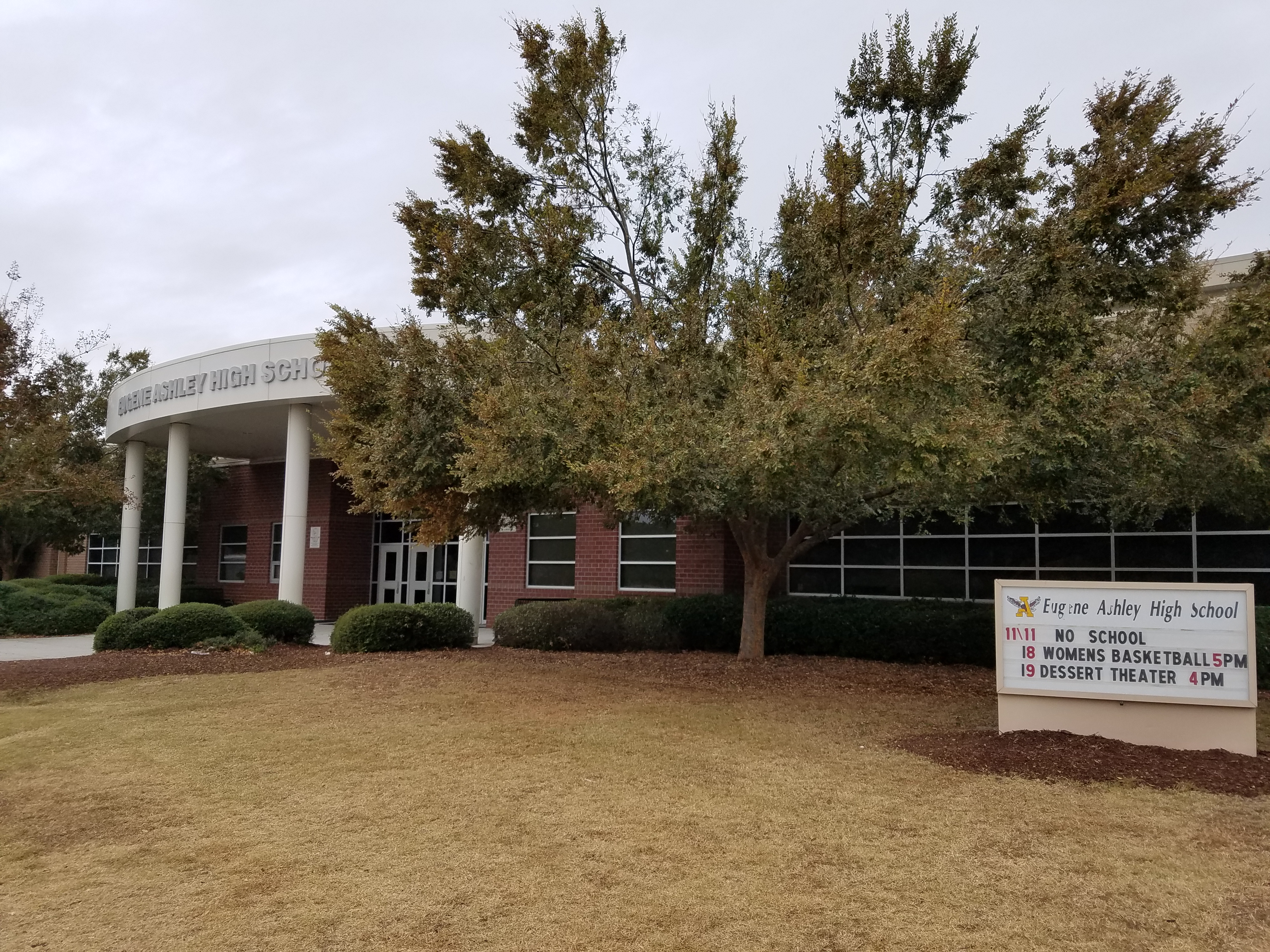
Eugene Ashley High School

=== High schools ===
- Eugene Ashley High School
- Isaac Bear Early College High School
- John T. Hoggard High School
- Emsley A. Laney High School
- Mosley Performance Learning Center
- New Hanover High School
- South Eastern Area Technical High School
- Wilmington Early College High School

=== Middle schools ===
- International School at Gregory
- Lake Forest Academy School
- MCS Noble Middle School
- Murray Middle School
- Myrtle Grove Middle School
- Roland-Grise Middle School
- Holly Shelter Middle School
- Trask Middle School
- Williston Middle School

=== Elementary schools ===
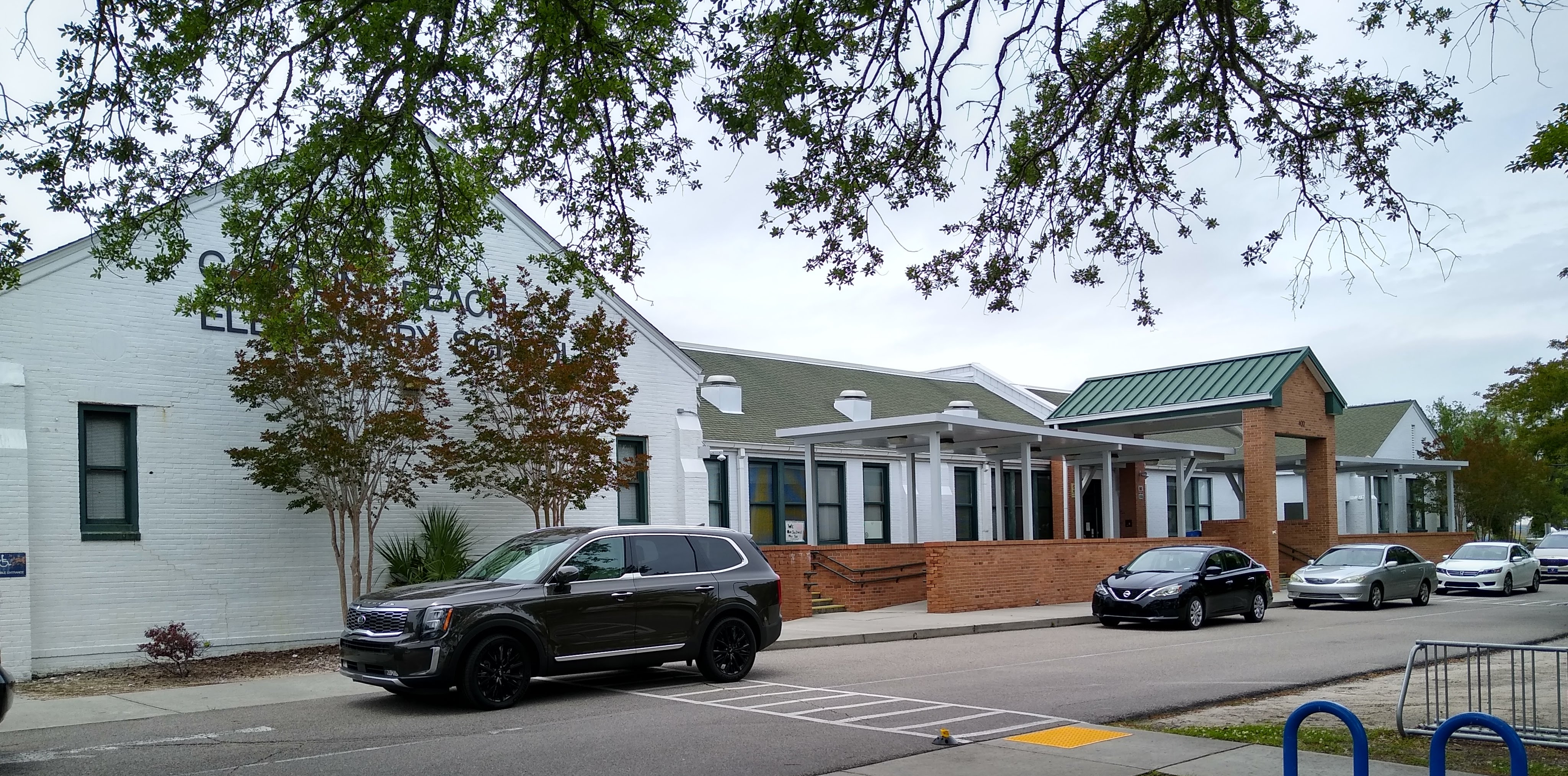
Carolina Beach Elementary School

- Alderman
- Anderson
- Bellamy
- Blair
- Bradley Creek
- Castle Hayne
- Carolina Beach
- Codington
- College Park
- Eaton
- Forest Hills
- Freeman School of Engineering
- Gregory School of Science, Mathematics, and Technology
- Holly Tree
- Lake Forest Academy
- Masonboro School
- Murrayville
- Ogden
- Pine Valley Elementary School
- Porters Neck
- Snipes Academy of Arts and Design
- Sunset Park
- Mary C. Williams
- Winter Park
- Wrightsboro
- Wrightsville Beach
