= John T. Hoggard High School =

American public school in North Carolina

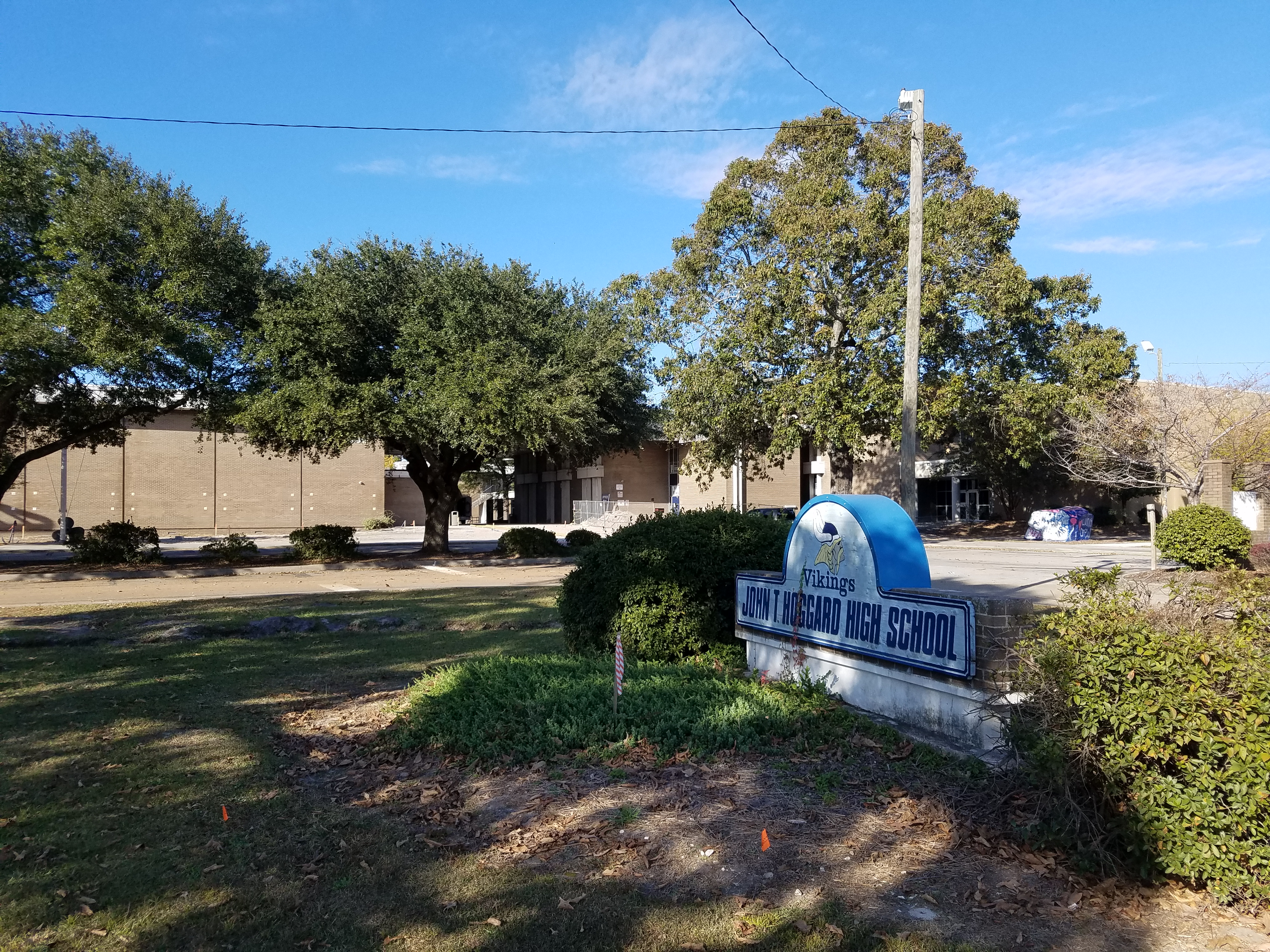
- John T. Hoggard High School, November 2016

Location
- 4305 Shipyard Boulevard; Wilmington, North Carolina 28403; United States; 34°11′59″N 77°53′35″W

Information
- Type: Public
- Founded: 1967 (59 years ago)
- School district: New Hanover County Schools
- Superintendent: Charles Foust
- CEEB code: 344348
- NCES School ID: 370333001379
- Principal: Christopher Madden
- Staff: 112.00 (FTE)
- Grades: 9–12
- Age: 14 to 18
- Enrollment: 2,178 (2023–2024)
- Student to teacher ratio: 19.45
- Language: English
- Colors: Blue and white
- Athletics: NCHSAA 8A
- Athletics conference: Carolina Coast 6A/7A/8A
- Mascot: Vikings
- Feeder schools: Myrtle Grove Middle School, Roland Grise Middle School, Noble Middle School
- Website: hoggard.nhcs.net

John T. Hoggard High School (commonly known as Hoggard High School) is a public high school in the New Hanover County School System in Wilmington, North Carolina.

== History ==
Hoggard High School is named after Dr. John Thomas Hoggard (1876–1965), who had an active career in education, beginning with his election as Chairman of the New Hanover County Board of Education in 1935, and ending with his death in 1965. His private papers are kept in the Manuscript Collection at the University of North Carolina Wilmington.

In June 2026, the school valedictorian said in his speech: "As my biggest inspiration once said, 'Every human being has something of value that they bring to the table.'" He didn't say who the author was but students communicating over text during the ceremony recognized it from a 2022 interview by Alex Jones with Kanye West. At one point, a Jewish student took the mic and attempted to explain that the valedictorian had omitted the words "...especially Hitler," from the end of the quote. Principal Madden refused to give the Jewish student her diploma. A school board member said, "I don't want to assume he was blowing a dog whistle..." The family released a statement attempting to clarify the nature of the statement.

== Athletics ==
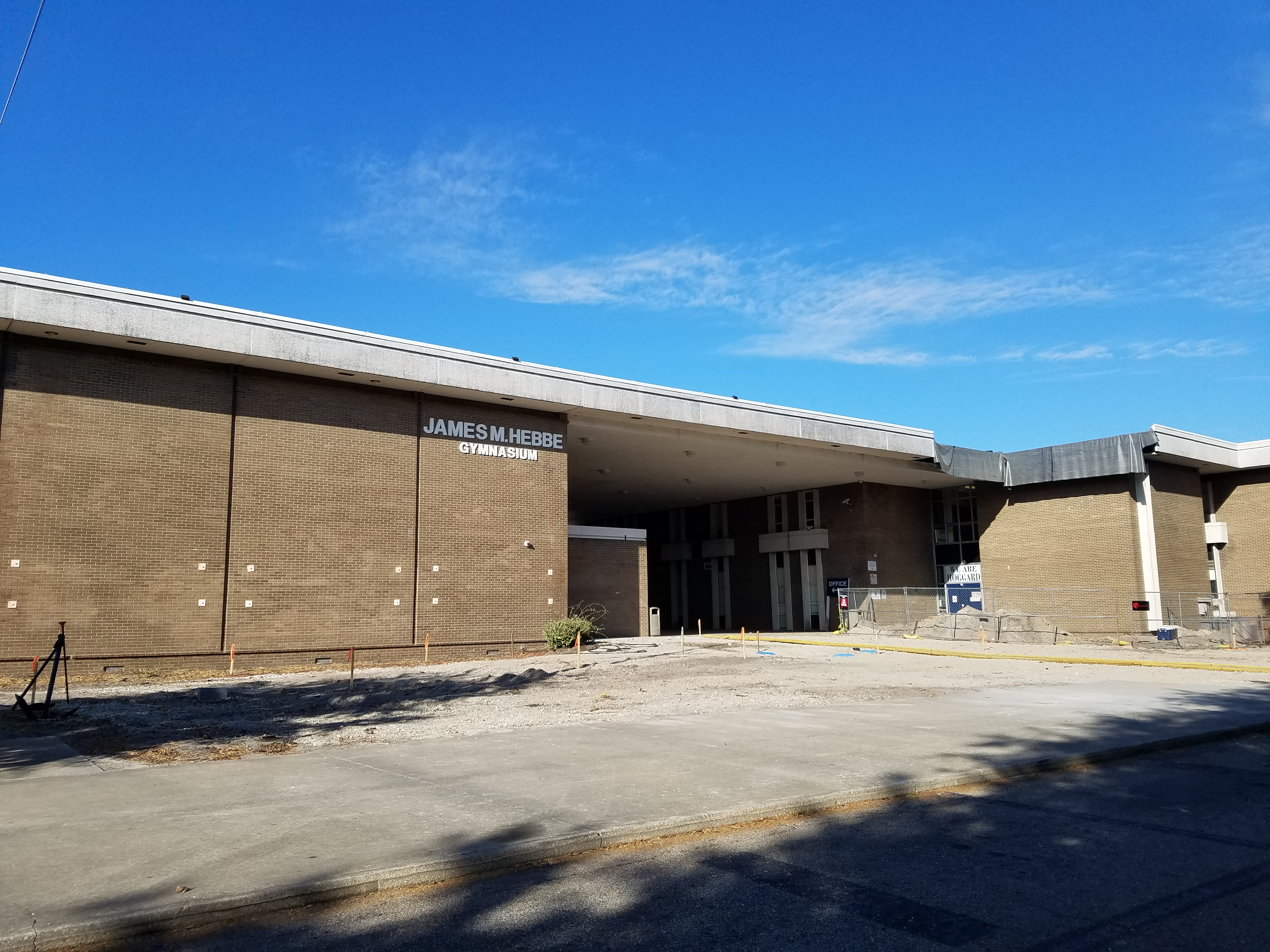
Gym (under renovation in 2016) at the front of Hoggard campus

Hoggard High School fields 25 varsity and junior varsity teams across 13 sports. It is a member of the North Carolina High School Athletic Association (NCHSAA) and is classified as an 8A school. It is a part of the Coastal Carolina 6A/7A/8A Conference. The school mascot is the Viking, and the primary colors are blue and white.

=== Football Team ===
The Hoggard football team won their eighth straight conference championship in 2009. In 2007, the team won the NCHSAA 4A state championship with an undefeated record. Hoggard played the championship game against Mount Tabor and defeated them by a score of 28–0.

== Academics ==
John T. Hoggard High School offers fourteen Advanced Placement courses and a substantial number of honors classes. In its class of 2007, 67% of graduating students went on to four-year colleges, and another 29% went on to two-year colleges. 90% of the class took the SAT, and the average math score was 545, while the average critical reading score was 524.

The school also has arts, music, and Career and Technical Education (CTE) programs that allow students to prepare for post-secondary study or careers in areas of business, health care, architecture, engineering, culinary arts, horticulture.

In 2014, Hoggard ranked 11th in the U.S. News & World Report magazine list of top high schools in North Carolina.

== Arts ==
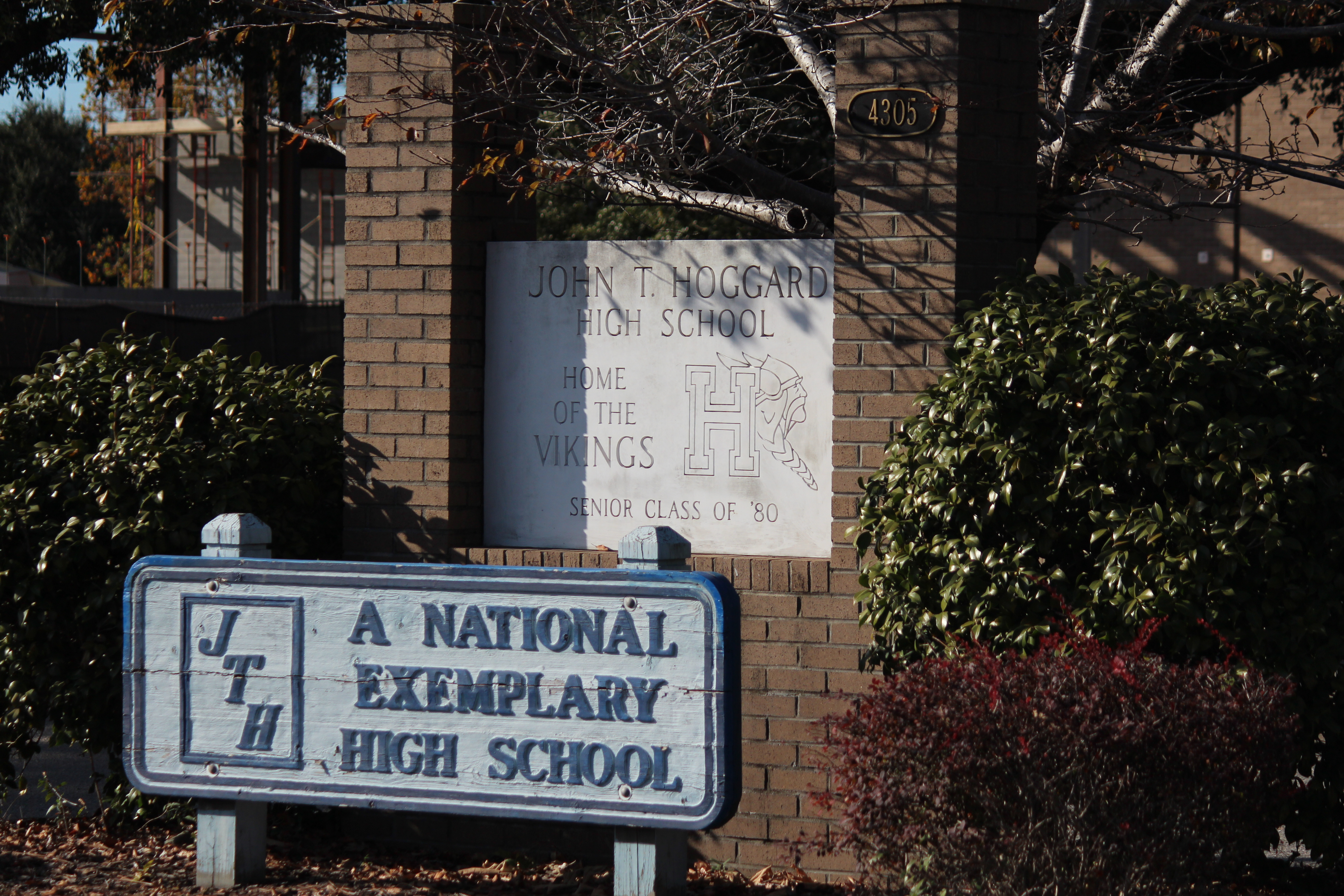
Sign at the main entrance to Hoggard

=== Voyagers ===
The Voyagers are Hoggard's advanced choral ensemble. The Voyagers were established within the first year of Hoggard's existence and participate in numerous events. The original Voyagers class were responsible for the composition of Hoggard's alma mater, to the tune of Eternal Father, Strong to Save.

== Notable people ==
=== Alumni ===
- Connor Barth, former NFL kicker
- Jeanne Milliken Bonds, politician, lobbyist, and professor
- Bob Boyd, professional golfer who played on the PGA Tour
- Derek Brunson, UFC fighter
- Deb Butler, member of the North Carolina House of Representatives
- Jonathan Cooper, former NFL offensive guard
- Kristen Dalton, Miss USA 2009
- Julia Dalton, Miss North Carolina USA 2015
- Christopher Jones, actor and dancer
- Brad Keeney, former NFL defensive tackle
- Kimberly Munley, civilian police officer who helped in stopping the November 2009 shooting at Fort Hood
- Ralph Ronald "Ron" Musselman, MLB pitcher for the Seattle Mariners (1982) and Toronto Blue Jays (1984–1985)
- Bill Saffo, mayor of Wilmington, longest-serving mayor in city history
- Bryan Sammons, MLB pitcher for the Detroit Tigers
- Todd Vasos, CEO of Dollar General

=== Faculty ===
- John Rinka, teaches English; was a college basketball stand–out at Kenyon College from 1966 to 1970, scored over 3,000 career points
