= The Sporting News Manager of the Year Award =

American baseball award

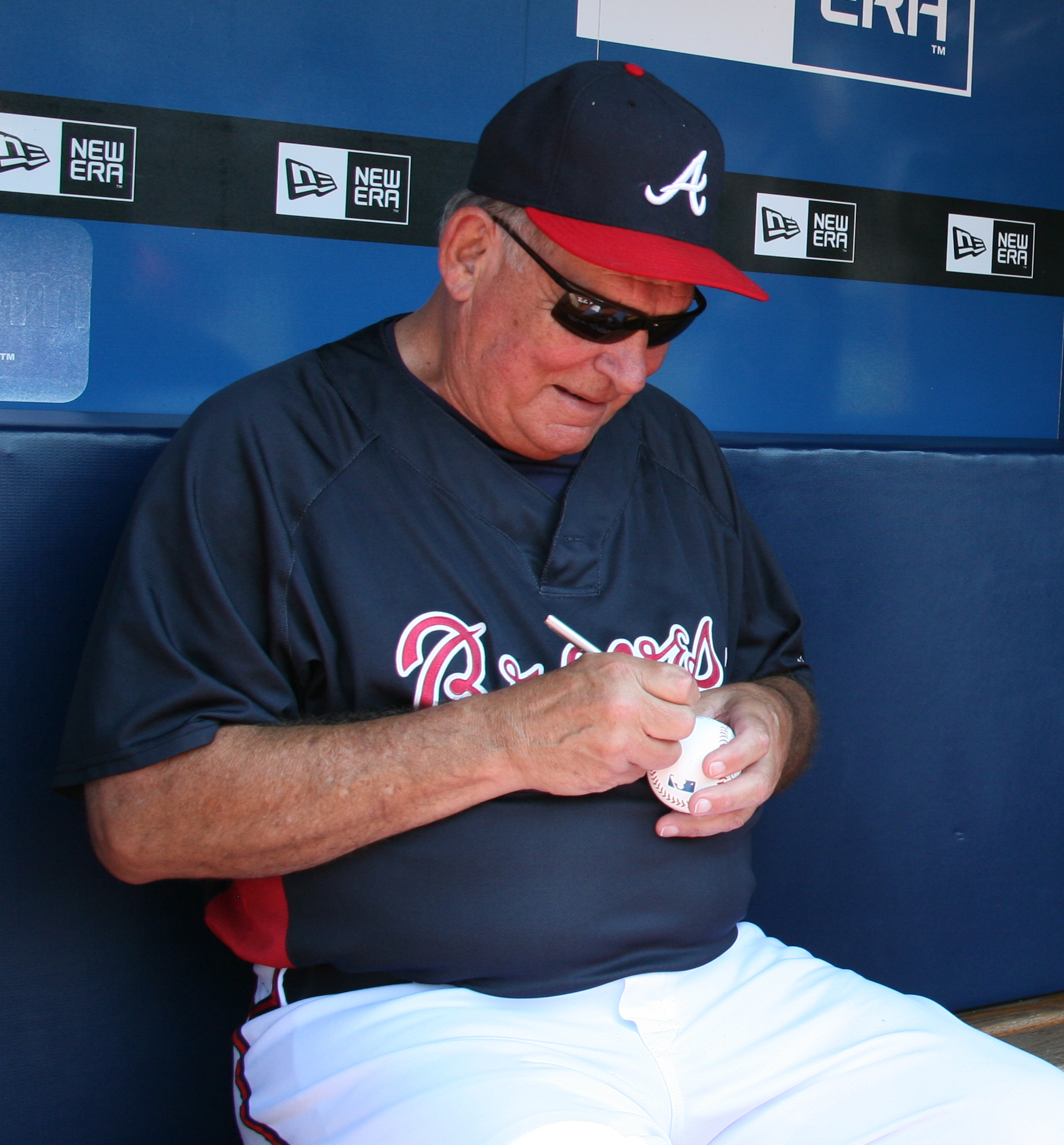
Bobby Cox was awarded The Sporting News Manager of the Year Award a record eight times.

The Sporting News Manager of the Year Award was established in 1936 by The Sporting News (formerly Sporting News from 2002 to 2022) and was given annually to one manager in Major League Baseball. In 1986 it was expanded to honor one manager from each league.

== Winners ==
=== Key ===
| ^{†} | Member of the National Baseball Hall of Fame and Museum |

Listed below in chronological order are the MLB managers chosen as recipients of the TSN Manager of the Year Award.

== 1936–1985 ==
| Year | Winner | Team | League |
|---|---|---|---|
| 1936 | Joe McCarthy (1) | New York Yankees | American League |
| 1937 | Bill McKechnie (1) | Boston Braves | National League |
| 1938 | Joe McCarthy (2) | New York Yankees | American League |
| 1939 | Leo Durocher (1) | Brooklyn Dodgers | National League |
| 1940 | Bill McKechnie (2) | Cincinnati Reds | National League |
| 1941 | Billy Southworth (1) | St. Louis Cardinals | National League |
| 1942 | Billy Southworth (2) | St. Louis Cardinals | National League |
| 1943 | Joe McCarthy (3) | New York Yankees | American League |
| 1944 | Luke Sewell | St. Louis Browns | American League |
| 1945 | Ossie Bluege | Washington Senators | American League |
| 1946 | Eddie Dyer | St. Louis Cardinals | National League |
| 1947 | Bucky Harris | New York Yankees | American League |
| 1948 | Billy Meyer | Pittsburgh Pirates | National League |
| 1949 | Casey Stengel (1) | New York Yankees | American League |
| 1950 | Red Rolfe | Detroit Tigers | American League |
| 1951 | Leo Durocher (2) | New York Giants | National League |
| 1952 | Eddie Stanky | St. Louis Cardinals | National League |
| 1953 | Casey Stengel (2) | New York Yankees | American League |
| 1954 | Leo Durocher (3) | New York Giants | National League |
| 1955 | Walter Alston (1) | Brooklyn Dodgers | National League |
| 1956 | Birdie Tebbetts | Cincinnati Redlegs | National League |
| 1957 | Fred Hutchinson | St. Louis Cardinals | National League |
| 1958 | Casey Stengel (3) | New York Yankees | American League |
| 1959 | Walter Alston (2) | Los Angeles Dodgers | National League |
| 1960 | Danny Murtaugh (1) | Pittsburgh Pirates | National League |
| 1961 | Ralph Houk | New York Yankees | American League |
| 1962 | Bill Rigney | Los Angeles Angels | American League |
| 1963 | Walter Alston (3) | Los Angeles Dodgers | National League |
| 1964 | Johnny Keane | St. Louis Cardinals | National League |
| 1965 | Sam Mele | Minnesota Twins | American League |
| 1966 | Hank Bauer | Baltimore Orioles | American League |
| 1967 | Dick Williams | Boston Red Sox | American League |
| 1968 | Mayo Smith | Detroit Tigers | American League |
| 1969 | Gil Hodges | New York Mets | National League |
| 1970 | Danny Murtaugh (2) | Pittsburgh Pirates | National League |
| 1971 | Charlie Fox | San Francisco Giants | National League |
| 1972 | Chuck Tanner | Chicago White Sox | American League |
| 1973 | Gene Mauch | Montreal Expos | National League |
| 1974 | Bill Virdon (1) | New York Yankees | American League |
| 1975 | Darrell Johnson | Boston Red Sox | American League |
| 1976 | Danny Ozark | Philadelphia Phillies | National League |
| 1977 | Earl Weaver (1) | Baltimore Orioles | American League |
| 1978 | George Bamberger | Milwaukee Brewers | American League |
| 1979 | Earl Weaver (2) | Baltimore Orioles | American League |
| 1980 | Bill Virdon (2) | Houston Astros | National League |
| 1981 | Billy Martin | Oakland Athletics | American League |
| 1982 | Whitey Herzog | St. Louis Cardinals | National League |
| 1983 | Tony La Russa (1) | Chicago White Sox | American League |
| 1984 | Jim Frey | Chicago Cubs | National League |
| 1985 | Bobby Cox (1) | Toronto Blue Jays | American League |

== 1986–present ==
| Year | American League winner | Team | National League winner | Team | Ref |
|---|---|---|---|---|---|
| 1986 | John McNamara | Boston Red Sox | Hal Lanier | Houston Astros | |
| 1987 | Sparky Anderson | Detroit Tigers | Buck Rodgers | Montreal Expos | |
| 1988 | Tony La Russa (2) | Oakland Athletics | Jim Leyland (1) | Pittsburgh Pirates | |
| 1989 | Frank Robinson | Baltimore Orioles | Don Zimmer | Chicago Cubs | |
| 1990 | Jeff Torborg | Chicago White Sox | Jim Leyland (2) | Pittsburgh Pirates | |
| 1991 | Tom Kelly | Minnesota Twins | Bobby Cox (2) | Atlanta Braves | |
| 1992 | Tony La Russa (3) | Oakland Athletics | Jim Leyland (3) | Pittsburgh Pirates | |
| 1993 | Johnny Oates (1) | Baltimore Orioles | Bobby Cox (3) | Atlanta Braves | |
| 1994 | Buck Showalter (1) | New York Yankees | Felipe Alou | Montreal Expos | |
| 1995 | Mike Hargrove | Cleveland Indians | Don Baylor | Colorado Rockies | |
| 1996 | Johnny Oates (2) | Texas Rangers | Bruce Bochy (1) | San Diego Padres | |
| 1997 | Davey Johnson (1) | Baltimore Orioles | Dusty Baker (1) | San Francisco Giants | |
| 1998 | Joe Torre | New York Yankees | Bruce Bochy (2) | San Diego Padres | |
| 1999 | Jimy Williams | Boston Red Sox | Bobby Cox (4) | Atlanta Braves | |
| 2000 | Jerry Manuel | Chicago White Sox | Dusty Baker (2) | San Francisco Giants | |
| 2001 | Lou Piniella | Seattle Mariners | Larry Bowa | Philadelphia Phillies | |
| 2002 | Mike Scioscia (1) | Anaheim Angels | Bobby Cox (5) | Atlanta Braves | |
| 2003 | Tony Peña | Kansas City Royals | Bobby Cox (6) | Atlanta Braves | |
| 2004 | Ron Gardenhire (1); Buck Showalter (2) | Minnesota Twins; Texas Rangers | Bobby Cox (7) | Atlanta Braves | |
| 2005 | Ozzie Guillén | Chicago White Sox | Bobby Cox (8) | Atlanta Braves | |
| 2006 | Jim Leyland (4) | Detroit Tigers | Joe Girardi | Florida Marlins | |
| 2007 | Eric Wedge | Cleveland Indians | Bob Melvin | Arizona Diamondbacks | |
| 2008 | Joe Maddon (1) | Tampa Bay Rays | Fredi González | Florida Marlins | |
| 2009 | Mike Scioscia (2) | Los Angeles Angels | Jim Tracy | Colorado Rockies | |
| 2010 | Ron Gardenhire (2) | Minnesota Twins | Bud Black | San Diego Padres | |
| 2011 | Joe Maddon (2) | Tampa Bay Rays | Kirk Gibson | Arizona Diamondbacks | |
| 2012 | Buck Showalter (3) | Baltimore Orioles | Davey Johnson (2) | Washington Nationals | |
| 2013 | John Farrell | Boston Red Sox | Clint Hurdle | Pittsburgh Pirates | |
| 2014 | Mike Scioscia (3) | Los Angeles Angels | Matt Williams | Washington Nationals | |
| 2015 | Paul Molitor | Minnesota Twins | Terry Collins | New York Mets | |
| 2016 | Terry Francona | Cleveland Indians | Dave Roberts | Los Angeles Dodgers | |
| 2017 | Terry Francona (2) | Cleveland Indians | Craig Counsell (1) | Milwaukee Brewers | |
| 2018 | Bob Melvin | Oakland Athletics | Craig Counsell (2); Brian Snitker (1) | Milwaukee Brewers; Atlanta Braves | |
| 2019 | Kevin Cash | Tampa Bay Rays | Brian Snitker (2) | Atlanta Braves | |
| 2020 | Kevin Cash (2) | Tampa Bay Rays | Don Mattingly | Miami Marlins | |
| 2021 | Kevin Cash (3) | Tampa Bay Rays | Gabe Kapler | San Francisco Giants | |
| 2022 | Brandon Hyde (1) | Baltimore Orioles | Buck Showalter (4) | New York Mets | |
| 2023 | Brandon Hyde (2) | Baltimore Orioles | Craig Counsell (3); Brian Snitker (3) | Milwaukee Brewers; Atlanta Braves | |
| 2024 | Stephen Vogt | Cleveland Guardians | Pat Murphy | Milwaukee Brewers | |
| 2025 | Dan Wilson | Seattle Mariners | Pat Murphy (2) | Milwaukee Brewers | |
| 2026 | Will Venable | Chicago White Sox | Pat Murphy (3) | Milwaukee Brewers | |

== Sources ==
- Baseball Almanac – TSN Manager of the Year Award

== See also ==
- Major League Baseball Manager of the Year Award
- MLB This Year in Baseball Awards Manager of the Year
- Baseball America Manager of the Year
- Baseball Prospectus Internet Baseball Awards Manager of the Year
- Chuck Tanner Major League Baseball Manager of the Year Award
- Associated Press Manager of the Year (discontinued in 2001)
- Sporting News Manager of the Decade (2009)
- Sports Illustrated MLB Manager of the Decade (2009)
- MLB All-Time Manager (1997; BBWAA)
- MLB all-time managerial wins
- Baseball awards § United States
- List of MLB awards
- Other The Sporting News major-league baseball awards
