= Jim Leyland =

American baseball manager (born 1944)

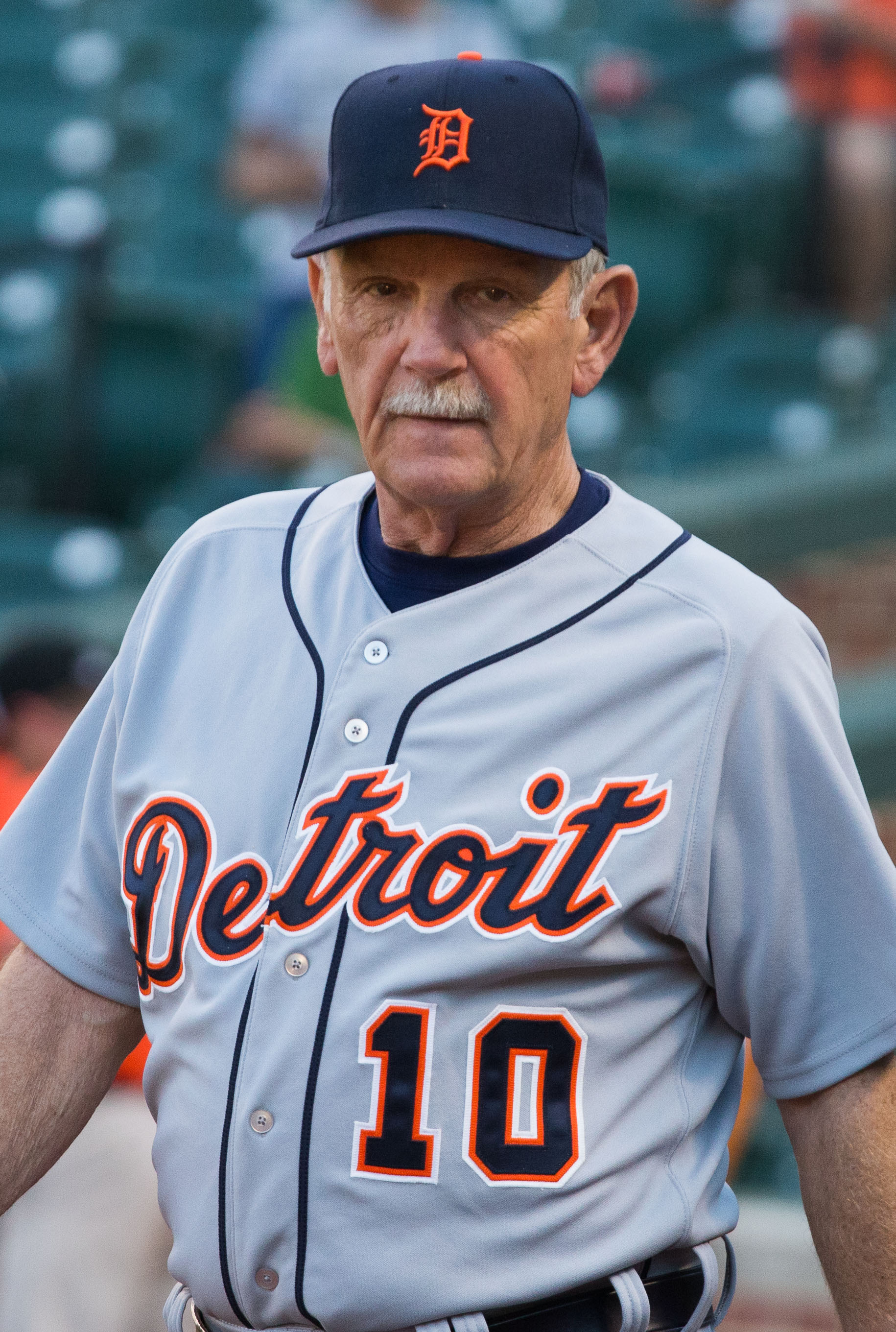
- Leyland with the Detroit Tigers in 2013
- Manager
- Born: December 15, 1944 (age 81); Perrysburg, Ohio, U.S.
- Bats: Right Throws: Right

MLB statistics
- Games managed: 3,499
- Managerial record: 1,769–1,728–2
- Winning %: .506
- Managerial record at Baseball Reference

Teams
- As manager: Pittsburgh Pirates (1986–1996); Florida Marlins (1997–1998); Colorado Rockies (1999); Detroit Tigers (2006–2013); As coach: Chicago White Sox (1982–1985)

Career highlights and awards
- World Series champion (1997); 3× Manager of the Year (1990, 1992, 2006); Detroit Tigers No. 10 retired; Pittsburgh Pirates Hall of Fame; Marlins Legends Hall of Fame

Member of the National

Baseball Hall of Fame
- Induction: 2024
- Vote: 93.8%
- Election method: Contemporary Baseball Era Committee
Medals
Men's baseball
Manager for United States
World Baseball Classic
Gold medal – first place	2017 Los Angeles	Team

James Richard Leyland (born December 15, 1944) is an American former professional baseball player, coach and manager. He serves as a special assistant to the Detroit Tigers of Major League Baseball (MLB).

Leyland led the Florida Marlins to the 1997 World Series championship over the Cleveland Indians, and previously won three straight division titles (1990, 1991, and 1992) with the Pittsburgh Pirates. He is one of eleven managers to lead three different teams to the postseason. With the Tigers' victory in the 2006 American League Championship Series, Leyland became the seventh manager in history to win pennants in both the National and American Leagues.

Leyland is a three-time Manager of the Year Award winner, twice in the National League (1990 and 1992), and once in the American League (2006). He managed the United States national team at the 2017 World Baseball Classic, leading the team to its first gold medal finish. On December 3, 2023, Leyland was elected to the National Baseball Hall of Fame.

== Early life ==
James Richard Leyland was born on December 15, 1944, in Perrysburg, Ohio. His father worked in a glass factory and his mother was a stay-at-home mother of seven children. Leyland's first baseball team was part of a Knights of Columbus league. Leyland graduated from Perrysburg High School in Perrysburg, Ohio, in 1962, where he excelled in baseball.

== Professional career ==
=== Minor leagues ===
Leyland began his baseball career with the Detroit Tigers when they signed him as a catcher on September 21, 1963. He spent seven seasons as a minor leaguer in the Tigers organization (1964–1970), but mainly served as a coach with the Montgomery Rebels in 1970 while playing in just two games for the team. Leyland was a career .222 hitter in the minor leagues.

== Coaching career ==
Leyland left the Tigers organization for the first time in 1982 when he became Tony La Russa's third base coach for four seasons (1982–85) with the Chicago White Sox, including the team's 1983 AL West division title.

== Managerial career ==
=== Minor leagues ===
In 1972, Leyland became a minor league manager in the Tigers organization; beginning with the Clinton Pilots of the Midwest League; from 1979 to 1981, he was the manager of the Evansville Triplets winning two divisions (1979, 1981) in the American Association.

=== Pittsburgh Pirates (1986–1996) ===
1986 promotional photo for Leyland of the Pittsburgh Pirates

On November 20, 1985, Leyland was named as the 33rd manager in Pittsburgh Pirates franchise history, managing the team from 1986 to 1996 where he won two Manager of the Year trophies in 1990 and 1992, and finished as runner-up in 1988 and 1991. Leyland helped develop such All-Stars as Barry Bonds, Jay Bell, Tim Wakefield, Andy Van Slyke and Bobby Bonilla in Pittsburgh before a fire sale in the mid-1990s soured him with new ownership. Under Leyland, the Pirates won the National League Eastern Division title and went to the National League Championship Series in three straight seasons (1990, 1991, and 1992). Pittsburgh averaged 96 regular season victories over those three years, although lost all three times in the NLCS with the later two going the full seven games against the Atlanta Braves. The Pirates lost to the Cincinnati Reds (four games to two) in the 1990 NLCS.

Leyland left after 11 seasons spent with the Pirates in order to manage a contender despite a contract which ran to 2000 with a salary of $1 million, stating it was not a tough decision but a sad one, noting his dissatisfaction with owner Kevin McClatchy on trades and salary cutting.

One member of Leyland's coaching staff while with the Pirates, Terry Collins, who was most recently the manager of the New York Mets, wore number 10 to honor Leyland.

=== Florida Marlins (1997–1998) ===
In 1997, Leyland was hired by Wayne Huizenga to manage the Florida Marlins and promptly led them to the franchise's first World Championship that year, defeating the Cleveland Indians, four games to three. The Marlins, in only their fifth year of existence, became the fastest expansion franchise to win a World Series. The Arizona Diamondbacks surpassed the Marlins when they won the World Series in 2001, their fourth season.

In the offseason, Huizenga dismantled the team in a fire sale. After Game 7, when asked about rumors that he might retire if Huizenga sold the franchise, Leyland quipped, "My wife doesn't like me that much. I can't retire." Leyland remained as the manager, but resigned after the 1998 season, when the Marlins went 54–108. Due to the details of his contract (alongside the team finding itself in the process of being sold), he received a $500,000 buyout for the remaining three years of his five-year contract.

=== Colorado Rockies (1999) ===
Leyland was subsequently hired by the Colorado Rockies for the 1999 season. Leyland reached 1,000 wins on April 15, leading the Rockies to a 6–4 win over the San Diego Padres at Coors Field. He achieved the feat in his 2,048th game as manager. Leyland ultimately came to regret the decision to manage in Colorado, saying that while he was treated well by the team, he felt he could not manage well with Coors Field in regard to pitching, as he described himself as "pitcher's manager." He walked away from the final two years of his contract after one season. It was the fifth time in Leyland's 14 seasons that he skippered a team that finished last in its division. After this, he became a Pittsburgh-based scout for the St. Louis Cardinals.

=== Detroit Tigers (2006–2013) ===
Following the release of Alan Trammell as the manager of the Tigers, Leyland was hired as new Tigers manager, returning to the franchise with which he spent the first 18 years of his professional baseball career. It marked the first time Leyland managed in the American League.

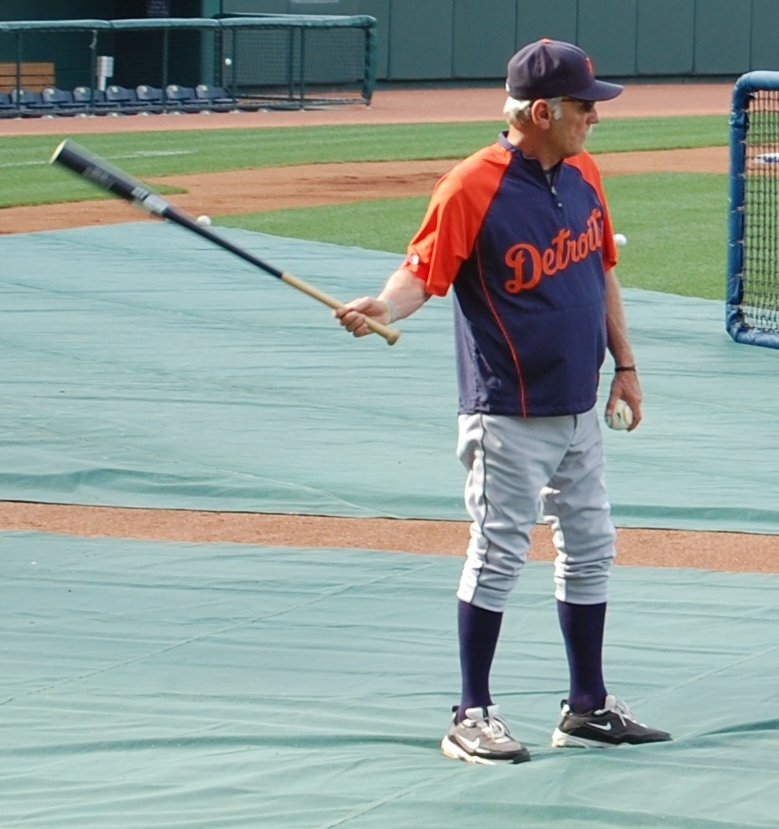
Leyland in 2010

In the 2006 regular season, Leyland guided the Tigers to a 95–67 record, the Tigers' best season since 1987. The Tigers entered the playoffs as a wild card, and went on to defeat the New York Yankees and sweep the Oakland Athletics to win the American League pennant before falling to the St. Louis Cardinals in the 2006 World Series. In leading the team to the AL pennant, he became the seventh manager to win pennants in both major leagues, joining Joe McCarthy, Yogi Berra, Alvin Dark, Sparky Anderson, Dick Williams, and Tony La Russa. After the 2006 season ended, Leyland was recognized with the Manager of the Year award for the third time in his career. He became the third person to win the award in both leagues, joining La Russa and Bobby Cox. Leyland also won the Sporting News Manager of the Year Award for the American League in 2006.

The Tigers had heightened expectations after the pennant, but they muddled through the next four seasons, which included a last place finish in 2008 (the sixth and last time Leyland had skippered a last place team). Leyland would reach 1,500 wins on April 15, 2011, with a win over the Oakland Athletics, becoming the 19th manager to do so. That year, he would lead the Tigers to another 95–67 regular season record (an improvement of 14 wins), winning the American League Central Division. They went on to defeat the New York Yankees in the American League Division Series before losing to the Texas Rangers in the American League Championship Series.

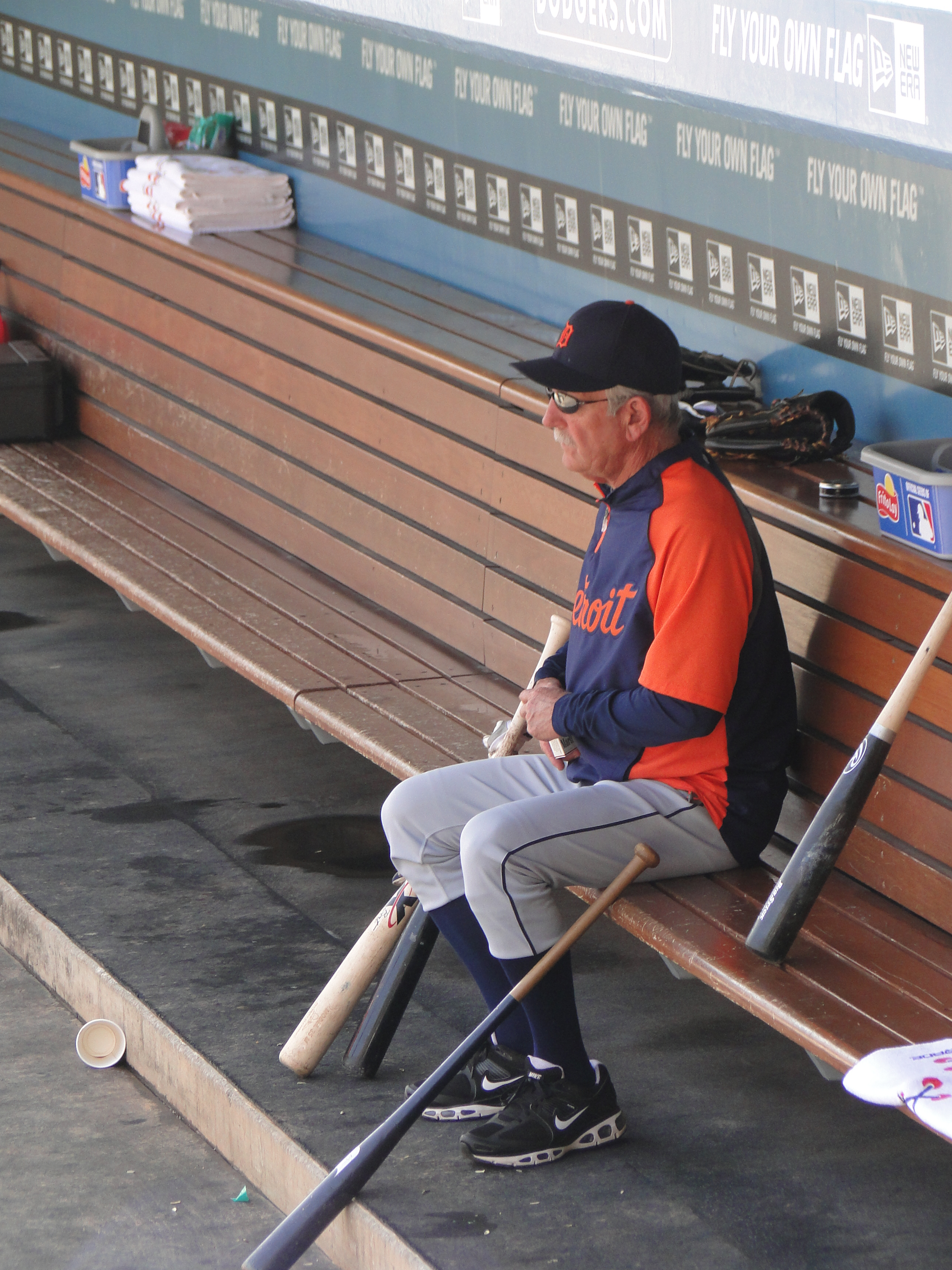
Leyland in 2011

On May 1, 2012, Leyland gained his 1,600th victory as a major league manager, passing Tommy Lasorda on the all-time wins list. In 2012, Leyland led the Tigers to an 88–74 regular season record, winning the American League Central Division. On that team, Tigers third baseman Miguel Cabrera was the American League Triple Crown winner that season. This was the first Triple Crown winner in Major League Baseball since Carl Yastrzemski in 1967. When the Tigers won the AL Central for the second consecutive season, Leyland became the only Tigers manager besides Hughie Jennings to lead Detroit to the postseason three times.

In the 2012 postseason, Detroit defeated the Athletics in a five-game ALDS and returned to the World Series following a sweep of the New York Yankees in the American League Championship Series. Detroit was swept in the 2012 World Series by the San Francisco Giants. They were shut out twice, the same number as in the entire 162-game regular season, and had a team batting average of .159.

On September 25, 2013, Leyland won his 700th game with the Tigers. With the 1–0 victory over the Minnesota Twins, the Tigers clinched their third consecutive American League Central Division title. Leyland joined former coach Tony La Russa as the only managers who have led two different MLB franchises to three consecutive division titles. Of the eleven managers to have won three pennants, seven did so in the divisional era, and Leyland has the second most playoff appearances to have won three pennants with eight, with only Terry Francona having more appearances. His 44 postseason wins are tied for fourth most in MLB history with Bruce Bochy, while his 40 losses are fourth most. He retired from managing following the 2013 season, remaining with the Tigers organization as a special assistant. He was replaced by Brad Ausmus.

=== Team USA ===
On April 15, 2016, Leyland was named the manager of Team USA at the 2017 World Baseball Classic. The United States won the 2017 tournament under his leadership, making Leyland the only manager to win a World Series and a WBC title.

== Honors ==
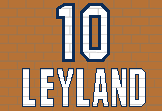
Jim Leyland's number 10 was retired by the Detroit Tigers in 2024.

On May 30, 2017, Leyland was one of eight new inductees announced for the Michigan Sports Hall of Fame in Detroit. The ceremony took place on September 15, 2017.

On December 3, 2023, Leyland was elected to the National Baseball Hall of Fame Class of 2024, and was enshrined on July 21, 2024. He was subsequently selected to the Pittsburgh Pirates Hall of Fame in May 2024.

Leyland's number 10 was retired by the Tigers on August 3, 2024.

== Managerial record ==
Team	Year	Regular season					Postseason			
Team	Year	Games	Won	Lost	Win %	Finish	Won	Lost	Win %	Result
PIT	1986	162	64	98	.395	6th in NL East	–	–	–	
PIT	1987	162	80	82	.494	4th in NL East	–	–	–	
PIT	1988	160	85	75	.531	2nd in NL East	–	–	–	
PIT	1989	162	74	88	.457	5th in NL East	–	–	–	
PIT	1990	162	95	67	.586	1st in NL East	2	4	.333	Lost NLCS (CIN)
PIT	1991	162	98	64	.605	1st in NL East	3	4	.429	Lost NLCS (ATL)
PIT	1992	162	96	66	.593	1st in NL East	3	4	.429	Lost NLCS (ATL)
PIT	1993	162	75	87	.463	5th in NL East	–	–	–	
PIT	1994	114	53	61	.465	3rd in NL Central	–	–	–	
PIT	1995	144	58	86	.403	5th in NL Central	–	–	–	
PIT	1996	162	73	89	.451	5th in NL Central	–	–	–	
PIT total		1714	851	863	.496		8	12	.400	
FLA	1997	162	92	70	.568	2nd in NL East	11	5	.688	Won World Series (CLE)
FLA	1998	162	54	108	.333	5th in NL East	–	–	–	
FLA total		324	146	178	.451		11	5	.688	
COL	1999	162	72	90	.444	5th in NL West	–	–	–	
COL total		162	72	90	.444		0	0	–	
DET	2006	162	95	67	.586	2nd in AL Central	8	5	.615	Lost World Series (STL)
DET	2007	162	88	74	.543	2nd in AL Central	–	–	–	
DET	2008	162	74	88	.457	5th in AL Central	–	–	–	
DET	2009	163	86	77	.528	2nd in AL Central	–	–	–	
DET	2010	162	81	81	.500	3rd in AL Central	–	–	–	
DET	2011	162	95	67	.586	1st in AL Central	5	6	.455	Lost ALCS (TEX)
DET	2012	162	88	74	.543	1st in AL Central	7	6	.538	Lost World Series (SF)
DET	2013	162	93	69	.574	1st in AL Central	5	6	.455	Lost ALCS (BOS)
DET total		1297	700	597	.540		25	23	.521	
Total		3497	1769	1728	.506		44	40	.524	

== Personal life ==
Leyland still keeps his home in the Pittsburgh suburb of Thornburg, Pennsylvania, where he has raised two children, Patrick and Kellie with his wife Katie. His son, Pat, a catcher/first baseman, was drafted by the Tigers in 2010 and also played in the Seattle Mariners and Baltimore Orioles organizations through 2015.

Leyland is a practicing Catholic. His brother Tom Leyland was a priest of the Roman Catholic Diocese of Toledo for 55 years until his death in 2020, and two of his aunts were Ursuline nuns.

== See also ==
- List of Major League Baseball managerial wins and winning percentage leaders
- List of Major League Baseball managers with most career ejections
