= Bob Melvin =

American baseball player and manager (born 1961)

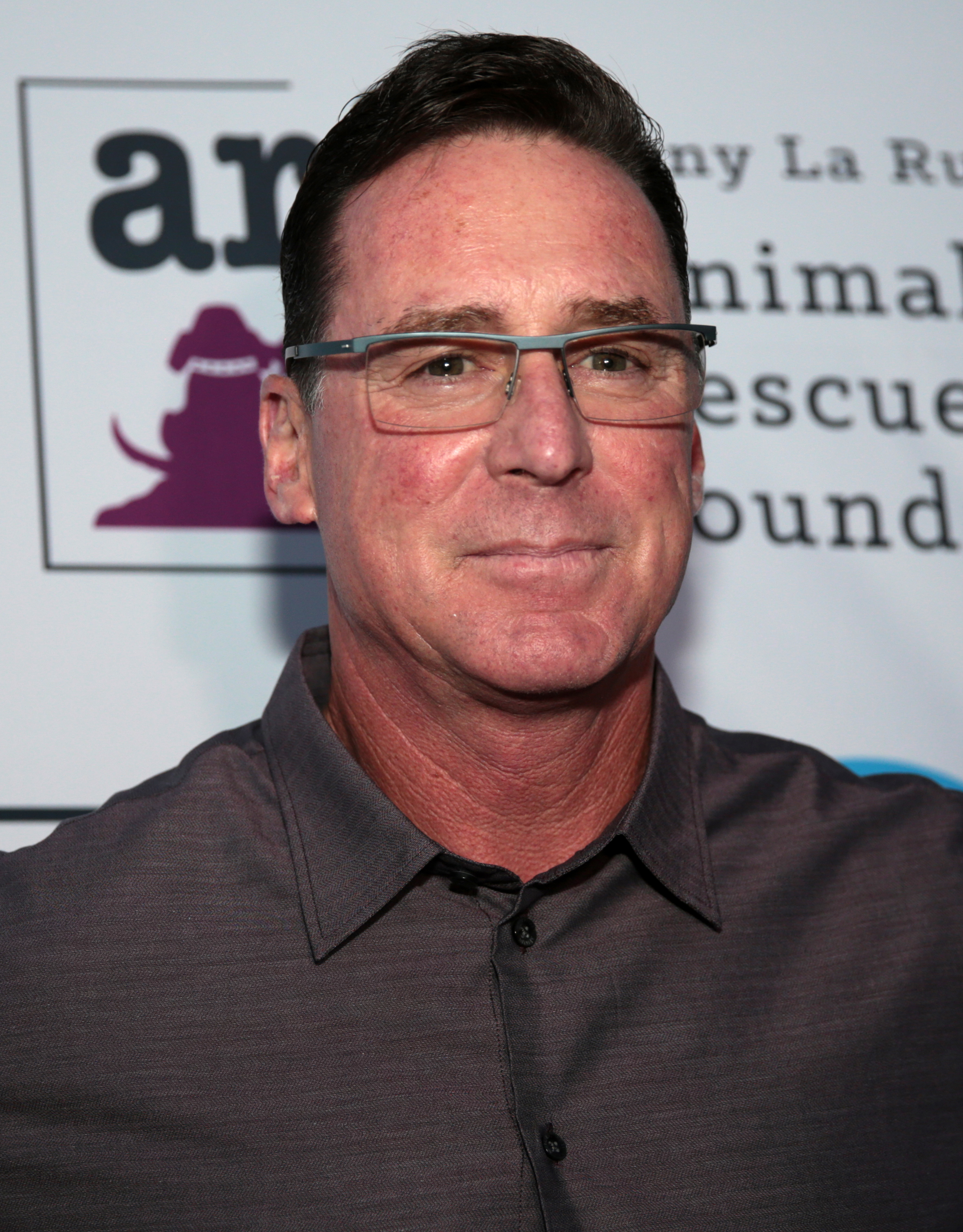
- Melvin in 2017
- Catcher / Manager
- Born: October 28, 1961 (age 65); Palo Alto, California, U.S.
- Batted: Right Threw: Right

MLB debut
- May 25, 1985, for the Detroit Tigers

Last MLB appearance
- August 6, 1994, for the Chicago White Sox

MLB statistics
- Batting average: .233
- Home runs: 35
- Runs batted in: 212
- Managerial record: 1,678–1,588
- Winning %: .514
- Stats at Baseball Reference
- Managerial record at Baseball Reference

Teams
- As player: Detroit Tigers (1985); San Francisco Giants (1986–1988); Baltimore Orioles (1989–1991); Kansas City Royals (1992); Boston Red Sox (1993); New York Yankees (1994); Chicago White Sox (1994); As manager: Seattle Mariners (2003–2004); Arizona Diamondbacks (2005–2009); Oakland Athletics (2011–2021); San Diego Padres (2022–2023); San Francisco Giants (2024–2025); As coach: Milwaukee Brewers (1999); Detroit Tigers (2000); Arizona Diamondbacks (2001–2002)

Career highlights and awards
- 3× Manager of the Year (2007, 2012, 2018); World Series champion (2001)

Robert Paul Melvin (born October 28, 1961) is an American professional baseball manager and former catcher. Melvin has been named Major League Baseball's (MLB) Manager of the Year three times.

Selected in the first round, second overall, by the Detroit Tigers in the secondary phase of the 1981 draft, Melvin was a catcher for the Detroit Tigers, San Francisco Giants, Baltimore Orioles, Kansas City Royals, Boston Red Sox, New York Yankees, and Chicago White Sox during a 10-year playing career from 1985 through 1994.

In his 21-year managing career Melvin has led the Seattle Mariners (2003–04), Arizona Diamondbacks (2005–09), Oakland Athletics (2011–21), San Diego Padres (2022–23), and San Francisco Giants (2024–2025). Melvin was named the National League Manager of the Year in 2007, and the American League Manager of the Year in both 2012 (becoming the sixth manager in history to win the award in both leagues) and in 2018 (becoming the eighth manager ever to win the award at least three times).

Entering the 2020 MLB season, Melvin was the longest-tenured manager in MLB with the same team. Through 2023, his 853 Oakland wins were second-most in team history (behind Connie Mack). He had an aggregate career record of 1,678–1,588 (.514) in 21 seasons as a Major League manager and led his clubs to eight postseason appearances and four division titles; he has made the League Championship Series twice, losing each time.

== Early life ==
Robert Paul Melvin was born on October 28, 1961, in Palo Alto, California, to Paul and Judy (Levitas) Melvin, and grew up in Menlo Park, California. The son of a Jewish mother (who raised him after his parents divorced in 1972) and a Catholic father. He would later recall celebrating Passover with his mother's family. He was raised as a Christian.

Melvin's maternal grandfather, R.B. "Bud" Levitas, was the original ballboy in the 1920s for the Acme Packers (precursor to the Green Bay Packers), and later married Melvin's maternal grandmother, Leah Levitas, who died in 2007.

After attending Laurel and Encinal elementary schools in Menlo Park, Melvin played baseball (at catcher), basketball (at forward), and golf at Menlo-Atherton High School in Atherton, south of San Francisco, graduating in 1979. He batted .474 with 11 home runs for the baseball team, including .529 his senior year when he was named to the San Jose Mercury News' All-Central Coast Section baseball team. He was the first student inducted into the school's Hall of Fame.

== College career ==
Melvin then enrolled at the University of California, Berkeley, and played catcher for the Golden Bears. As a freshman, he helped lead Cal to a 44–23–1 (.654) record and a third-place finish at the College World Series in 1980. Melvin finished his freshman season batting .269 with two doubles and 12 RBIs in 67 at bats over 29 games.

Following his freshman year at California, Melvin transferred to Cañada College in Redwood City, California. He played fall ball for the baseball team.

== Professional career ==
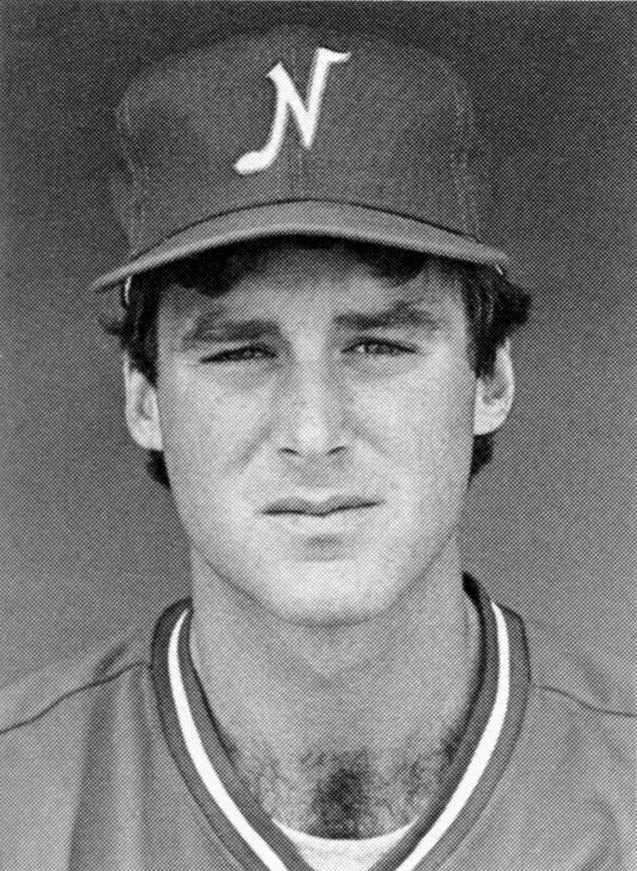
Melvin with the Nashville Sounds in 1985

Melvin was selected in the 1st round (2nd pick) by the Detroit Tigers in the secondary phase of the 1981 draft. He debuted in the major leagues on May 25, 1985, at the age of 23. He played 11 seasons, mostly as a back-up catcher, for the Tigers, San Francisco Giants, Baltimore Orioles, Kansas City Royals, Boston Red Sox, New York Yankees, and Chicago White Sox. As a Tiger, he backed up Lance Parrish, and as a Giant, he served as the backup for fellow catcher Bob Brenly, who, like him, went on to manage the Diamondbacks. During his winters in San Francisco, he interned at Bear Stearns.

In 1987, he caught stealing 42.9% of attempted base-stealers, second-best in the National League. In 1991, Melvin turned five double plays at catcher, fifth-most in the American League, despite playing in only 79 games. Melvin finished his career with a batting average of .233, and 35 home runs.

== Coaching and scouting career ==
Melvin worked for Milwaukee as a scout in 1996, roving instructor in 1997, and assistant to General Manager Sal Bando in 1998. He began his coaching career as Manager Phil Garner's bench coach from 1999 to 2000, first with the Brewers in 1999 wearing #12 (during which time he also managed the Maryvale team in the Arizona Fall League), and then in 2000 with the Tigers, wearing #15. He was inducted into the AFL Hall of Fame in 2013. Melvin then served the Arizona Diamondbacks as bench coach on the staff of manager Bob Brenly, from 2001 to 2002, a period in which the team won two NL West titles, as well as the 2001 World Series.

On February 19, 2026, the Athletics hired Melvin to serve as a special assistant within the organization's baseball operations department.

== Managerial career ==
=== Seattle Mariners (2003–2004) ===
Melvin managed the Seattle Mariners in 2003 and 2004, following a ten-year run of Lou Piniella. The Mariners won 93 games with a .574 win–loss percentage in 2003, as the 93 wins tied Melvin for the 15th-most by any rookie manager in Major League history. However, the team missed the playoffs, finishing three games behind the Oakland Athletics in the division, and two behind the Boston Red Sox for the one wild card spot.

The following season was less successful, as the Mariners lost 99 games in 2004, and Melvin's contract was not extended. He finished with a 156–168 career record (.481) as Mariners manager. He returned to the Diamondbacks for whom he previously had been bench coach before being hired by the Mariners.

=== Arizona Diamondbacks (2005–2009) ===
Melvin was the second manager the Diamondbacks hired for 2005, after they fired Wally Backman before he managed a single game due to revelations of his past arrests and serious financial troubles. Melvin led the team on a 26-game improvement from a franchise-worst 51–111 mark in 2004, as the team finished 2005 with a record of 77–85.

Melvin led Arizona to a National League West title in 2007 with a record of 90–72, and a .556 win–loss percentage. The Diamondbacks entered the playoffs as the No. 1 seed in the National League. They swept the Chicago Cubs in the NLDS, but then were swept themselves in the NLCS by the Colorado Rockies.

Melvin was named National League Sporting News Manager of the Year and MLB Manager of the Year for 2007. His nickname was "The Mad Scientist", because of his mental approach to the game.

On August 14, 2008, with his 304th win Melvin became the winningest manager in Arizona history, passing Bob Brenly.

==== Firing, scout, and job interviews ====
Melvin was fired as manager and replaced by A. J. Hinch, another former catcher, after the May 8, 2009, game. Melvin finished with a 337–340 regular season record as Diamondbacks manager, and a 3–4 post–season record.

Following the 2009 season, Melvin was a candidate to be the next manager of the Houston Astros. However, the position was filled by Brad Mills. He was interviewed by the Milwaukee Brewers for their managerial opening in October 2010, and was believed to be a finalist along with Bobby Valentine, Joey Cora, and Ron Roenicke. The position eventually went to Roenicke, then the Angels' bench coach.

In 2010, Melvin was a scout for the New York Mets, and in May 2011 he worked for the Diamondbacks as a special baseball advisor to president and CEO Derrick Hall.

=== Oakland Athletics (2011–2021) ===
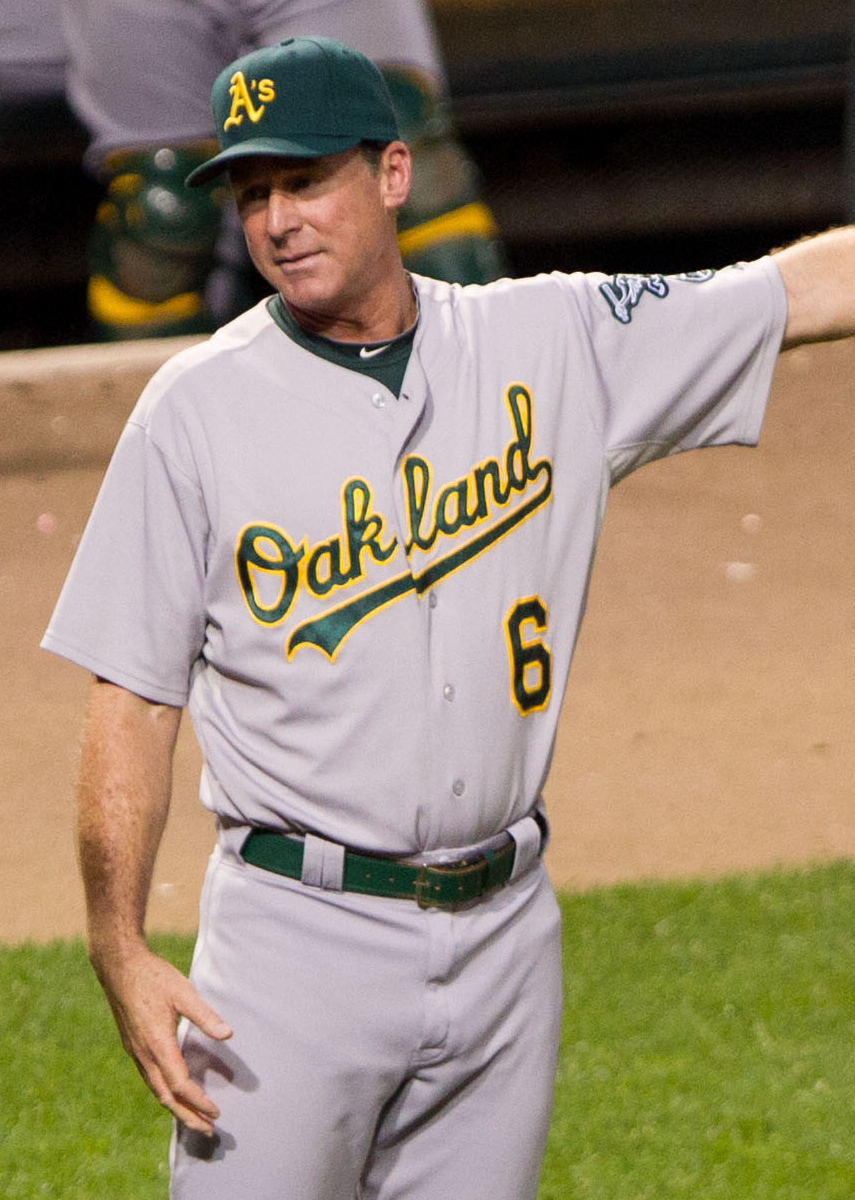
Melvin with the Oakland Athletics

On June 9, 2011, Melvin was named interim manager of the Oakland Athletics following Bob Geren's dismissal. Melvin wore #6 after becoming manager. On September 21, he was given the managerial position on a permanent basis, with a three-year contract extension, and became the 30th manager in franchise history, and the 18th in Oakland history. The Athletics fashioned a 47–52 record under Melvin's watch, and a 74–88 overall finish to 2011. In 2011, he had the lowest rate of his pitchers issuing intentional walks per game of all AL managers, at 0.2%.

Melvin went on the Chris Townsend Show in the Bay Area after the first game of the 2012 season in Tokyo, and promised the fans that the Athletics would work hard every game. He managed the Athletics to the franchise's best-ever record in July at 19–5. On October 1, the Athletics clinched their first playoff appearance since 2006, and two days later clinched the American League West. For the regular season, the team was 94–68, a .580 win–loss percentage. In 2012, he used the fewest pinch runners per game of all AL managers, at 0.10. The Athletics faced the Detroit Tigers in the Division Series. They lost the first two games in close fashion before going back to Oakland and winning tight affairs in Game 3 and 4 to force a pivotal Game 5 in Oakland. They were then shut out 6–0 to finish the series. Melvin was honored as the 2012 American League Manager of the Year. He became the 14th manager in history to win the award at least twice in a career, and the sixth manager to win the award in both leagues.

During the 2013 season, Melvin's second full season at the helm, the Athletics continued what began the previous year, posting winning records for every month of the season and securing a second consecutive American League West Division Championship. Athletics' outfielder Josh Reddick referred to Melvin as the "King of Platoons" due to his extensive use of platoons. In the 2013 regular season, the team was 96–66 with a .593 win–loss percentage. They then faced the Tigers in the Division Series. Oakland won two of the first three games and even had Game 5 set up in Oakland. They lost Game 4 and then were shutout in Game 5 to once again lose at home.

In 2014, Melvin's Athletics entered the All-Star Break with the best record in the majors. While the team faded down the stretch, it still managed to clinch an AL Wild Card berth on the final day of the season. They played the Kansas City Royals in the 2014 American League Wild Card Game. They held a 7–3 at the end of seven innings but Melvin ran into trouble when starter Jon Lester (coming up to 100 pitches) allowed a series of hits, a pair of stolen bases (made worse with the loss of catcher Geovany Soto to injury) and a walk that made the score 7–4 with two runners on base. Only then did Melvin decide to finally take out Lester (at 111 pitches), after which the bullpen gave up two further runs in the inning but Oakland still led 7–6 in the ninth inning. Further timely baserunning and hits led to more unraveling as the game went into extra innings on a tying 9th inning run. The Athletics even led 8–7 in the bottom of the 12th but gave up the lead and lost on a walk-off single. In 2015, Melvin only had his players place eleven sacrifice bunts, the lowest number in the AL.

On July 29, 2017, he became the 64th MLB manager to win 1,000 games in his career. On September 28, 2017, the Athletics and Melvin agreed to extend his contract through the 2019 season. In 2017, he used the most pinch hitters per game of any AL manager (0.79), and the fewest pinch runners per game (0.12).

On October 29, 2018, the Athletics awarded Melvin a long-term contract extension, through 2021 with a club option for 2022. On November 13, 2018, Melvin won his third Manager of the Year award, becoming just the 8th manager in MLB history to win the award three times. He won the award after leading the baseball team with the lowest Opening Day payroll to a 97–65 record and its first post-season in four years.

In 2019, he used the fewest pinch runners per game of all AL managers, at 0.07. On June 1, 2021; with a 12–6 win over the Seattle Mariners, Melvin tallied his 798th win as Athletics manager. This vaulted him past Tony La Russa to become the second-winningest manager in Athletics history, and the winningest in the West Coast portion of franchise history. In 2021 he led all AL managers with an average of 0.99 pinch hitters per game.

By the end of his Athletics tenure, his 853 wins were second-most in team history, behind only Hall of Fame manager Connie Mack. His 1,346 wins ranked 34th in MLB history. Among active Major League managers, only Dusty Baker, and Terry Francona had more wins. In Oakland, he had led them to six postseason appearances and three division titles; the Athletics lost in the first round in five of their six postseason appearances, winning just the 2020 AL Wild Card Series before losing in the 2020 ALDS. ESPN reported: "With the A's, Melvin developed a reputation as a players' manager as well as a keen strategist, and in a division in which his team often carried the lowest payroll, he found consistent success."

=== San Diego Padres (2021–2023) ===
On November 1, 2021, Melvin became the 22nd manager of the San Diego Padres. He signed a three-year contract.

In his first season as manager, Melvin led the Padres to the postseason, the Padres first playoff berth in a full season since 2006. In the Wild Card Series, against the New York Mets, the Padres defeated the Mets 2–1 to advance. Under Melvin, the Padres defeated the 111-win Los Angeles Dodgers three-games-to-one in the 2022 National League Division Series, but lost the league championship series to the Philadelphia Phillies 4 games to 1. That season, he had the team issue the lowest rate of intentional walks in the league (in 0.1% of plate appearances).

In 2023, Melvin led the Padres to a record of 82-80. They finished third in the NL West, one spot ahead of the 79-83 Giants. His 1,517 regular season wins ranked 25th all-time and were third-most among active managers behind Bruce Bochy (2,093) and Buck Showalter (1,727). One of 15 managers with eight postseason appearances in MLB history, Melvin is the only one to have never won a league pennant.

=== San Francisco Giants (2024–2025) ===
On October 25, 2023, Melvin was hired as the 39th manager of the San Francisco Giants, signing a three-year contract with the club. In his first season, the Giants finished with an 80–82 record.

On July 1, 2025, the Giants exercised Melvin's option for 2026.

In 2025, despite a major midseason acquisition of Rafael Devers, the Giants finished with an 81–81 record, only a one-win improvement from the last season and two games out of the final wild card spot. The Giants fired Melvin at the conclusion of the season, finishing his tenure in San Francisco with a 161–163 (.497) record in two seasons.

== Managerial record ==
Team	Year	Regular season					Postseason			
Team	Year	Games	Won	Lost	Win %	Finish	Won	Lost	Win %	Result
SEA	2003	162	93	69	.574	2nd in AL West	–	–	–	
SEA	2004	162	63	99	.389	4th in AL West	–	–	–	
SEA total		324	156	168	.481		–	–	–	
ARI	2005	162	77	85	.475	2nd in NL West	–	–	–	
ARI	2006	162	76	86	.469	4th in NL West	–	–	–	
ARI	2007	162	90	72	.556	1st in NL West	3	4	.429	Lost NLCS (COL)
ARI	2008	162	82	80	.506	2nd in NL West	–	–	–	
ARI	2009	29	12	17	.414	Fired	–	–	–	
ARI total		677	337	340	.498		3	4	.429	
OAK	2011	99	47	52	.475	3rd in AL West	–	–	–	
OAK	2012	162	94	68	.580	1st in AL West	2	3	.400	Lost ALDS (DET)
OAK	2013	162	96	66	.593	1st in AL West	2	3	.400	Lost ALDS (DET)
OAK	2014	162	88	74	.543	2nd in AL West	0	1	.000	Lost ALWC (KC)
OAK	2015	162	68	94	.420	5th in AL West	–	–	–	
OAK	2016	162	69	93	.426	5th in AL West	–	–	–	
OAK	2017	162	75	87	.463	5th in AL West	–	–	–	
OAK	2018	162	97	65	.599	2nd in AL West	0	1	.000	Lost ALWC (NYY)
OAK	2019	162	97	65	.599	2nd in AL West	0	1	.000	Lost ALWC (TB)
OAK	2020	60	36	24	.600	1st in AL West	3	4	.429	Lost ALDS (HOU)
OAK	2021	162	86	76	.531	3rd in AL West	–	–	–	
OAK total		1,617	853	764	.528		7	13	.350	
SD	2022	162	89	73	.549	2nd in NL West	6	6	.500	Lost NLCS (PHI)
SD	2023	162	82	80	.506	3rd in NL West	–	–	–	
SD total		324	171	153	.528		6	6	.500	
SF	2024	162	80	82	.494	4th in NL West	–	–	–	
SF	2025	162	81	81	.500	3rd in NL West	–	–	–	
SF total		324	161	163	.497		0	0	–	
Total		3,266	1,678	1,588	.514		16	23	.410	

== Personal life ==
Through 2021, he was one of seven Jewish managers in MLB history. The others were Gabe Kapler, Brad Ausmus, Jeff Newman, Norm Sherry, Lefty Phillips, and Lipman Pike.

He resides in Sedona, Arizona. Bob has one daughter, Alexi (born in 1988), who is an actress, Melvin and his daughter are actively involved with the Juvenile Diabetes Research Foundation; Alexi was diagnosed with juvenile diabetes at age 14.

== See also ==
- Arizona Diamondbacks award winners and league leaders
- Athletics award winners and league leaders
- List of Major League Baseball managerial wins and winning percentage leaders
- List of Major League Baseball managers with most career ejections
