= List of Major League Baseball managers with most career ejections =

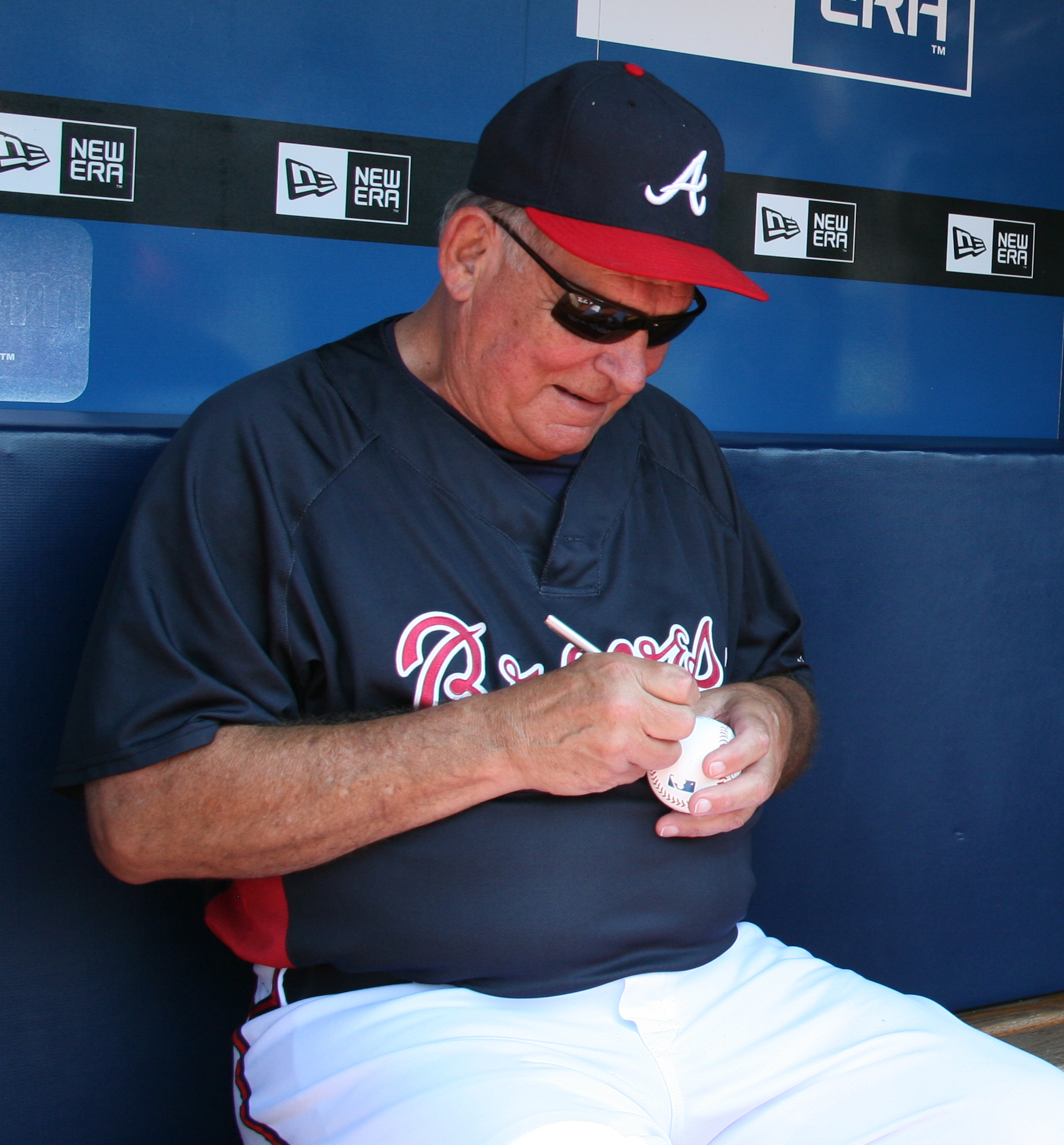
Bobby Cox, career leader in ejections, with 162.

Below is a list of the top 100 most ejected managers in Major League Baseball history as of the current 2026 season.

Former Atlanta Braves manager Bobby Cox holds the record with 162. Cox, John McGraw, and Leo Durocher are the only managers with at least 100 career ejections.

== Key ==
**Rank**	Rank amongst leaders in career ejections. A blank field indicates a tie.
*	Denotes elected to National Baseball Hall of Fame.
**Bold**	Denotes active manager. (Numbers in parentheses indicate how many ejections during the current MLB season.)

== List ==
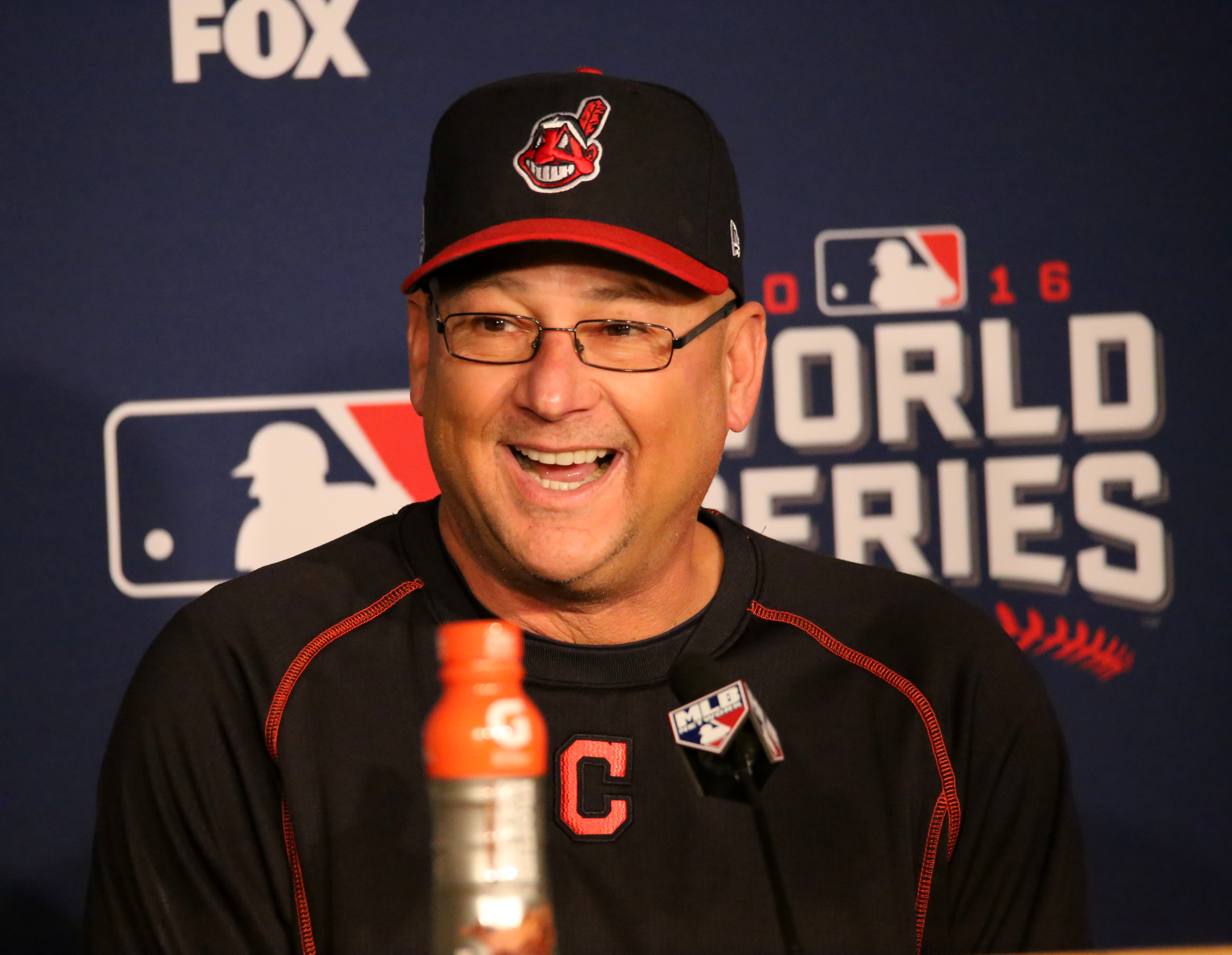
Terry Francona is the active leader in manager ejections and 20th all-time.

- Stats updated through September 27, 2026.

Rank	Name (2026 Ejections)	Total ejections
1	Bobby Cox*	162
2	John McGraw*	121
3	Leo Durocher*	100
4	Earl Weaver*	96
5	Tony La Russa*	93
6	Bruce Bochy	89
7	Frankie Frisch*	88
8	Ron Gardenhire	84
9	Paul Richards	82
10	Clark Griffith*	73
	Jim Leyland*	73
12	Joe Torre*	70
13	Bob Melvin	68
14	Clint Hurdle	64
	Lou Piniella	64
	Bill Rigney	64
17	Joe Maddon	59
18	Dick Williams*	57
19	Sparky Anderson*	56
20	**Terry Francona (1)**	55
21	Gene Mauch	54
22	John Gibbons	53
23	Charlie Manuel	52
24	**Aaron Boone (5)**	51
	Jimmy Dykes	51
26	Mike Hargrove	50
27	Tommy Lasorda*	48
	Billy Martin	48
29	Mike Scioscia	47
	Ned Yost	47
31	Jim Fregosi	46
32	Ralph Houk	45
	Fred Hutchinson	45
34	Phil Garner	44
	Bobby Valentine	44
36	Joe Girardi	43
37	Buddy Bell	42
	Whitey Herzog*	42
39	Terry Collins	40
	Casey Stengel*	40
41	Bud Black	38
	Pat Corrales	38
	**Craig Counsell (4)**	38
	**Don Mattingly (0)**	38
	Chuck Tanner	38
46	Walter Alston*	37
	Dave Bristol	37
48	Bill Dahlen	36
	Davey Johnson	36
	Buck Showalter	36

Rank	Name	Total ejections
51	Fred Clarke*	35
52	John McNamara	33
	Eric Wedge	33
	Jimy Williams	33
55	David Bell	32
	Bill McKechnie*	32
57	Darrell Johnson	31
	Fielder Jones	31
	Al Lopez*	31
60	Jerry Manuel	30
	Rick Renteria	30
62	Larry Bowa	29
	Roger Bresnahan*	29
	Ozzie Guillén	29
	Frank Robinson*	29
66	Lloyd McClendon	28
	Jim Riggleman	28
68	Cito Gaston	27
	Jim Tracy	27
70	Dusty Baker	26
	Fredi González	26
	Bucky Harris*	26
	Art Howe	26
	Miller Huggins*	26
	Eddie Stanky	26
76	Alvin Dark	25
	**A.J. Hinch (1)**	25
	Joe Kelley*	25
	**Oliver Marmol (4)**	25
	Buck Rodgers	25
	Scott Servais	25
82	Charlie Grimm	24
	Hughie Jennings*	24
	**Torey Lovullo (1)**	24
	Birdie Tebbetts	24
86	Gene Lamont	23
	Brian Snitker	23
88	Alex Cora	22
	Harry Walker	22
90	George Bamberger	21
	**Kevin Cash (1)**	21
	Red Dooin	21
	Frank Lucchesi	21
94	Rocco Baldelli	20
	**Mark Kotsay (3)**	20
	Mike Matheny	20
	Hal McRae	20
	Danny Murtaugh	20
	Danny Ozark	20
	**Derek Shelton (4)**	20
	Don Zimmer	20

== See also ==
- List of Major League Baseball managerial wins and winning percentage leaders
