= List of Major League Baseball managerial wins and winning percentage leaders =

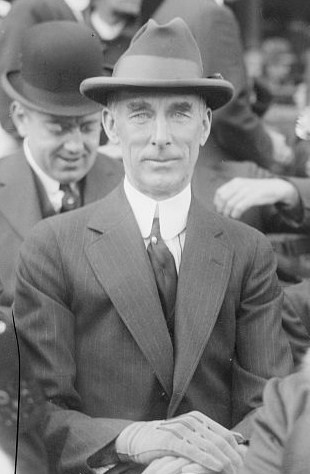
Connie Mack in 1916. Connie Mack is the all-time leader in career wins and losses by a manager.

This article contains a list of all Major League Baseball managers with at least 1,000 career regular season wins, a list of managers who have regular season win percentages over .540 in at least 400 games (2.5 full seasons), and a list of all-time World Series win-loss records. All three lists are current through the close of the 2026 MLB season.

Connie Mack is the all-time leader in wins (3,731) and losses (3,948). Terry Francona is the active wins leader (2,108) and is eleventh in overall wins. Vic Harris, who was a manager in the segregated Negro leagues, has the highest percentage at 547–278 (.663). Dave Roberts is the active leader in winning percentage at 1,044–638 (.621), which is also the highest in history outside of the minority leagues. Casey Stengel has the most game wins in the World Series with 37, while Joe McCarthy has the highest winning percentage, at 30–13 (.698).

== Managers with 1,000 or more wins ==
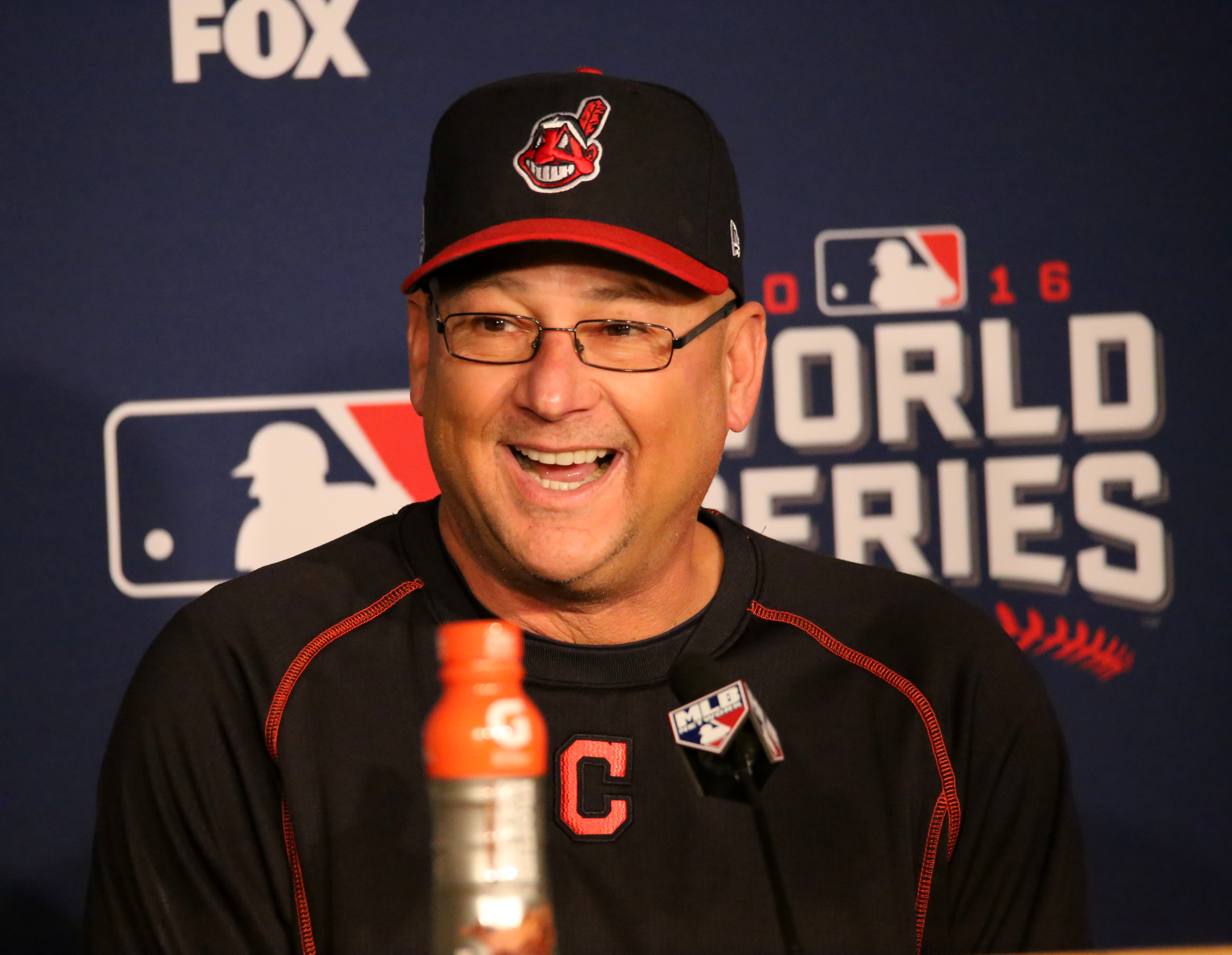
Terry Francona is the active leader in managerial wins and is eleventh overall.

Key
†	Member of the Baseball Hall of Fame
*	Denote manager is active

Rank	Name	Wins	Losses	Ties (Note: Ties are very uncommon in modern baseball, and are not counted in official standings, but all statistics accumulated in the game are counted. In normal play, ties should not occur in baseball, as the rules state that extra innings are played until one of the two teams wins the game. In modern baseball, tied games can only occur if such a game is the last scheduled between the two teams that season and has no bearing on the postseason. In all other cases, the game is merely suspended and completed at the first opportunity. Tied games were more common in the early days of baseball before the introduction of floodlights in MLB ballparks when darkness would halt games on occasion. The few ties that still occur are usually caused by bad weather.)	Pct.
1	Connie Mack^{†}	3,731	3,948	76	.486
2	Tony La Russa^{†}	2,884	2,499	4	.536
3	John McGraw^{†}	2,763	1,948	58	.586
4	Bobby Cox^{†}	2,504	2,001	3	.556
5	Joe Torre^{†}	2,326	1,997	6	.538
6	Bruce Bochy	2,252	2,266	0	.498
7	Sparky Anderson^{†}	2,194	1,834	2	.545
8	Dusty Baker	2,183	1,862	1	.540
9	Bucky Harris^{†}	2,158	2,219	33	.493
10	Joe McCarthy^{†}	2,125	1,333	29	.615
11	Terry Francona*	2,108	1,838	0	.534
12	Walter Alston^{†}	2,040	1,613	5	.558
13	Leo Durocher^{†}	2,008	1,709	22	.540
14	Casey Stengel^{†}	1,905	1,842	19	.508
15	Gene Mauch	1,902	2,037	3	.483
16	Bill McKechnie^{†}	1,896	1,723	28	.524
17	Lou Piniella	1,835	1,713	0	.517
18	Jim Leyland^{†}	1,769	1,728	2	.506
19	Buck Showalter	1,726	1,665	1	.509
20	Bob Melvin	1,678	1,588	0	.514
21	Mike Scioscia	1,650	1,428	0	.536
22	Ralph Houk	1,619	1,531	7	.514
23	Fred Clarke^{†}	1,602	1,181	43	.576
24	Tommy Lasorda^{†}	1,599	1,439	2	.526
25	Dick Williams^{†}	1,571	1,451	1	.520
26	Clark Griffith^{†}	1,491	1,367	59	.522
27	Earl Weaver^{†}	1,480	1,060	1	.583
28	Miller Huggins^{†}	1,413	1,134	23	.555
29	Al Lopez^{†}	1,410	1,004	11	.584
30	Jimmy Dykes	1,406	1,541	15	.477
31	Wilbert Robinson^{†}	1,399	1,398	21	.500
32	Joe Maddon	1,382	1,216	1	.532
33	Davey Johnson	1,372	1,071	2	.562
34	Chuck Tanner	1,352	1,381	5	.495
35	Ned Hanlon^{†}	1,313	1,164	53	.530
36	Cap Anson^{†}	1,295	947	46	.578
37	Charlie Grimm	1,287	1,067	14	.547
38	Frank Selee^{†}	1,284	862	34	.598
39	Whitey Herzog^{†}	1,281	1,125	3	.532
40	Clint Hurdle	1,269	1,345	1	.485
41	Billy Martin	1,253	1,013	1	.553
42	Bill Rigney	1,239	1,321	1	.484
43	Joe Cronin^{†}	1,236	1,055	24	.540
44	Harry Wright^{†}	1,225	885	35	.581
45	Ned Yost	1,203	1,341	0	.473
46	Ron Gardenhire	1,200	1,280	0	.484
47	Bud Black	1,193	1,403	0	.460
48	Mike Hargrove	1,188	1,173	2	.503
49	Bobby Valentine	1,186	1,165	0	.504
50	Hughie Jennings^{†}	1,184	995	23	.543
51	Lou Boudreau^{†}	1,162	1,224	18	.487
52	John McNamara	1,160	1,233	2	.485
53	Tom Kelly	1,140	1,244	1	.478
54	Frankie Frisch^{†}	1,138	1,078	30	.514
55	Art Howe	1,129	1,137	0	.498
56	Joe Girardi	1,120	935	0	.545
57	Danny Murtaugh	1,115	950	3	.540
58	Frank Robinson^{†}	1,065	1,176	0	.475
59	Jack McKeon	1,051	990	1	.515
60	Dave Roberts*	1,044	638	0	.621
60	Billy Southworth^{†}	1,044	704	22	.597
62	Candy Jim Taylor	1,042	1,093	34	.488
63	Red Schoendienst^{†}	1,041	955	3	.522
64	A. J. Hinch*	1,040	954	0	.522
64	Steve O'Neill	1,040	821	18	.559
66	Felipe Alou	1,033	1,021	1	.503
67	Jim Fregosi	1,028	1,095	0	.484
68	Chuck Dressen	1,008	973	9	.509
69	Charlie Manuel	1,000	826	0	.548

== Win percentage ==
Managers included have managed at least 400 games – around 2.5 full seasons and a group including 323 managers – and regular season win percentages over .540. Note that the total number of games listed for each manager in this table includes tie games, though ties are not included in "decided game" statistics. The lowest winning percentage for a qualifying manager is Doc Prothro: .301 (138–320–2) in 460 games.

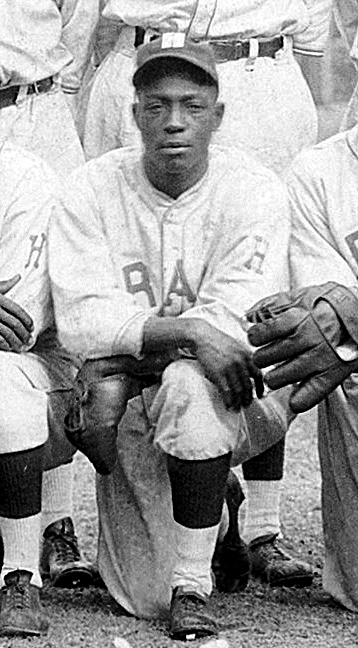
Vic Harris has the highest winning percentage of all time. Harris managed the Homestead Grays to seven Negro National League pennants and one Negro World Series title in eleven seasons as manager.

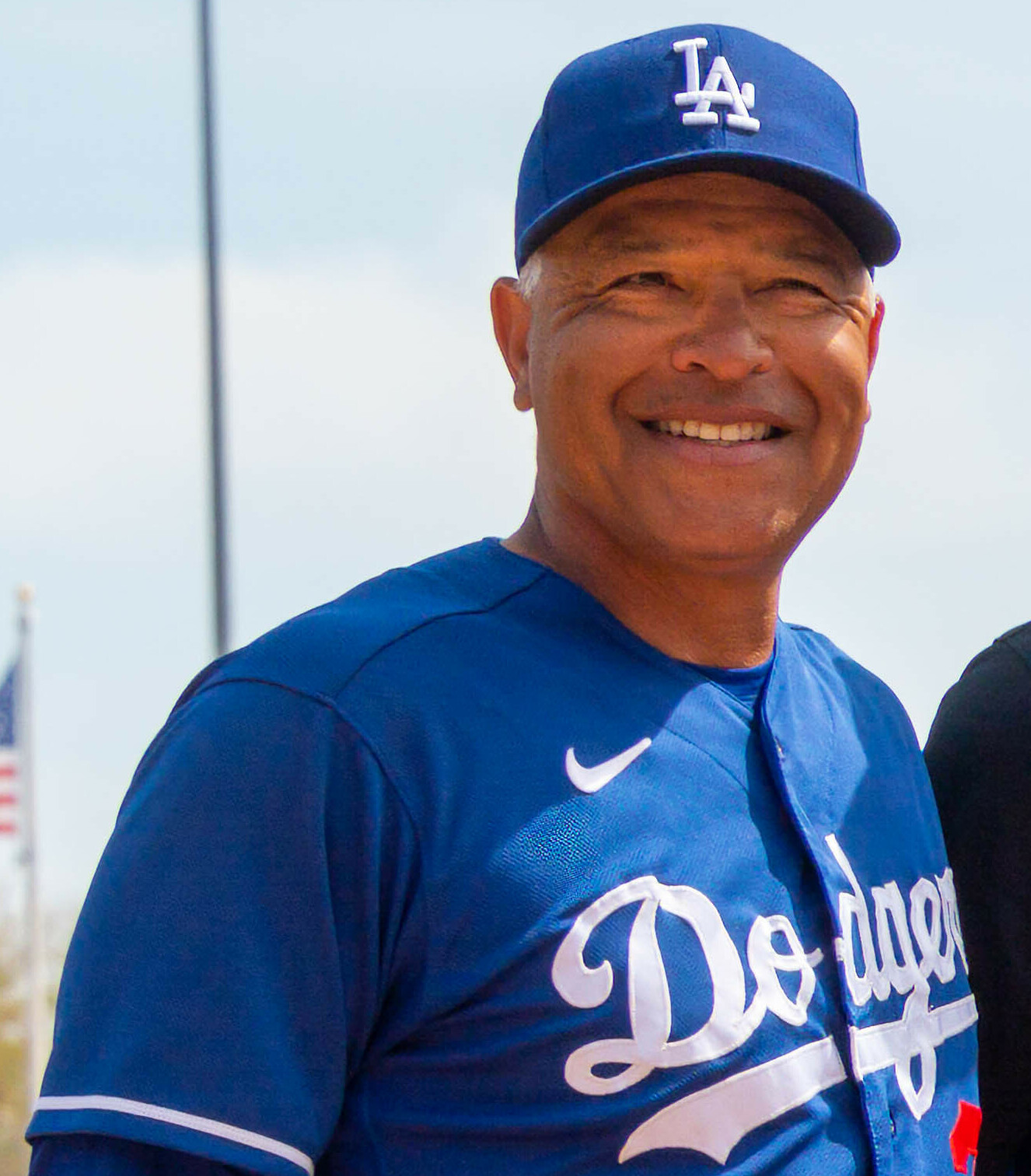
Dave Roberts is the manager of the Los Angeles Dodgers, winning three World Series. Roberts is the leader in winning percentage by an active manager.

Rank	Name	Win Pct.	Games	Wins	Losses
1	Vic Harris	.664	987	637	322
2	Rube Foster^{†}	.637	546	341	194
3	Dave Malarcher	.627	435	267	159
4	Dave Roberts*	.621	1,682	1,044	638
5	Joe McCarthy^{†}	.615	3,487	2,125	1,333
6	Jim Mutrie	.611	1,114	658	419
7	Charles Comiskey^{†}	.608	1,408	839	540
8	Frank Selee^{†}	.598	2,180	1,284	862
9	Billy Southworth^{†}	.597	1,770	1,044	704
10	Frank Chance^{†}	.593	1,622	946	648
11	John McGraw^{†}	.586	4,769	2,763	1,948
12	Al Lopez^{†}	.584	2,425	1,410	1,004
13	Aaron Boone*	.583	1,355	790	565
13	Earl Weaver^{†}	.583	2,541	1,480	1,060
15	Mickey Cochrane^{†}	.582	600	348	250
16	Harry Wright^{†}	.581	2,185	1,225	885
17	Cap Anson^{†}	.578	2,288	1,295	947
17	Eddie Dyer	.578	777	446	325
17	Pants Rowland	.578	590	339	247
20	Fred Clarke^{†}	.576	2,826	1,602	1,181
20	Pat Murphy*	.576	582	335	247
22	Ossie Vitt	.570	462	262	198
23	Bill McGunnigle	.569	586	327	248
24	Rob Thomson	.568	625	355	270
25	Frank Duncan	.567	602	337	257
25	Winfield Welch	.567	537	300	229
27	Felton Snow	.565	595	331	255
28	John Montgomery Ward^{†}	.563	751	412	320
29	Davey Johnson	.562	2,445	1,372	1,071
30	Pat Moran	.561	1,344	748	586
30	Mike Shildt	.561	775	435	340
32	Steve O'Neill	.559	1,879	1,040	821
33	Walter Alston^{†}	.558	3,658	2,040	1,613
34	Bobby Cox^{†}	.556	4,508	2,504	2,001
34	Larry Dierker	.556	783	435	348
36	Miller Huggins^{†}	.555	2,570	1,413	1,134
36	Patsy Tebeau	.555	1,339	726	583
36	Bill Terry^{†}	.555	1,496	823	661
39	Buck Ewing^{†}	.554	903	489	395
39	Billy Martin	.554	2,267	1,253	1,013
41	Grady Little	.552	648	358	290
42	Walter Johnson^{†}	.550	966	529	432
42	Nap Lajoie^{†}	.550	700	377	309
44	Jimmy Collins^{†}	.548	677	367	303
44	Charlie Manuel	.548	1,826	1,000	826
44	Bill Shettsline	.548	842	455	376
44	Brian Snitker	.548	1,479	811	668
48	Charlie Grimm	.547	2,368	1,287	1,067
49	George Gibson	.546	759	413	344
49	Dick Lundy	.546	589	316	263
49	Sam Mele	.546	963	524	436
49	Stephen Vogt*	.546	485	265	220
53	Sparky Anderson^{†}	.545	4,030	2,194	1,834
53	Joe Girardi	.545	2,055	1,120	935
55	Dick Howser	.544	933	507	425
55	Willie Randolph	.544	555	302	253
57	Hughie Jennings^{†}	.543	2,203	1,184	995
57	Tris Speaker^{†}	.543	1,139	617	520
59	Dusty Baker	.540	4,046	2,183	1,862
59	Kevin Cash*	.540	1,842	994	848
59	Joe Cronin^{†}	.540	2,315	1,236	1,055
59	Leo Durocher^{†}	.540	3,739	2,008	1,709
59	Fielder Jones	.540	1,297	683	582
59	Ken Macha	.540	972	525	447
59	Danny Murtaugh	.540	2,068	1,115	950

== World Series win-loss records ==
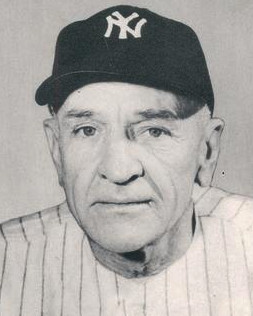
Casey Stengel has the most World Series wins in MLB history.

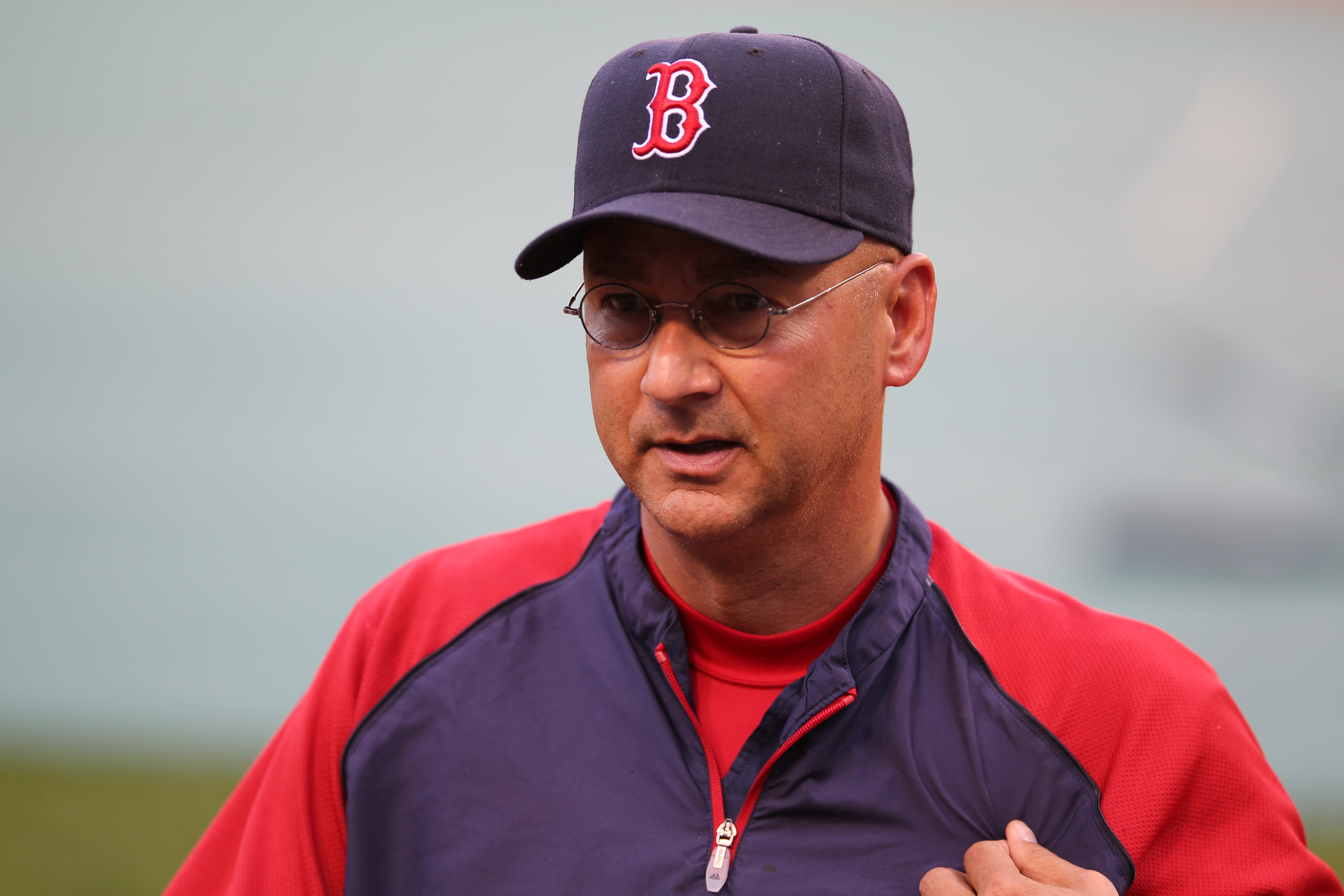
Terry Francona has the highest winning percentage of any manager who managed more than 10 World Series games.

The following is a list of all-time World Series win-loss records for managers.

Manager	Wins	Losses	Ties	Pct.	Games	World Series/ Pennants
Casey Stengel^{†}	37	27	0	.578	64	7/10
Joe McCarthy^{†}	30	13	0	.698	43	7/9
John McGraw^{†}	26	28	2	.482	56	3/10
Connie Mack^{†}	24	19	0	.558	43	5/9
Joe Torre^{†}	21	11	0	.657	32	4/6
Walter Alston^{†}	20	20	0	.500	40	4/7
Miller Huggins^{†}	18	15	1	.544	34	3/6
Bruce Bochy	16	9	0	.640	25	4/5
Sparky Anderson^{†}	16	11	0	.593	27	3/5
Dave Roberts*	16	14	0	.533	30	3/5
Tony La Russa^{†}	13	17	0	.433	30	3/6
Dick Williams^{†}	12	14	0	.462	26	2/4
Tommy Lasorda^{†}	12	11	0	.522	23	2/4
Bobby Cox^{†}	11	18	0	.379	29	1/5
Earl Weaver^{†}	11	13	0	.458	24	1/4
Billy Southworth^{†}	11	11	0	.500	22	2/4
Bucky Harris^{†}	11	10	0	.524	21	2/3
Frank Chance^{†}	11	7	1	.605	19	2/4
Terry Francona*	11	4	0	.733	15	2/3
Whitey Herzog^{†}	10	11	0	.476	21	1/3
Dusty Baker	9	10	0	.474	19	1/3
Bill McKechnie^{†}	8	14	0	.364	22	2/4
Ralph Houk	8	8	0	.500	16	2/3
Tom Kelly	8	6	0	.571	14	2/2
Danny Murtaugh	8	6	0	.571	14	2/2
Cito Gaston	8	4	0	.667	12	2/2
Bill Carrigan	8	2	0	.800	10	2/2
Bill Terry^{†}	7	9	0	.438	16	1/3
Fred Clarke^{†}	7	8	0	.467	15	1/4
Leo Durocher^{†}	7	8	0	.467	15	1/3
Fred Haney	7	7	0	.500	14	1/2
A. J. Hinch*	7	7	0	.500	14	1/2
Red Schoendienst^{†}	7	7	0	.500	14	1/2
Mickey Cochrane^{†}	7	6	0	.538	13	1/2
Ned Yost	7	5	0	.583	12	1/2
Yogi Berra^{†}	6	8	0	.429	14	0/2
Pat Moran	6	7	0	.462	13	1/2
Gabby Street	6	7	0	.462	13	1/2
Bob Lemon^{†}	6	6	0	.500	12	1/2
Charlie Manuel	6	5	0	.545	11	1/2
Charlie Grimm	5	12	0	.294	17	0/3
Jim Leyland^{†}	5	11	0	.313	16	1/3
Chuck Dressen	5	8	0	.385	13	0/2
Mike Hargrove	5	8	0	.385	13	0/2
Joe Cronin^{†}	5	7	0	.417	12	0/2
Joe Maddon	5	7	0	.417	12	1/2
Jimmy Collins^{†}	5	3	0	.625	8	1/2
Tris Speaker^{†}	5	2	0	.714	7	1/1
Hughie Jennings^{†}	4	12	1	.265	17	0/3
Burt Shotton	4	8	0	.333	12	0/2
Ron Washington	4	8	0	.333	12	0/2
Billy Martin	4	6	0	.400	10	1/2
Jake Stahl	4	3	1	.563	8	1/1
Eddie Dyer	4	3	0	.571	7	1/1
Bob Brenly	4	3	0	.571	7	1/1
Frankie Frisch^{†}	4	3	0	.571	7	1/1
Rogers Hornsby^{†}	4	3	0	.571	7	1/1
Dick Howser	4	3	0	.571	7	1/1
Davey Johnson	4	3	0	.571	7	1/1
Johnny Keane	4	3	0	.571	7	1/1
Dave Martinez	4	3	0	.571	7	1/1
Steve O'Neill	4	3	0	.571	7	1/1
Mike Scioscia	4	3	0	.571	7	1/1
Mayo Smith	4	3	0	.571	7	1/1
Chuck Tanner	4	3	0	.571	7	1/1
Ed Barrow^{†}	4	2	0	.667	6	1/1
Lou Boudreau^{†}	4	2	0	.667	6	1/1
John Farrell	4	2	0	.667	6	1/1
Joe Girardi	4	2	0	.667	6	1/1
Dallas Green	4	2	0	.667	6	1/1
Fielder Jones	4	2	0	.667	6	1/1
Jack McKeon	4	2	0	.667	6	1/1
Brian Snitker	4	2	0	.667	6	1/1
Joe Altobelli	4	1	0	.800	5	1/1
Alex Cora	4	1	0	.800	5	1/1
Alvin Dark	4	1	0	.800	5	1/1
Gil Hodges^{†}	4	1	0	.800	5	1/1
Pants Rowland	4	1	0	.800	5	1/1
Pat Murphy*	4	1	0	.800	5	1/1
Hank Bauer	4	0	0	1.000	4	1/1
Ozzie Guillen	4	0	0	1.000	4	1/1
Lou Piniella	4	0	0	1.000	4	1/1
George Stallings	4	0	0	1.000	4	1/1
Wilbert Robinson^{†}	3	9	0	.250	12	0/2
Kevin Cash*	3	8	0	.273	11	0/2
Kid Gleason	3	5	0	.375	8	0/1
Del Baker	3	4	0	.429	7	0/1
Darrell Johnson	3	4	0	.429	7	0/1
Harvey Kuenn	3	4	0	.429	7	0/1
John McNamara	3	4	0	.429	7	0/1
Sam Mele	3	4	0	.429	7	0/1
John Schneider*	3	4	0	.429	7	0/1
Al López^{†}	2	8	0	.200	10	0/2
Jim Frey	2	4	0	.333	6	0/1
Jim Fregosi	2	4	0	.333	6	0/1
Mike Matheny	2	4	0	.333	6	0/1
Fred Mitchell	2	4	0	.333	6	0/1
Luke Sewell	2	4	0	.333	6	0/1
Rob Thomson	2	4	0	.333	6	0/1
Aaron Boone*	1	4	0	.200	5	0/1
Terry Collins	1	4	0	.200	5	0/1
Torey Lovullo*	1	4	0	.200	5	0/1
Paul Owens	1	4	0	.200	5	0/1
Bobby Valentine	1	4	0	.200	5	0/1
Donie Bush	0	4	0	.000	4	0/1
Roger Craig	0	4	0	.000	4	0/1
Phil Garner	0	4	0	.000	4	0/1
Gabby Hartnett^{†}	0	4	0	.000	4	0/1
Clint Hurdle	0	4	0	.000	4	0/1
Eddie Sawyer	0	4	0	.000	4	0/1

== See also ==
- List of Major League Baseball managers with most career ejections
- Major League Baseball Manager of the Year Award
- The Sporting News Manager of the Year Award
