= Major League Baseball Manager of the Year Award =

Award

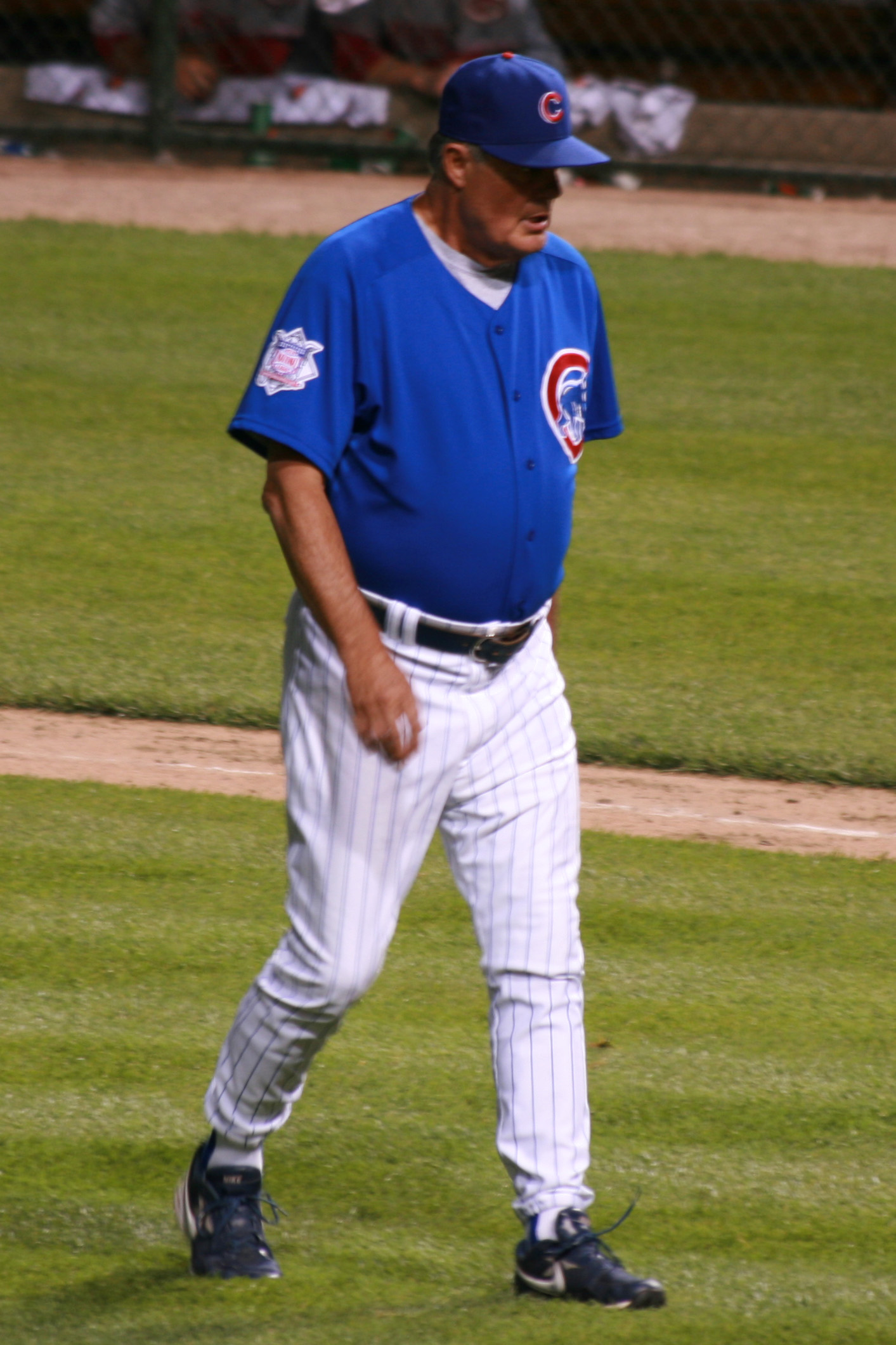
- Lou Piniella won the 2008 National League Manager of the Year Award, and won twice in the American League.
- Sport: Baseball
- League: Major League Baseball
- Awarded for: Best manager of American League and National League
- Country: United States, Canada
- Presented by: Baseball Writers' Association of America

History
- First award: 1983
- Most recent: Will Venable (AL) Pat Murphy (NL)

In Major League Baseball, the Manager of the Year Award is an honor given annually since 1983 to two outstanding managers, one each in the American League (AL) and the National League (NL). The winner is voted on by 30 members of the Baseball Writers' Association of America (BBWAA). Each submits a vote for first, second, and third place among the managers of each league.^{[a]} The manager with the highest score in each league wins the award.

In 1991, Bobby Cox became the first manager to win the award in both leagues, winning with the Atlanta Braves and having previously won with the Toronto Blue Jays in 1985. La Russa, Piniella, Showalter, Jim Leyland, Bob Melvin, Davey Johnson, and Joe Maddon have since won the award in both leagues. Cox, La Russa, and Showalter have won the most awards, with four. Baker, Leyland, Piniella, Maddon, Melvin, and Terry Francona have won three times. In 2005, Cox became the first manager to win the award in consecutive years. Cash became the second manager in 2021, and first in the AL to win the award in consecutive years. When Stephen Vogt and Pat Murphy won in 2025, it was the first time that both leagues had repeat Manager of the Year winners in the same season. Will Venable of the Chicago White Sox and Pat Murphy of the Milwaukee Brewers are the most recent winners. Every MLB franchise has won the award at least once.

Because of the 1994–95 Major League Baseball strike cut the season short and canceled the post-season, the BBWAA writers effectively created a de facto mythical national championship (similar to college football) by naming managers of the unofficial league champions (lead the leagues in winning percentage) (Buck Showalter and Felipe Alou) as Managers of the Year. The Chicago White Sox have seen five managers win the award, the most in the majors.

Only five managers have won the award while leading a team that finished outside the top two spots in its division. Buck Rodgers was the first, winning the award in 1987 with the third-place Expos. Tony Peña and Showalter won the award with third-place teams in back-to-back years: Peña with the Royals in 2003, and Showalter with the Rangers in 2004. Joe Girardi is the only manager to win the award with a fourth-place team (2006 Florida Marlins); he is also the only manager to win the award after fielding a team with a losing record.

== Key ==
†	Member of the National Baseball Hall of Fame
^	Indicates multiple award winners in the same year
(#)	Number of wins by managers who have won the award multiple times
Year	Each year links to that particular Major League Baseball season
**Bold**	The manager's team won the World Series in the same season

== Winners ==
=== American League ===
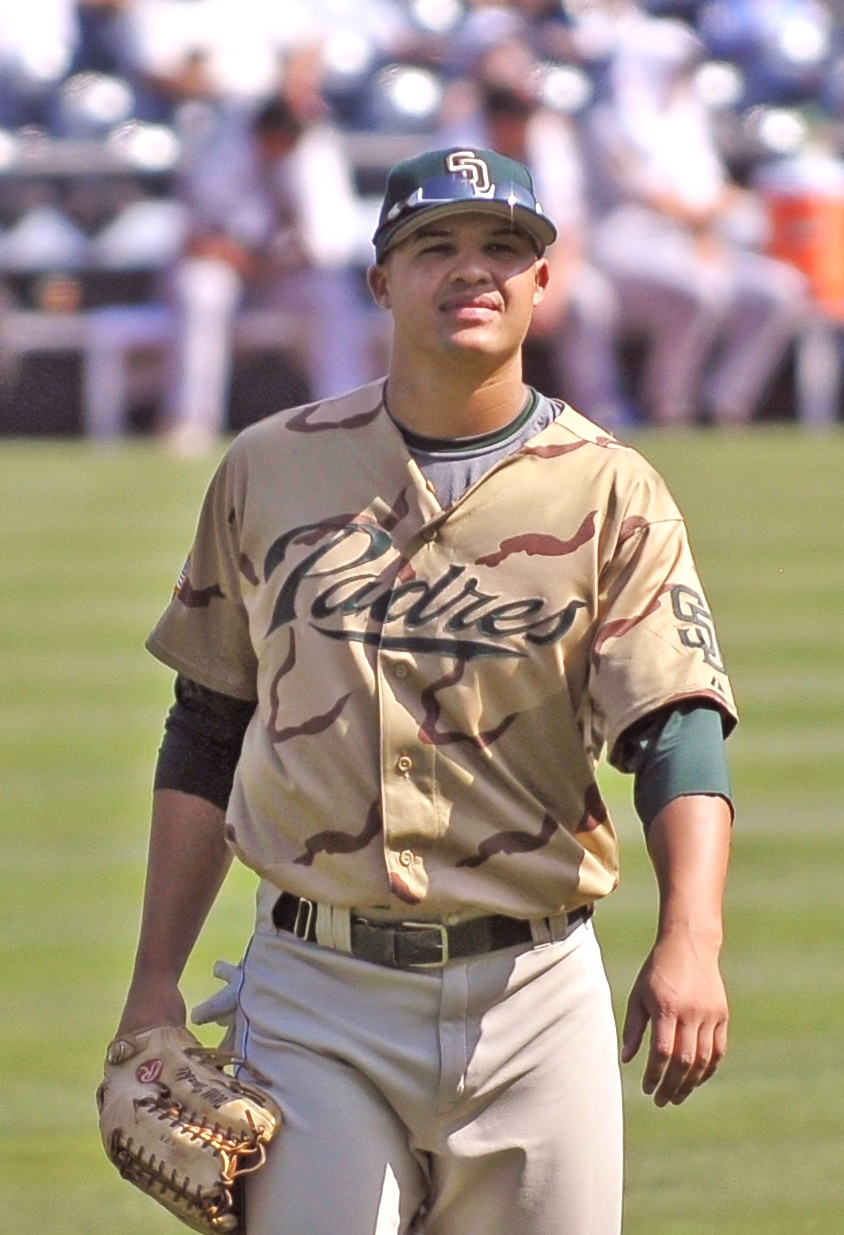
Will Venable, 2026 AL winner

Year	Manager	Team	Division	Finish	Record
1983	Tony La Russa ^{†}	Chicago White Sox	West	1st	99–63
1984	Sparky Anderson ^{†}	**Detroit Tigers**	East	1st	104–58
1985	Bobby Cox ^{†}	Toronto Blue Jays	East	1st	99–62
1986	John McNamara	Boston Red Sox	East	1st	95–66
1987	Sparky Anderson (2)^{†}	Detroit Tigers	East	1st	98–64
1988	Tony La Russa (2)^{†}	Oakland Athletics	West	1st	104–58
1989	Frank Robinson^{†}	Baltimore Orioles	East	2nd	87–75
1990	Jeff Torborg	Chicago White Sox	West	2nd	94–68
1991	Tom Kelly	**Minnesota Twins**	West	1st	95–67
1992	Tony La Russa (3)^{†}	Oakland Athletics	West	1st	96–66
1993	Gene Lamont	Chicago White Sox	West	1st	94–68
1994^{[b]}	Buck Showalter	New York Yankees	East	1st	70–43
1995	Lou Piniella	Seattle Mariners	West	1st	79–66
1996^{^}^{[c]}	Johnny Oates	Texas Rangers	West	1st	90–72
1996^{^}^{[c]}	Joe Torre^{†}	**New York Yankees**	East	1st	92–70
1997	Davey Johnson	Baltimore Orioles	East	1st	98–64
1998	Joe Torre (2)^{†}	**New York Yankees**	East	1st	114–48
1999	Jimy Williams	Boston Red Sox	East	2nd	94–68
2000	Jerry Manuel	Chicago White Sox	Central	1st	95–67
2001	Lou Piniella (2)	Seattle Mariners	West	1st	116–46
2002	Mike Scioscia	**Anaheim Angels**	West	2nd	99–63
2003	Tony Peña	Kansas City Royals	Central	3rd	83–79
2004	Buck Showalter (2)	Texas Rangers	West	3rd	89–73
2005	Ozzie Guillén	**Chicago White Sox**	Central	1st	99–63
2006	Jim Leyland (3)^{†}	Detroit Tigers	Central	2nd	95–67
2007	Eric Wedge	Cleveland Indians	Central	1st	96–66
2008	Joe Maddon	Tampa Bay Rays	East	1st	97–65
2009	Mike Scioscia (2)	Los Angeles Angels	West	1st	97–65
2010	Ron Gardenhire	Minnesota Twins	Central	1st	94–68
2011	Joe Maddon (2)	Tampa Bay Rays	East	2nd	91–71
2012	Bob Melvin (2)	Oakland Athletics	West	1st	94–68
2013	Terry Francona	Cleveland Indians	Central	2nd	92–70
2014	Buck Showalter (3)	Baltimore Orioles	East	1st	96–66
2015	Jeff Banister	Texas Rangers	West	1st	88–74
2016	Terry Francona (2)	Cleveland Indians	Central	1st	94–67
2017	Paul Molitor^{†}	Minnesota Twins	Central	2nd	85–77
2018	Bob Melvin (3)	Oakland Athletics	West	2nd	97–65
2019	Rocco Baldelli	Minnesota Twins	Central	1st	101–61
2020^{[d]}	Kevin Cash	Tampa Bay Rays	East	1st	40–20
2021	Kevin Cash (2)	Tampa Bay Rays	East	1st	100–62
2022	Terry Francona (3)	Cleveland Guardians	Central	1st	92–70
2023	Brandon Hyde	Baltimore Orioles	East	1st	101–61
2024	Stephen Vogt	Cleveland Guardians	Central	1st	92–69
2025	Stephen Vogt (2)	Cleveland Guardians	Central	1st	88–74
2026	Will Venable	Chicago White Sox	Central	2nd	84–78

=== National League ===
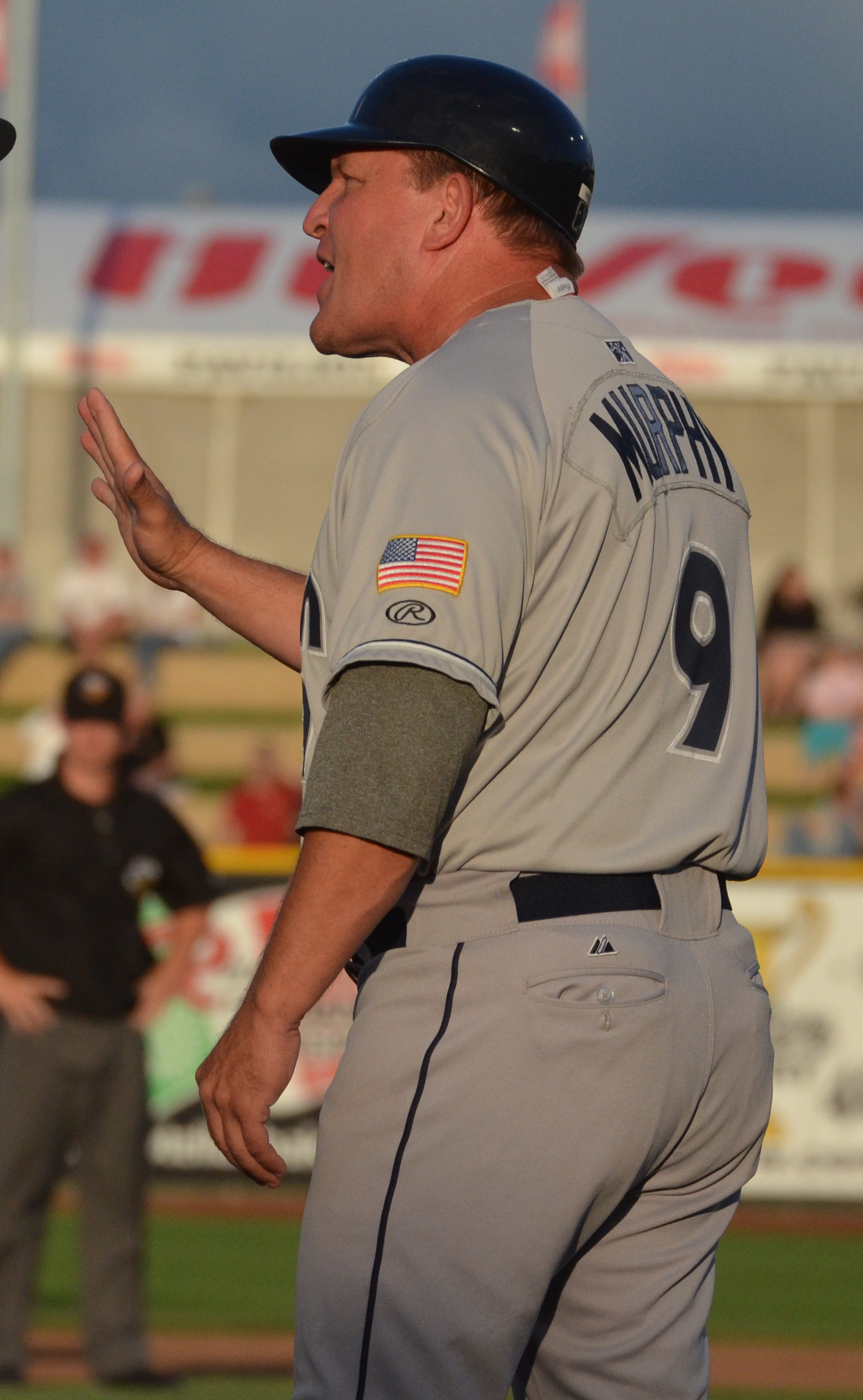
Pat Murphy, 2024, 2025 & 2026 NL winner

Year	Manager	Team	Division	Finish	Record
1983	Tommy Lasorda ^{†}	Los Angeles Dodgers	West	1st	91–71
1984	Jim Frey	Chicago Cubs	East	1st	96–65
1985	Whitey Herzog^{†}	St. Louis Cardinals	East	1st	101–61
1986	Hal Lanier	Houston Astros	West	1st	96–66
1987	Buck Rodgers	Montreal Expos	East	3rd	91–71
1988	Tommy Lasorda (2)^{†}	**Los Angeles Dodgers**	West	1st	94–67
1989	Don Zimmer	Chicago Cubs	East	1st	93–69
1990	Jim Leyland^{†}	Pittsburgh Pirates	East	1st	95–67
1991	Bobby Cox (2)^{†}	Atlanta Braves	East	1st	94–68
1992	Jim Leyland (2)^{†}	Pittsburgh Pirates	East	1st	96–66
1993	Dusty Baker	San Francisco Giants	West	2nd	103–59
1994^{[b]}	Felipe Alou	Montreal Expos	East	1st	74–40
1995	Don Baylor	Colorado Rockies	West	2nd	77–67
1996	Bruce Bochy	San Diego Padres	West	1st	91–71
1997	Dusty Baker (2)	San Francisco Giants	West	1st	90–72
1998	Larry Dierker	Houston Astros	Central	1st	102–60
1999	Jack McKeon	Cincinnati Reds	Central	2nd	96–67
2000	Dusty Baker (3)	San Francisco Giants	West	1st	97–65
2001	Larry Bowa	Philadelphia Phillies	East	2nd	86–76
2002	Tony La Russa (4)^{†}	St. Louis Cardinals	Central	1st	97–65
2003	Jack McKeon^{[e]} (2)	**Florida Marlins**	East	2nd	75–49
2004	Bobby Cox (3)^{†}	Atlanta Braves	East	1st	96–66
2005	Bobby Cox (4)^{†}	Atlanta Braves	East	1st	90–72
2006	Joe Girardi	Florida Marlins	East	4th	78–84
2007	Bob Melvin	Arizona Diamondbacks	West	1st	90–72
2008	Lou Piniella (3)	Chicago Cubs	Central	1st	97–64
2009	Jim Tracy^{[e]}	Colorado Rockies	West	2nd	74–32
2010	Bud Black	San Diego Padres	West	2nd	90–72
2011	Kirk Gibson	Arizona Diamondbacks	West	1st	94–68
2012	Davey Johnson (2)	Washington Nationals	East	1st	98–64
2013	Clint Hurdle	Pittsburgh Pirates	Central	2nd	94–68
2014	Matt Williams	Washington Nationals	East	1st	96–66
2015	Joe Maddon (3)	Chicago Cubs	Central	3rd	97–65
2016	Dave Roberts	Los Angeles Dodgers	West	1st	91–71
2017	Torey Lovullo	Arizona Diamondbacks	West	2nd	93–69
2018	Brian Snitker	Atlanta Braves	East	1st	90–72
2019	Mike Shildt	St. Louis Cardinals	Central	1st	91–71
2020^{[d]}	Don Mattingly	Miami Marlins	East	2nd	31–29
2021	Gabe Kapler	San Francisco Giants	West	1st	107–55
2022	Buck Showalter (4)	New York Mets	East	2nd	101–61
2023	Skip Schumaker	Miami Marlins	East	3rd	84–78
2024	Pat Murphy	Milwaukee Brewers	Central	1st	93–69
2025	Pat Murphy (2)	Milwaukee Brewers	Central	1st	97–65
2026	Pat Murphy (3)	**Milwaukee Brewers**	Central	1st	103–59

== Multiple-time winners ==
Manager	# of Awards	Years
Tony La Russa^{†}	4	1983 (AL), 1988 (AL), 1992 (AL), 2002 (NL)
Bobby Cox^{†}	4	1985 (AL), 1991 (NL), 2004 (NL), 2005 (NL)
Buck Showalter	4	1994 (AL), 2004 (AL), 2014 (AL), 2022 (NL)
Dusty Baker	3	1993 (NL), 1997 (NL), 2000 (NL)
Jim Leyland^{†}	3	1990 (NL), 1992 (NL), 2006 (AL)
Lou Piniella	3	1995 (AL), 2001 (AL), 2008 (NL)
Joe Maddon	3	2008 (AL), 2011 (AL), 2015 (NL)
Terry Francona	3	2013 (AL), 2016 (AL), 2022 (AL)
Bob Melvin	3	2007 (NL), 2012 (AL), 2018 (AL)
Pat Murphy	3	2024 (NL), 2025 (NL), 2026 (NL)
Sparky Anderson^{†}	2	1984 (AL), 1987 (AL)
Joe Torre^{†}	2	1996 (AL), 1998 (AL)
Mike Scioscia	2	2002 (AL), 2009 (AL)
Jack McKeon	2	1999 (NL), 2003 (NL)
Tommy Lasorda^{†}	2	1983 (NL), 1988 (NL)
Davey Johnson	2	1997 (AL), 2012 (NL)
Kevin Cash	2	2020 (AL), 2021 (AL)
Stephen Vogt	2	2024 (AL), 2025 (AL)

== See also ==
- "Esurance MLB Awards" Best Manager (in MLB)
- Baseball America Manager of the Year
- Baseball Prospectus Internet Baseball Awards Manager of the Year
- Chuck Tanner Major League Baseball Manager of the Year Award
- Associated Press Manager of the Year (discontinued in 2001)
- Honor Rolls of Baseball#Managers
- MLB All-Time Manager (1997; BBWAA)
- Sporting News Manager of the Decade (2009)
- Sports Illustrated MLB Manager of the Decade (2009)
- Major League Baseball all-time managerial wins
- Best Coach/Manager ESPY Award (all sports)

== Notes ==
- **^{a}** The formula used to calculate the final scores is Score = 5F + 3S + T, where F is the number of first-place votes, S is second -place votes, and T is third-place votes.
- **^{b}** The 1994–95 Major League Baseball strike ended the season on August 11, as well as cancelling the entire postseason, with writers effectively turning the vote into a de facto mythical national championship, similar to college football.
- **^{c}** Johnny Oates and Joe Torre tied for the lead among voters in the American League in 1996.
- **^{d}** Teams played a truncated 60-game season in 2020 due to the COVID-19 pandemic.
- **^{e}** Won the award after taking over the team mid-season, the record listed indicates the team's record after taking over.
