= Bobby Cox =

American baseball player and manager (1941–2026)

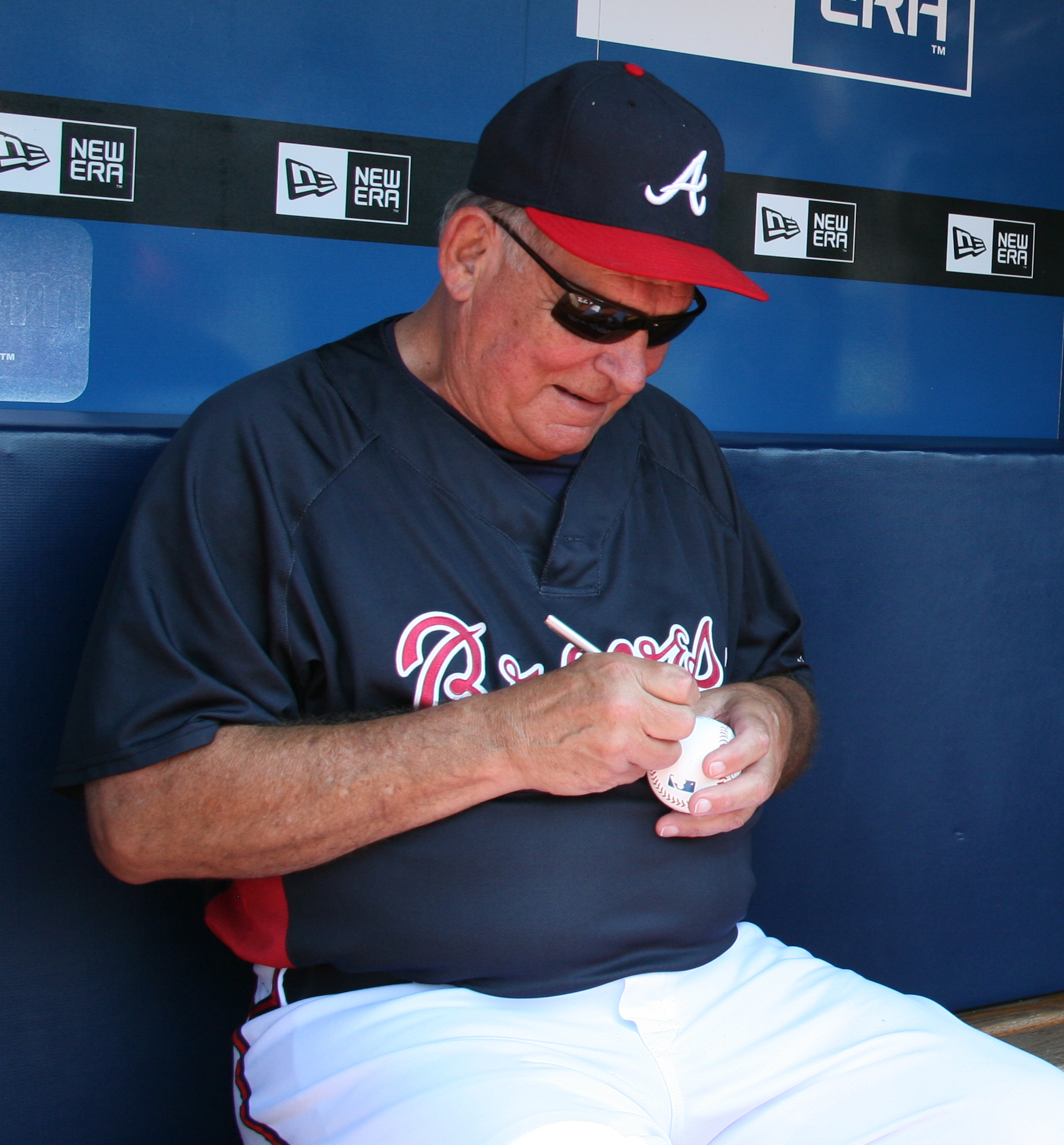
- Cox in 2009
- Third baseman / Manager
- Born: May 21, 1941; Tulsa, Oklahoma, U.S.
- Died: May 9, 2026 (aged 84); Marietta, Georgia, U.S.
- Batted: Right Threw: Right

MLB debut
- April 14, 1968, for the New York Yankees

Last MLB appearance
- October 1, 1969, for the New York Yankees

MLB statistics
- Batting average: .225
- Home runs: 9
- Runs batted in: 58
- Managerial record: 2,504–2,001–3
- Winning %: .556
- Stats at Baseball Reference
- Managerial record at Baseball Reference

Teams
- As player: New York Yankees (1968–1969); As manager: Atlanta Braves (1978–1981); Toronto Blue Jays (1982–1985); Atlanta Braves (1990–2010); As coach: New York Yankees (1977)

Career highlights and awards
- 2× World Series champion (1977, 1995); 4× Manager of the Year (1985, 1991, 2004, 2005); Atlanta Braves No. 6 retired; Braves Hall of Fame

Member of the National

Baseball Hall of Fame
- Induction: 2014
- Vote: 100%
- Election method: Expansion Era Committee

Robert Joe Cox (May 21, 1941 – May 9, 2026) was an American professional baseball player and manager. He played as a third baseman in Major League Baseball (MLB) for the New York Yankees and managed for the Atlanta Braves and Toronto Blue Jays. He is a member of the National Baseball Hall of Fame. He recorded a 100-win season six times, a record matched only by Joe McCarthy.

Cox first managed the Braves from 1978 to 1981, and then managed the Blue Jays from 1982 to 1985. He rejoined the Braves in 1986 as a general manager. He moved back to the manager's role during the 1990 season and stayed there until his retirement following the 2010 season. Cox led the Atlanta Braves to 14 consecutive division championships from 1991 to 2005, (interrupted in 1994 when the Montreal Expos were leading the division by 6 games when a strike ended the season), which included a World Series title in 1995. The Braves retired No. 6 in his honor.

Cox holds the all-time record for ejections in MLB with 162, a record previously held by John McGraw. He also is the all-time leader among MLB managers in playoff seasons with 16, and he was the first manager since Casey Stengel to have qualified for the postseason 10 times (four managers have since followed him).

== Playing career ==
Cox originally signed with the Los Angeles Dodgers in 1959, and bounced around the Dodgers, Chicago Cubs, and Braves minor league systems for seven seasons. The Braves traded Cox to the New York Yankees for Bob Tillman and Dale Roberts on December 7, 1967. Cox finally made it to the majors in 1968, batting .229 with 7 home runs and 41 RBIs in 135 games at third base for the Yankees. Knee injuries limited Cox to 85 games for the Yankess in 1969. The Yankees assigned Cox to the Triple-A Syracuse Chiefs for the 1970 season, ending his time in the Majors. Cox also played from 1967 to 1970 for the Cardenales de Lara and Leones del Caracas of the Venezuelan Winter League.

== Managerial career ==
=== New York Yankees farm system ===
Cox began his managerial career in the Yankees farm system in 1971 with the Class-A Fort Lauderdale Yankees. He was promoted to the AA West Haven Yankees in 1972 and to AAA Syracuse in 1973. In 1976, he led Chiefs to the International League championship. Cox also managed his former Winter Leagure former club, Cardenales in the Venezuelan Winter League, from 1974 to 1977. He then spent the 1977 season as the first base coach on Billy Martin's staff with the World Series–winning Yankees.

=== Atlanta Braves (1978–1981) ===
Cox replaced Dave Bristol as the manager of the Atlanta Braves prior to the 1978 season, inheriting a team that had finished last in the National League West during the previous two seasons and, in 1977, compiled a worse record than the first-year Seattle Mariners of the American League. Building from the ground up, the Braves finished last in both 1978 and 1979. Entering 1980, Cox made one of the unusual moves for which he is known, moving power-hitting first baseman–catcher Dale Murphy, who had developed a throwing block as a catcher that hindered his ability to play, to center field. Murphy later won two National League Most Valuable Player Awards and five Gold Gloves, and became one of the premier players of the 1980s. In 1980, the Braves finished fourth with their first record above .500 (81–80) since 1974.

During the 1981 season, which was shortened by a strike, the Braves finished in fourth place during the first half and in fifth in the second. After the season, Atlanta owner Ted Turner fired him. Asked at a press conference who was on his short list for manager, Turner replied, "It would be Bobby Cox if I hadn't just fired him. We need someone like him around here." Under Cox's successor, future Hall-of-Fame manager Joe Torre, the Braves won the National League West division title in 1982 and finished second in both 1983 and 1984. Cox finished his first tenure with the Braves with a 266–323 record.

=== Toronto Blue Jays (1982–1985) ===
The Toronto Blue Jays hired Cox as their manager in 1982, and they steadily improved over the four years of his management. In 1983, Cox led the Blue Jays to the first winning record in franchise history. In 1984, he led the team to an 89–73–1 record and second-place finish in the AL East. In 1985, Cox's fourth season with the club, the Blue Jays finished in first place in the American League East, the franchise's first division title. That season, the American League Championship Series was expanded to a best-of-seven format after 16 seasons of a best-of-five format. This change ultimately made the difference, as the Blue Jays leading three games to one to the Kansas City Royals, lost three straight games to drop the series. The decision by Kansas City manager Dick Howser to counter Cox's platooning by starting a right-handed pitcher before going with left-handed relievers in the middle innings proving key.

After the 1985 season, the Braves asked for permission to interview Cox for their general manager position. On October 22, 1985, Cox left Toronto to return to Atlanta as general manager; he stated that a key reason was to be closer to his family, who had continued to live in suburban Marietta, Georgia. Cox and incoming manager Chuck Tanner both received five-year contracts from Turner. Cox finished his stint as Jays manager with a 355–292 record.

=== Atlanta Braves (1986–2010) ===
==== General manager ====
After going through two managers over the course of less than five years with disastrous results in attendance and performance, Cox fired Russ Nixon in June 1990 and named himself field manager. Cox had spent the prior four seasons accumulating talented players, including Tom Glavine, Steve Avery, John Smoltz, Ron Gant, and David Justice. He was also responsible for drafting Chipper Jones with the first overall pick in the 1990 draft. After the 1990 season, Cox handed the general manager's post to Kansas City Royals general manager John Schuerholz.

==== 1991 ====
In 1991, the Braves, along with the Minnesota Twins, became the first teams to go from last place to first place from one year to the next. The two teams met in the 1991 World Series, which the Twins won in seven games.

==== 1992–1994 ====
In 1992, Cox's Braves held a 3–1 lead in the National League Championship Series against the Pittsburgh Pirates before losing Games 5 and 6, however most importantly they did win Game 7 on Francisco Cabrera's ninth-inning, two-out, pinch-hit, two-run single. They went on to lose the World Series to Cox's former club, the Blue Jays. In 1993, the Braves had the best record in baseball after a pennant race where they overcame a 10-game deficit in August to beat the San Francisco Giants. By going 51–17 over the last two and a half months of the season, they won the division by a game. However, they lost the National League Championship Series in six games to the Philadelphia Phillies.

In the 1994 strike-shortened season, Cox led the team to a 68–46 record, which finished second in the NL East at the finish of the season.

==== 1995–1996 ====
In 1995, the Atlanta Braves won Cox's only World Series championship as a manager, over the Cleveland Indians.

In May 1995, Cox was arrested on simple battery charge after his wife called police and alleged Cox struck her. She retracted the statement the following day, and the charges were dropped after the couple attended court-ordered counseling.

In 1996, the Braves finished 96–66 and again won the NL East. After sweeping the Los Angeles Dodgers in the division series, the Braves fell behind the St. Louis Cardinals, three games to one in the 1996 National League Championship Series. Facing elimination, the Braves offense outscored the Cardinals 33–1 over the final three games and won the pennant. Cox became the only manager in history to lose a series leading three games to one and win a series trailing three games to one. The scoring continued into the first two games against the New York Yankees as the Braves took a two games to none lead by winning with scores of 12–1 and 4–0 in the World Series. In game four, the Braves led 6–0 in the fourth inning, but the Yankees came from behind. Jim Leyritz homered to tie the game, and the Yankees tied the series with a win in 11 innings, 8–6. The Yankees would ultimately win in six games. Cox was ejected in Game 6; he was the most recent person to be ejected in a World Series game until Dave Martinez in 2019 in Game 6 against the Houston Astros.

==== 1997–2001 ====
In the 1997 season, the Braves finished with a 101–61 record and won the NL East. The Braves defeated the Houston Astros in a three-game sweep in the NLDS. The Braves lost to the Florida Marlins in the 1997 NLCS.

In the 1998 season, the Braves finished with a 106–56 record and won the NL East. In the NLDS, the Braves swept the Chicago Cubs in three games. The Braves lost in six games to the San Diego Padres in the 1998 NLCS.

In the 1999 season, the Braves went 103–59 and won the NL East. The Braves made it back to the World Series in 1999, but lost to the defending World Series Champion New York Yankees in four straight games.

In the 2000 season, Cox led the team to a 95–67 record and another NL East title. The Braves were swept in the NLDS 3–0 by the St. Louis Cardinals.

Cox's 2001 team went 88–74 and won the NL East and upset the favored Houston Astros in three straight games in the division series. However, the Arizona Diamondbacks defeated the Braves in five games in the NLCS. In 2001, Cox tied a record held by John McGraw, Bill Dahlen, and Paul Richards by being ejected from eleven games in a single season.

==== 2002–2010 ====
In the 2002 season, the Braves went 101–59–1, won the NL East, and led the wild card San Francisco Giants 2 games to 1 before dropping the last two.

In the 2003 season, the Braves went 101–61 and won the NL East. The Braves pushed the Chicago Cubs to the fifth game before being eliminated 3–2.

In the 2004 season, the Braves finished with a 96–66 record and won the NL East. The following year, the Braves lost in the best-of-five Division Series for the third straight year.

In the 2005 season, the Braves finished with a 90–72 record and won the NL East. The Braves lost to the Houston Astros, with the finale taking 18 innings to decide in the 2005 NLDS.

In the 2006 season, the Braves finished with a 79–83 record, ending their streak of NL East titles. In the 2007 season, the Braves finished with an 84–78 record, but finished third in the NL East missing the postseason. In the 2008 season, the Braves finished with a 72–90 record, their worst record as a franchise since 1990.

On September 23, 2009, Cox signed a one-year contract extension through 2010, and on the same day announced that 2010 would be his final year as manager. He also announced that he agreed to stay on as an advisor for team baseball operations for the next five years after he retires. The Braves went 86–76 in 2009 but finished third in the NL East missing the postseason.

In the 2010 season, the Braves went 91–71 and finished second in the NL East, which qualified them for the playoffs. On October 2, 2010, the Atlanta Braves honored Bobby Cox at Turner Field in a sold-out game. On October 3, 2010, Cox led the Braves to an 8–7 win over the Phillies and clinched both his and the Braves' first wild card. His final game was on October 11, 2010, when the Braves were eliminated by the San Francisco Giants in Game 4 of the National League Division Series. He was given a standing ovation by the crowd and both teams immediately following the game. He finished with a record of 1,883 wins and 1,386 losses in the regular season and 64 wins and 65 losses in the post-season. His record from both stints as manager is 2,149 wins and 1,709 losses for a .557 winning percentage in 3,858 games. His overall managerial record is 2,504 wins and 2,001 losses in the regular season and 67 wins and 69 losses in the post-season.

=== Managerial record ===
Team	Year	Regular season					Postseason			
Team	Year	Games	Won	Lost	Win %	Finish	Won	Lost	Win %	Result
ATL	1978	162	69	93	.426	6th in NL West	–	–	–	–
ATL	1979	160	66	94	.413	6th in NL West	–	–	–	–
ATL	1980	161	81	80	.503	4th in NL West	–	–	–	–
ATL	1981	54	25	29	.463	4th in NL West	–	–	–	–
ATL	1981	52	25	27	.481	5th in NL West	–	–	–	–
TOR	1982	162	78	84	.481	6th in AL East	–	–	–	–
TOR	1983	162	89	73	.549	4th in AL East	–	–	–	–
TOR	1984	162	89	73	.549	2nd in AL East	–	–	–	–
TOR	1985	161	99	62	.615	1st in AL East	3	4	.429	Lost ALCS (KC)
TOR total		647	355	292	.549		3	4	.429	
ATL	1990	97	40	57	.412	6th in NL West	–	–	–	–
ATL	1991	162	94	68	.580	1st in NL West	7	7	.500	Lost World Series (MIN)
ATL	1992	162	98	64	.605	1st in NL West	6	7	.462	Lost World Series (TOR)
ATL	1993	162	104	58	.642	1st in NL West	2	4	.333	Lost NLCS (PHI)
ATL	1994	114	68	46	.596	2nd in NL East	–	–	–	–
ATL	1995	144	90	54	.625	1st in NL East	11	3	.786	Won World Series (CLE)
ATL	1996	162	96	66	.593	1st in NL East	9	7	.563	Lost World Series (NYY)
ATL	1997	162	101	61	.623	1st in NL East	5	4	.556	Lost NLCS (FLA)
ATL	1998	162	106	56	.654	1st in NL East	5	4	.556	Lost NLCS (SD)
ATL	1999	162	103	59	.636	1st in NL East	7	7	.500	Lost World Series (NYY)
ATL	2000	162	95	67	.586	1st in NL East	0	3	.000	Lost NLDS (STL)
ATL	2001	162	88	74	.543	1st in NL East	4	4	.500	Lost NLCS (ARI)
ATL	2002	160	101	59	.631	1st in NL East	2	3	.400	Lost NLDS (SF)
ATL	2003	162	101	61	.623	1st in NL East	2	3	.400	Lost NLDS (CHC)
ATL	2004	162	96	66	.593	1st in NL East	2	3	.400	Lost NLDS (HOU)
ATL	2005	162	90	72	.556	1st in NL East	1	3	.250	Lost NLDS (HOU)
ATL	2006	162	79	83	.488	3rd in NL East	–	–	–	–
ATL	2007	162	84	78	.519	3rd in NL East	–	–	–	–
ATL	2008	162	72	90	.444	4th in NL East	–	–	–	–
ATL	2009	162	86	76	.531	3rd in NL East	–	–	–	–
ATL	2010	162	91	71	.562	2nd in NL East	1	3	.250	Lost NLDS (SF)
ATL total		3858	2149	1709	.557		64	65	.496	
Total		4505	2504	2001	.556		67	69	.493	

== Personal life and death ==
Robert Joe Cox was born in Tulsa, Oklahoma, on May 21, 1941. He grew up in Selma, California, near Fresno.

Cox was first married to Mary Xavier from 1961 to 1977. Together they had five children. The marriage ended in divorce. Cox was then married to Pamela Boswell and they had three daughters together. In 1995, Cox was arrested on battery charges against his wife. His wife retracted the allegation and after Cox completed anger management counseling, the charges were dismissed.

One day after participating in the Braves' home opening day (April 1, 2019) festivities, Cox was hospitalized after suffering a stroke. Five months after his stroke, Cox made a visit to SunTrust Park on September 2, 2019, to watch the Braves play the Toronto Blue Jays, a game which the Braves won 6–3. As a result of the stroke, Cox suffered from paralysis in his right arm which required it to be in a sling. The stroke did not cause cognitive impairment, as Cox followed and retained interest in baseball, receiving regular visits with long-time baseball colleagues such as Braves manager Brian Snitker, but caused some difficulties communicating. He was diagnosed with congestive heart failure in 2020. Cox attended the July 6, 2024, Atlanta Braves game versus the visiting, division-leading Philadelphia Phillies, his first in-person attendance at a Braves game since 2019. Cox visited the home clubhouse, met with Braves players, and took a group photo. He was shown on the videoboard before the fourth inning to a standing ovation.

Due to poor health, Cox was unable to attend the 2025 All-Star Game, the first held in Atlanta since he managed the National League in the 2000 All-Star Game. Before the game, tributes were paid to him in the media by his former players.

Cox died in Marietta, Georgia, on May 9, 2026, at the age of 84. He died three days after the death of the former Atlanta Braves owner Ted Turner.

== Accomplishments ==
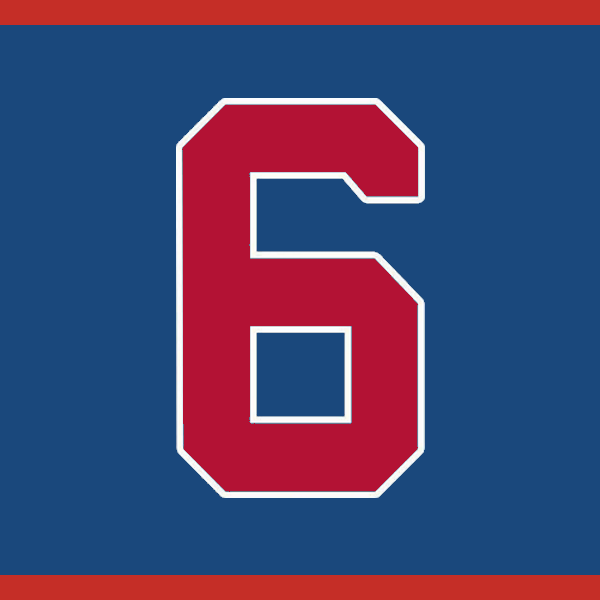
Bobby Cox's number 6 was retired by the Atlanta Braves in 2011.

Cox was named Manager of the Year four times (1985, 1991, 2004, 2005) and is one of four managers to have won the award in both the American and National League. He and Kevin Cash are the only managers to have won the award in consecutive years. Cox was also named Manager of the Year by The Sporting News eight times (1985, 1991, 1993, 1999, 2002, 2003, 2004, and 2005).

On May 12, 2007, Cox passed Sparky Anderson to become the fourth-winningest manager in major league history, with a record of 2,195 wins and 1,698 losses. He led the Braves to a division title every season from 1991 to 2005, excluding the strike-shortened 1994 season; the Braves have competed in the National League East since 1994 and competed in the National League West prior to that. He won a World Series Championship in 1995. In 2001, he took sole possession of first place for most wins as a manager in Braves history. Cox's .561 winning percentage is fourteenth in all-time among managers with at least 1,000 games managed, and is the second highest among those who managed the majority of their career after the creation of divisions within each league in 1969. On June 8, 2009, Cox won his 2,000th game with the Atlanta Braves, becoming the fourth manager in Major League history to accomplish that feat with one team. Cox reached career win number 2,500 on September 25, 2010, becoming the fourth manager in Major League history to do so.

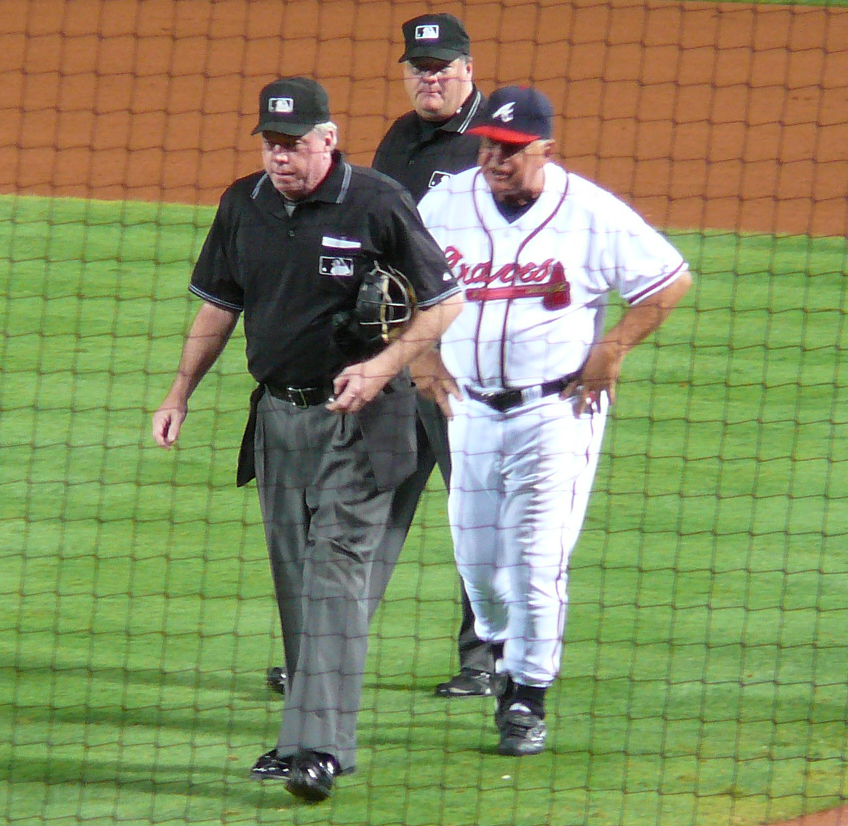
Bobby Cox following an ejection from a game in September 2009.

On September 17, 2010, Cox was ejected for the 158th time in his Major League coaching career during the second inning of a Braves game against the New York Mets; he holds the all-time record for most ejections (set on August 14, 2007, with his 132nd), previously held by John McGraw. Coincidentally, his first ejection happened while managing the Braves in a game against the Mets on May 1, 1978. Unlike McGraw, Cox did not have a reputation for having a fiery temper and Cox generally only got ejected to prevent his players from being ejected. He developed a reputation for being fiercely protective of his players, but unlike other frequently ejected managers such as Earl Weaver, it was never seen as personal when he threw himself between his players and an umpire, and there were no grudges held between Cox and the umpires who ejected him. One umpire who ejected Cox multiple times was even quoted as saying that if he were a player, he'd want to play for Cox. In the 158 games from which Cox was ejected, his teams had a winning percentage of .385. In a July 2006 game, Cox was unable to save outfielder Jeff Francoeur from ejection; speaking with Atlanta Journal-Constitution beat writer David O'Brien, Francoeur recounted his manager's advice after both men had been sent to the Braves clubhouse:

"I'm like, 'What do I do?' He said, 'Go have a couple cold beers and get in the cold tub or something and relax. And then you'll probably have to write a $500 check. Or you can do what I do, write a $10,000 one and tell them when it runs out, let me know'."

Cox is also the only person to be ejected from two World Series games (1992 and 1996). He was ejected in the ninth inning of Game 3 of the 1992 World Series for throwing a batting helmet onto the field at the SkyDome. Cox was trying to slam the helmet against the lip of the dugout and missed, throwing it onto the field. Cox was tossed again in the final game of the 1996 World Series after protesting an out call of Marquis Grissom attempting to take second base on a passed ball. Although video replays appeared to show Grissom was safe, umpire Terry Tata called him out, and Cox was tossed in the ensuing argument.

In 1981, Cox was inducted into the Fresno County Athletic Hall of Fame.

On August 12, 2011, a luncheon was held by the Braves, and Cox was inducted into the Atlanta Braves Hall of Fame and his number six jersey was retired. Afterward, an on-field ceremony was held that recognized the long-time Braves manager prior to the scheduled game versus the Chicago Cubs.

Cox was unanimously elected to the Baseball Hall of Fame by the 16-member Veterans Committee on December 9, 2013. The ceremony was held on July 27, 2014.

Cox was hired on September 22, 2014, to return on a part-time basis to help the Atlanta Braves choose their next general manager and director of player development after the dismissal of general manager Frank Wren and player personnel director Bruce Manno.

In 2019, the International League announced that Cox would be inducted into its Hall of Fame, noting especially his managerial experience with the Chiefs.

== See also ==
- List of Major League Baseball managers with most career ejections
- List of Major League Baseball managers with most career wins

Awards and achievements
Preceded by John McGraw	All time MLB ejections 161	Succeeded by Incumbent
