= 1984 Major League Baseball postseason =

1984 Major League Baseball playoffs

Tournament details
- Dates: October 2–14, 1984
- Teams: 4

Final positions
- Champions: Detroit Tigers (4th title)
- Runners-up: San Diego Padres

Tournament statistics
- Games played: 13
- Attendance: 655,603 (50,431 per game)
- Best BA: Alan Trammell (DET) (.419)
- Most HRs: Kirk Gibson & Alan Trammell (DET) (3)
- Most SBs: Kirk Gibson (DET) (4)
- Best ERA: Dave Dravecky & Craig Lefferts (SD) (0.00)
- Most Ks (as pitcher): Jack Morris (DET) (17)

Awards
- MVP: Alan Trammell (DET)

The 1984 Major League Baseball postseason was the playoff tournament of Major League Baseball for the 1984 season. The winners of each division advance to the postseason and face each other in a League Championship Series to determine the pennant winners that face each other in the World Series.

In the American League, the Detroit Tigers returned to the postseason for the first time since 1972, and the Kansas City Royals returned to the postseason for the sixth time in nine years.

In the National League, the Chicago Cubs were making their first postseason appearance since 1945, ending the longest postseason appearance drought in the league. Joining the Cubs were the San Diego Padres, who made their first postseason appearance in franchise history. This was San Diego’s last postseason appearance until 1996.

The playoffs began on October 2, 1984, and concluded on October 14, 1984, with the Tigers defeating the Padres in five games in the 1984 World Series. This was the first title since 1968 for the Tigers and their fourth overall.

== Teams ==
American League Teams National League Teams

The following teams qualified for the postseason:

=== American League ===
- Detroit Tigers – 104–58, AL East champions
- Kansas City Royals – 84–78, AL West champions

=== National League ===
- Chicago Cubs – 96–65, NL East champions
- San Diego Padres – 92–70, NL West champions

== Playoff bracket ==
League Championship Series (ALCS, NLCS)
East	Detroit	3
West	Kansas City	0
East	Chicago Cubs	2
West	San Diego	3

World Series
AL	Detroit	4
NL	San Diego	1

== American League Championship Series ==
=== Detroit Tigers vs. Kansas City Royals ===
Detroit won the series, 3–0.

Game	Date	Score	Location	Time	Attendance
1	October 2	Detroit Tigers – 8, Kansas City Royals – 1	Royals Stadium	2:42	41,973
2	October 3	Detroit Tigers – 5, Kansas City Royals – 3 (11)	Royals Stadium	3:37	42,019
3	October 5	Kansas City Royals – 0, Detroit Tigers – 1	Tiger Stadium	2:39	52,168

The Tigers swept the Royals to return to the World Series for the first time since 1968, ending a 16-year conference championship drought for Detroit-based teams.

Jack Morris pitched seven solid innings and the AL MVP and AL Cy Young winning closer Willie Hernández pitched two shutout innings in relief as the Tigers blew out the Royals in Game 1 on the road. In Game 2, the Tigers held a 3–2 lead going into the bottom of the eighth, but Hernández surrendered the tying run as Hal McRae tied the game with an RBI double. However, the Tigers still prevailed as "Senor Smoke", Aurelio López, held the Royals scoreless in the ninth, tenth and eleventh innings, and Johnny Grubb hit a two-run RBI double off Dan Quisenberry in the top of the eleventh inning to drive in Darrell Evans and Ruppert Jones for the game winning runs. When the series shifted to Detroit for Game 3, the Royals' Charlie Leibrandt pitched a complete game, but it wasn't enough as the Tigers won 1–0, off an RBI single from Marty Castillo which drove in Chet Lemon. This was the last time the Tigers won the AL pennant while playing at Tiger Stadium, as well as the first time that the Tigers ever swept a postseason series. This was the last time the Tigers defeated a team from their current division (the American League Central) in the postseason until 2025.

The Royals would return to the ALCS the next year, and defeated the Toronto Blue Jays in seven games en route to a World Series title after falling behind 3–1 in the series.

The Tigers returned to the ALCS in 1987, but were upset by the eventual World Series champion Minnesota Twins in five games. The Tigers’ next pennant would come in 2006 over the Oakland Athletics in a sweep before falling in the World Series.

== National League Championship Series ==
=== San Diego Padres vs. Chicago Cubs ===
San Diego won the series, 3–2.

Game	Date	Score	Location	Time	Attendance
1	October 2	San Diego Padres – 0, Chicago Cubs – 13	Wrigley Field	2:49	36,282
2	October 3	San Diego Padres – 2, Chicago Cubs – 4	Wrigley Field	2:18	36,282
3	October 4	Chicago Cubs – 1, San Diego Padres – 7	Jack Murphy Stadium	2:19	58,346
4	October 6	Chicago Cubs – 5, San Diego Padres – 7	Jack Murphy Stadium	3:13	58,354
5	October 7	Chicago Cubs – 3, San Diego Padres – 6	Jack Murphy Stadium	2:41	58,359

This was the first postseason meeting between the Cubs and Padres. The Padres overcame a two-games-to-none series deficit to defeat the Cubs in five games, advancing to the World Series for the first time in franchise history (in the process denying a rematch of the 1945 World Series between the Tigers and Cubs).

At first, it appeared as if this series would go Chicago's way. Rick Sutcliffe pitched seven innings of shutout ball as the Cubs blew out the Padres by a staggering 13–0 score in Game 1, handing the Padres their worst postseason loss ever. Steve Trout pitched eight solid innings as the Cubs won by two runs to take a 2–0 series lead headed to San Diego, and looked poised to win their first NL pennant in 39 years. However, the Padres responded. Ed Whitson stymied the Cubs’ offense in Game 3 as the Padres prevailed in a blowout to win their first postseason game in franchise history. Game 4 was a back-and-forth shootout between both teams, which was won by the Padres as Steve Garvey hit a walk-off two run homer in the bottom of the ninth to force a decisive fifth game. In Game 5, the Cubs led 3-0 going into the bottom of the sixth, but the Padres rallied with six unanswered runs across the sixth and seventh to take the lead for good, in part thanks to an error by Chicago’s Leon Durham in the bottom of the seventh, and clinched their first NL pennant.

Due to the Padres clinching the pennant, the Cubs’ collapse in the 1984 NLCS entered baseball lore as part of the Curse of the Billy Goat superstition used to explain the Cubs’ pennant drought since 1945 and championship drought since 1908. This was the first of four consecutive losses in the NLCS for the Cubs. In 1989 the Cubs fell to the San Francisco Giants in five games. In 2003, the Cubs blew a 3–1 series lead to the eventual World Series champion Florida Marlins after being five outs away from the pennant in Game 6. Then in 2015, they were swept by the New York Mets. The Cubs would eventually win the pennant again in 2016 over the Los Angeles Dodgers in six games en route to a World Series title.

Additionally, the series is notable for being the final LCS in which day games would be mandatory in at least one of the two venues, as Wrigley Field would not add lights until the 1988 season. Occasional day games in the LCS would continue, mostly in order to avoid conflicts for television broadcasts of two games in the same day. However, the Cubs have not played an NLCS day game at Wrigley since 1984.

The Padres became the first team to reach the World Series in their postseason debut since the New York Mets did so in the inaugural postseason in 1969. The Padres would win their next and most recent pennant in 1998 over the Atlanta Braves in six games before falling in the World Series.

Both teams would meet again over four decades later in the Wild Card round in 2025 and 2026, with the Cubs winning the former and the Padres winning the latter.

== 1984 World Series ==
=== Detroit Tigers (AL) vs. San Diego Padres (NL) ===
Detroit won the series, 4–1.

Game	Date	Score	Location	Time	Attendance
1	October 9	Detroit Tigers – 3, San Diego Padres – 2	Jack Murphy Stadium	3:18	57,908
2	October 10	Detroit Tigers – 3, San Diego Padres – 5	Jack Murphy Stadium	2:44	57,911
3	October 12	San Diego Padres – 2, Detroit Tigers – 5	Tiger Stadium	3:11	51,970
4	October 13	San Diego Padres – 2, Detroit Tigers – 4	Tiger Stadium	2:20	52,130
5	October 14	San Diego Padres – 4, Detroit Tigers – 8	Tiger Stadium	2:55	51,901

The Tigers defeated the Padres in five games to win their first championship since 1968, ending a 16-year championship drought for not just the Tigers, but the city of Detroit in general.

In San Diego, the Tigers took Game 1 off a complete game performance from Jack Morris. In Game 2, the Tigers held a 3–2 lead after the top of the fifth, but Kurt Bevacqua won the game for the Padres with a three-run home run off Tigers' starting pitcher Dan Petry, evening the series headed to Detroit. Game 2 remains the only World Series game won by the Padres. In Game 3, the Tigers jumped out to a big lead early and maintained it, as Willie Hernández shut out the Padres in the final two innings to give the Tigers a 5–2 victory and the series lead. Morris pitched yet another complete game in Game 4 as the Tigers won to take a 3–1 series lead. Game 5 was an offensive slugfest which was won by the Tigers as they clinched the title with a series-sealing three-run home run by Kirk Gibson in the bottom of the eighth. Game 5 was the last World Series game ever played at Tiger Stadium.

The Padres would make one more trip to the World Series in 1998, but were swept by the New York Yankees, becoming the first victim of a Yankees three-peat from 1998 to 2000.

The 1984 Tigers were the last team to win the World Series after sweeping the LCS and with their opponent clinching the pennant in a winner-take-all game until the Los Angeles Dodgers in 2025, and are the only American League team to accomplish this feat. The Tigers would return to the World Series in 2006, but were shockingly upset by an 83-win St. Louis Cardinals team in five games. The Tigers currently hold the seventh longest championship drought in the majors.

== Broadcasting ==
ABC televised both LCS nationally in the United States. This was the first year that both LCS would exclusively air on a national network, as each team's local broadcaster was no longer allowed to also televise coverage of the games. NBC then aired the World Series.
