= 1984 Major League Baseball season =

1984 MLB season
- League: American League (AL); National League (NL)
- Sport: Baseball
- Duration: Regular season: April 2 – September 30, 1984; Postseason: October 2–14, 1984
- Games: 162
- Teams: 26 (14 AL, 12 NL)
- TV partner(s): ABC, NBC

Draft
- Top draft pick: Shawn Abner
- Picked by: New York Mets

Regular season
- Season MVP: NL: Ryne Sandberg (CHC); AL: Willie Hernández (DET)

Postseason
- AL champions: Detroit Tigers
- AL runners-up: Kansas City Royals
- NL champions: San Diego Padres
- NL runners-up: Chicago Cubs

World Series
- Champions: Detroit Tigers
- Runners-up: San Diego Padres
- World Series MVP: Alan Trammell (DET)

MLB seasons
- ← 1983 1985 →

Locations of teams for the 1982–1988 American League seasons
West East
Locations of teams for the 1977–1992 National League seasons
West East

The 1984 major league baseball season began on April 2 while the regular season ended on September 30. The postseason began on October 2. The 81st World Series then began on October 9 and concluded on October 14 with the Detroit Tigers of the American League defeating the San Diego Padres of the National League, four games to one, to win their fourth title in franchise history.

The 55th All-Star Game was held on July 10 at Candlestick Park, home of the San Francisco Giants. The National League won, 3–1.

== New commissioner ==
On March 3, 1984, Peter Ueberroth was elected by the owners as the sixth Commissioner of Baseball (replacing retiring commissioner Bowie Kuhn) and officially took office on October 1 of that year. As a condition of his hiring, Ueberroth increased the commissioner's fining ability from US$5,000 to $250,000 (equivalent to $15,500 and $775,000 in 2025, respectively). His salary was raised to a reported $450,000 (equivalent to $1,395,000 in 2025), nearly twice what Kuhn was paid.

Just as Ueberroth was taking office, the Major League Umpires Association (MLUA) was threatening to strike the postseason. Ueberroth managed to arbitrate the disagreement and had the umpires back to work before the League Championship Series were over.

== Schedule ==
The 1984 schedule consisted of 162 games for all 14 teams in the American League and 12 teams in the National League. Both leagues saw different schedule formats, as they had since 1977. The American League was split into two seven-team divisions. Each team was scheduled to play 13 games against their six division rivals, totaling 78 games, and 12 games against seven opponents, totaling 84 interdivision games. This format, used since 1979 would be used until the league realigned into three division for the 1994 season. Meanwhile, the National League was split into two six-team divisions. Each team was scheduled to play 18 games against their five division rivals, totaling 90 games, and 12 games against six interdivision opponents, totaling 72 games. This continued the format put in place since the 1969, and like the American League, would continue to be the format in use until 1993.

Opening Day took place on April 2, featuring six teams. The final day of the scheduled regular season was on October 2, featuring all 26 teams. The National League Championship Series took place between October 2 and October 7, while the American League Championship Series took place between October 2 and October 5. The World Series took place between October 9 and October 14.

== Rule changes ==
The 1984 season saw the following rule changes:

- To avoid the issues that are arose due to the 1983 Pine Tar Incident, a batter found to use a material or substance on the baseball bat only during or after it had been used in a play, will not be declared out, or ejected.
- Rules regarding the player uniform were updated:
  - No uniforms can show patches or designs relating to commercial advertisements.
  - If a team adopts a player having their name on their shirt, all players on the team must have their name as well.
  - For a name that is not the player's last name to be shown on their uniform, the League President must approve.
- Rain checks will not be honored for any game that can be considered a regulation game.
- Terminology referencing a batter being called out for illegal action was changed from "He hits and illegally batted ball" to "He hits a ball with one or both feet on the ground entirely outside the batter's box."
- On-base percentage was made an official statistic.
- The 15-day disabled list was expanded so that teams could place not just one, but two players on the list, and a pitcher could now be added.

== Teams ==
League	Division	Team	City	Ballpark	Capacity	Manager
American League	East	Baltimore Orioles	Baltimore, Maryland	Baltimore Memorial Stadium	52,860	Joe Altobelli
American League	East	Boston Red Sox	Boston, Massachusetts	Fenway Park	33,538	Ralph Houk
American League	East	Cleveland Indians	Cleveland, Ohio	Cleveland Stadium	74,483	Pat Corrales
American League	East	Detroit Tigers	Detroit, Michigan	Tiger Stadium	52,806	Sparky Anderson
American League	East	Milwaukee Brewers	Milwaukee, Wisconsin	Milwaukee County Stadium	53,192	Rene Lachemann
American League	East	New York Yankees	New York, New York	Yankee Stadium	57,545	Yogi Berra
American League	East	Toronto Blue Jays	Toronto, Ontario	Exhibition Stadium	43,737	Bobby Cox
American League	West	California Angels	Anaheim, California	Anaheim Stadium	64,573	John McNamara
American League	West	Chicago White Sox	Chicago, Illinois	Comiskey Park	44,492	Tony La Russa
American League	West	Kansas City Royals	Kansas City, Missouri	Royals Stadium	40,613	Dick Howser
American League	West	Minnesota Twins	Minneapolis, Minnesota	Hubert H. Humphrey Metrodome	54,711	Billy Gardner
American League	West	Oakland Athletics	Oakland, California	Oakland–Alameda County Coliseum	50,000	Steve Boros
American League	West	Oakland Athletics	Oakland, California	Oakland–Alameda County Coliseum	50,000	Jackie Moore
American League	West	Seattle Mariners	Seattle, Washington	Kingdome	59,438	Del Crandall
American League	West	Seattle Mariners	Seattle, Washington	Kingdome	59,438	Chuck Cottier
American League	West	Texas Rangers	Arlington, Texas	Arlington Stadium	41,284	Doug Rader
National League	East	Chicago Cubs	Chicago, Illinois	Wrigley Field	37,702	Jim Frey
National League	East	Montreal Expos	Montreal, Quebec	Olympic Stadium	59,149	Bill Virdon
National League	East	Montreal Expos	Montreal, Quebec	Olympic Stadium	59,149	Jim Fanning
National League	East	New York Mets	New York, New York	Shea Stadium	55,300	Davey Johnson
National League	East	Philadelphia Phillies	Philadelphia, Pennsylvania	Veterans Stadium	62,382	Paul Owens
National League	East	Pittsburgh Pirates	Pittsburgh, Pennsylvania	Three Rivers Stadium	58,336	Chuck Tanner
National League	East	St. Louis Cardinals	St. Louis, Missouri	Busch Stadium	50,222	Whitey Herzog
National League	West	Atlanta Braves	Atlanta, Georgia	Atlanta–Fulton County Stadium	52,785	Joe Torre
National League	West	Cincinnati Reds	Cincinnati, Ohio	Riverfront Stadium	52,953	Vern Rapp
National League	West	Cincinnati Reds	Cincinnati, Ohio	Riverfront Stadium	52,953	Pete Rose
National League	West	Houston Astros	Houston, Texas	Houston Astrodome	47,000	Bob Lillis
National League	West	Los Angeles Dodgers	Los Angeles, California	Dodger Stadium	56,000	Tommy Lasorda
National League	West	San Diego Padres	San Diego, California	Jack Murphy Stadium	59,022	Dick Williams
National League	West	San Francisco Giants	San Francisco, California	Candlestick Park	58,495	Frank Robinson
National League	West	San Francisco Giants	San Francisco, California	Candlestick Park	58,495	Danny Ozark

== Standings ==
=== American League ===
AL East
Team	W	L	Pct.	GB	Home	Road
Detroit Tigers	104	58	.642	—	53‍–‍29	51‍–‍29
Toronto Blue Jays	89	73	.549	15	49‍–‍32	40‍–‍41
New York Yankees	87	75	.537	17	51‍–‍30	36‍–‍45
Boston Red Sox	86	76	.531	18	41‍–‍40	45‍–‍36
Baltimore Orioles	85	77	.525	19	44‍–‍37	41‍–‍40
Cleveland Indians	75	87	.463	29	41‍–‍39	34‍–‍48
Milwaukee Brewers	67	94	.416	36½	38‍–‍43	29‍–‍51

AL West
Team	W	L	Pct.	GB	Home	Road
Kansas City Royals	84	78	.519	—	44‍–‍37	40‍–‍41
California Angels	81	81	.500	3	37‍–‍44	44‍–‍37
Minnesota Twins	81	81	.500	3	47‍–‍34	34‍–‍47
Oakland Athletics	77	85	.475	7	44‍–‍37	33‍–‍48
Chicago White Sox	74	88	.457	10	43‍–‍38	31‍–‍50
Seattle Mariners	74	88	.457	10	42‍–‍39	32‍–‍49
Texas Rangers	69	92	.429	14½	34‍–‍46	35‍–‍46

=== National League ===
NL East
Team	W	L	Pct.	GB	Home	Road
Chicago Cubs	96	65	.596	—	51‍–‍29	45‍–‍36
New York Mets	90	72	.556	6½	48‍–‍33	42‍–‍39
St. Louis Cardinals	84	78	.519	12½	44‍–‍37	40‍–‍41
Philadelphia Phillies	81	81	.500	15½	39‍–‍42	42‍–‍39
Montreal Expos	78	83	.484	18	39‍–‍42	39‍–‍41
Pittsburgh Pirates	75	87	.463	21½	41‍–‍40	34‍–‍47

NL West
Team	W	L	Pct.	GB	Home	Road
San Diego Padres	92	70	.568	—	48‍–‍33	44‍–‍37
Atlanta Braves	80	82	.494	12	38‍–‍43	42‍–‍39
Houston Astros	80	82	.494	12	43‍–‍38	37‍–‍44
Los Angeles Dodgers	79	83	.488	13	40‍–‍41	39‍–‍42
Cincinnati Reds	70	92	.432	22	39‍–‍42	31‍–‍50
San Francisco Giants	66	96	.407	26	35‍–‍46	31‍–‍50

=== Tie game ===
1 tie game (1 in AL, 0 in NL), which are not factored into winning percentage or games behind (and were often replayed again) occurred throughout the season.

==== American League ====
- May 24, Toronto Blue Jays vs. Cleveland Indians, tied at 4 through one out in the top of the 8th on account of a rain delay.

== Postseason ==
The postseason began on October 2 and ended on October 14 with the Detroit Tigers defeating the San Diego Padres in the 1984 World Series in five games.

=== Bracket ===
League Championship Series (ALCS, NLCS)
East	Detroit	3
West	Kansas City	0
East	Chicago Cubs	2
West	San Diego	3

World Series
AL	Detroit	4
NL	San Diego	1

== League leaders ==
=== American League ===
Hitting leaders
Stat	Player	Total
AVG	Don Mattingly (NYY)	.343
OPS	Dwight Evans (BOS)	.920
HR	Tony Armas (BOS)	43
RBI	Tony Armas (BOS)	123
R	Dwight Evans (BOS)	121
H	Don Mattingly (NYY)	207
SB	Rickey Henderson (OAK)	66

Pitching leaders
Stat	Player	Total
W	Mike Boddicker (BAL)	20
L	LaMarr Hoyt (CWS)	18
ERA	Mike Boddicker (BAL)	2.79
K	Mark Langston (SEA)	204
IP	Dave Stieb (TOR)	267.0
SV	Dan Quisenberry (KC)	44
WHIP	Bud Black (KC)	1.128

=== National League ===
Hitting leaders
Stat	Player	Total
AVG	Tony Gwynn (SD)	.351
OPS	Mike Schmidt (PHI)	.919
HR	Dale Murphy (ATL); Mike Schmidt (PHI)	36
RBI	Gary Carter (MON); Mike Schmidt (PHI)	106
R	Ryne Sandberg (CHC)	114
H	Tony Gwynn (SD)	213
SB	Tim Raines (MON)	75

Pitching leaders
Stat	Player	Total
W	Joaquín Andújar (STL)	20
L	Jeff Russell (CIN)	18
ERA	Alejandro Peña (LAD)	2.48
K	Dwight Gooden (NYM)	276
IP	Joaquín Andújar (STL)	261.1
SV	Bruce Sutter (STL)	45
WHIP	Dwight Gooden (NYM)	1.073

== Managerial changes ==
=== Off-season ===
Team	Former Manager	New Manager
Chicago Cubs	Charlie Fox	Jim Frey
Cincinnati Reds	Russ Nixon	Vern Rapp
Milwaukee Brewers	Harvey Kuenn	Rene Lachemann
New York Mets	Frank Howard	Davey Johnson
New York Yankees	Billy Martin	Yogi Berra

=== In-season ===
Team	Former Manager	New Manager
Cincinnati Reds	Vern Rapp	Pete Rose
Montreal Expos	Bill Virdon	Jim Fanning
Oakland Athletics	Steve Boros	Jackie Moore
San Francisco Giants	Frank Robinson	Danny Ozark
Seattle Mariners	Del Crandall	Chuck Cottier

== Milestones ==
=== Batters ===
==== Cycles ====
- Cal Ripken Jr. (BAL):
  - Ripken hit for his first cycle and seventh in franchise history, on May 6 against the Texas Rangers.
- Carlton Fisk (CWS):
  - Fisk hit for his first cycle and third in franchise history, on May 16 against the Kansas City Royals.
- Willie McGee (STL):
  - McGee hit for his first cycle and 16th in franchise history, on June 23 against the Chicago Cubs.
- Dwight Evans (BOS):
  - Evans hit for his first cycle and 17th in franchise history, on June 28 against the Seattle Mariners.

==== Other batting accomplishments ====
- Pete Rose (CIN/MON):
  - Recorded his 4,000th career hit as a member of the Montreal Expos with a double against the Philadelphia Phillies on April 13. He became the second player to reach this mark.
- Mike Schmidt (PHI):
  - Became the 20th player in Major League history to hit 400 home runs in the fifth inning against the Los Angeles Dodgers on May 15.
- Reggie Jackson (CAL):
  - Became the 13th player in Major League history to hit 500 home runs in game one of a doubleheader on June 30 against the Atlanta Braves.

=== Pitchers ===
==== Perfect games ====
- Mike Witt (CAL):
  - Pitched the 11th perfect game in major league history and the first in franchise history on September 30 against the Texas Rangers. Witt threw 94 pitches and struck out 10 in the 1–0 victory.

==== No-hitters ====
- Jack Morris (DET):
  - Morris threw his first career no-hitter and fifth no-hitter in franchise history, by defeating the Chicago White Sox 4–0 on April 7. Morris walked six and struck out eight.

==== Other pitching accomplishments ====
- Phil Niekro (NYY):
  - Recorded his 3,000th career strikeout on July 4 by striking out Larry Parrish of the Texas Rangers in the fourth inning. Niekro became the ninth player to reach this mark.

=== Miscellaneous ===
- Chicago White Sox:
  - Tied a major league record set in 1974 for most runs scored in the 25th inning, by scoring one run against the Milwaukee Brewers in a game that began on May 8 and ended in game one of a doubleheader on May 9.

== Awards and honors ==
Baseball Writers' Association of America Awards
BBWAA Award	National League	American League
Rookie of the Year	Dwight Gooden (NYM)	Alvin Davis (SEA)
Cy Young Award	Rick Sutcliffe (CHC)	Willie Hernández (DET)
Manager of the Year	Jim Frey (CHC)	Sparky Anderson (DET)
Most Valuable Player	Ryne Sandberg (CHC)	Willie Hernández (DET)
Babe Ruth Award (World Series MVP)	—	Jack Morris (DET)
Gold Glove Awards
Position	National League	American League
Pitcher	Joaquín Andújar (STL)	Ron Guidry (NYY)
Catcher	Tony Peña (PIT)	Lance Parrish (DET)
First Baseman	Keith Hernandez (NYM)	Eddie Murray (BAL)
Second Baseman	Ryne Sandberg (CHC)	Lou Whitaker (DET)
Third Baseman	Mike Schmidt (PHI)	Buddy Bell (TEX)
Shortstop	Ozzie Smith (STL)	Alan Trammell (DET)
Outfielders	Andre Dawson (MON)	Dwight Evans (BOS)
Outfielders	Bob Dernier (CHC)	Dwayne Murphy (OAK)
Outfielders	Dale Murphy (ATL)	Dave Winfield (NYY)
Silver Slugger Awards
Pitcher/Designated Hitter	Rick Rhoden (PIT)	Andre Thornton (CLE)
Catcher	Gary Carter (MON)	Lance Parrish (DET)
First Baseman	Keith Hernandez (NYM)	Eddie Murray (BAL)
Second Baseman	Ryne Sandberg (CHC)	Lou Whitaker (DET)
Third Baseman	Mike Schmidt (PHI)	Buddy Bell (TEX)
Shortstop	Garry Templeton (SD)	Cal Ripken Jr. (BAL)
Outfielders	José Cruz (HOU)	Tony Armas (BOS)
Outfielders	Tony Gwynn (SD)	Jim Rice (BOS)
Outfielders	Dale Murphy (ATL)	Dave Winfield (NYY)

=== Other awards ===
- Outstanding Designated Hitter Award: Dave Kingman (OAK)
- Roberto Clemente Award (Humanitarian): Ron Guidry (NYY)
- Hutch Award: Don Robinson (PIT)
- League Championship Series Most Valuable Player Award: Steve Garvey (SD, National); Kirk Gibson (DET, American)
- Rolaids Relief Man Award: Bruce Sutter (STL, National); Dan Quisenberry (KC, American)
- Sport Magazine's World Series Most Valuable Player Award: Alan Trammell (DET)

The Sporting News Awards
Award	National League	American League
Player of the Year	Ryne Sandberg (CHC)	—
Pitcher of the Year	Rick Sutcliffe (CHC)	Willie Hernández (DET)
Fireman of the Year (Relief pitcher)	Bruce Sutter (STL)	Dan Quisenberry (KC)
Rookie Player of the Year	Juan Samuel (PHI)	Alvin Davis (SEA)
Rookie Pitcher of the Year	Dwight Gooden (NYM)	Mark Langston (SEA)
Comeback Player of the Year	Joaquín Andújar (STL)	Dave Kingman (OAK)
Manager of the Year	Jim Frey (CHC)	—
Executive of the Year	Dallas Green (CHC)	—

=== Monthly awards ===
==== Player of the Month ====
Month	National League	American League
April	Tony Gwynn (SD)	Alan Trammell (DET)
May	Leon Durham (CHC)	Eddie Murray (BAL)
June	Ryne Sandberg (CHC)	Tony Armas (BOS)
July	José Cruz (HOU)	Kent Hrbek (MIN)
August	Keith Moreland (CHC)	Gary Ward (TEX)
September	Dale Murphy (ATL)	Greg Walker (CWS)

==== Pitcher of the Month ====
Month	National League	American League
April	Rick Honeycutt (LAD)	Jack Morris (DET)
May	Nolan Ryan (HOU)	Mike Boddicker (BAL)
June	Ron Darling (NYM)	Charlie Hough (TEX)
July	Orel Hershiser (LAD)	Willie Hernández (DET)
August	Rick Sutcliffe (CHC)	Roger Clemens (BOS)
September	Dwight Gooden (NYM)	Doyle Alexander (TOR)

=== Baseball Hall of Fame ===
- Luis Aparicio
- Don Drysdale
- Rick Ferrell
- Harmon Killebrew
- Pee Wee Reese

== Home field attendance ==
Team name	Wins	%±	Home attendance	%±	Per game
Los Angeles Dodgers	79	−13.2%	3,134,824	−10.7%	38,702
Detroit Tigers	104	13.0%	2,704,794	47.8%	32,985
California Angels	81	15.7%	2,402,997	−5.9%	29,667
Chicago White Sox	74	−25.3%	2,136,988	0.2%	26,383
Toronto Blue Jays	89	0.0%	2,110,009	9.3%	26,049
Chicago Cubs	96	35.2%	2,107,655	42.4%	26,346
Philadelphia Phillies	81	−10.0%	2,062,693	−3.1%	25,465
Baltimore Orioles	85	−13.3%	2,045,784	0.2%	25,257
St. Louis Cardinals	84	6.3%	2,037,448	−12.1%	25,154
San Diego Padres	92	13.6%	1,983,904	28.8%	24,493
New York Mets	90	32.4%	1,842,695	65.6%	22,749
New York Yankees	87	−4.4%	1,821,815	−19.3%	22,492
Kansas City Royals	84	6.3%	1,810,018	−7.8%	22,346
Atlanta Braves	80	−9.1%	1,724,892	−18.6%	21,295
Boston Red Sox	86	10.3%	1,661,618	−6.8%	20,514
Milwaukee Brewers	67	−23.0%	1,608,509	−32.9%	19,858
Montreal Expos	78	−4.9%	1,606,531	−30.8%	19,834
Minnesota Twins	81	15.7%	1,598,692	86.1%	19,737
Oakland Athletics	77	4.1%	1,353,281	4.5%	16,707
Cincinnati Reds	70	−5.4%	1,275,887	7.2%	15,752
Houston Astros	80	−5.9%	1,229,862	−9.0%	15,183
Texas Rangers	69	−10.4%	1,102,471	−19.1%	13,781
San Francisco Giants	66	−16.5%	1,001,545	−20.0%	12,365
Seattle Mariners	74	23.3%	870,372	7.0%	10,745
Pittsburgh Pirates	75	−10.7%	773,500	−36.9%	9,549
Cleveland Indians	75	7.1%	734,079	−4.5%	9,063

== Media ==
=== Television ===
Network	Day of week	Announcers
ABC	Monday nights Sunday afternoons	Al Michaels, Jim Palmer, Howard Cosell, Don Drysdale, Tim McCarver, Earl Weaver, Reggie Jackson
NBC	Saturday afternoons	Vin Scully, Joe Garagiola, Bob Costas, Tony Kubek

== Retired numbers ==
- Gussie Busch, who served as president, chairman, or CEO of the St. Louis Cardinals since Anheuser-Busch's purchase in 1953, had No. 85 retired on April 13 to reflect his age at the time of the season. This was the fifth number retired by the team.
- Ken Boyer had his No. 14 retired by the St. Louis Cardinals on May 20. This was the sixth number retired by the team.
- Joe Cronin had his No. 4 retired by the Boston Red Sox on May 30. This was the second number retired by the team.
- On July 1, the Los Angeles Dodgers retired two numbers, their seventh and eighth numbers retired by the team.
  - Pee Wee Reese had his No. 1 retired.
  - Don Drysdale had his No. 53 retired.
- On July 21, the New York Yankees retired two numbers, their 10th and 11th numbers retired by the team.
  - Roger Maris had his No. 9 retired.
  - Elston Howard had his No. 32 retired.
- Phil Niekro had his No. 35 retired by the Atlanta Braves on August 6. This was the fourth number retired by the team.
- Johnny Bench had his No. 5 retired by the Cincinnati Reds on August 11. This was the second number retired by the team.
- Luis Aparicio had his No. 11 retired by the Chicago White Sox on August 14. This was the fourth number retired by the team. He would have his number temporarily unretired, with his approval, for fellow Venezuelan shortstop Omar Vizquel, who played with the team during the 2010 and 2011 seasons.

== See also ==
- 1984 in baseball (Events, Movies, Births, Deaths)
- 1984 Nippon Professional Baseball season
