= 1984 American League Championship Series =

16th edition of Major League Baseball's American League Championship Series

Team (Wins)	Managers	Season
Detroit Tigers (3)	Sparky Anderson	104–58, .642, GA: 15
Kansas City Royals (0)	Dick Howser	84–78, .519, GA: 3
- Dates: October 2–5
- MVP: Kirk Gibson (Detroit)
- Umpires: Bill Deegan; Jon Bible (1B, 3 games); Randy Cristal (2B, 3 games); Larry Zirdel (3B, Game 1); Harold Jordan (OF, Game 1); Mike O'Dell (OF, Game 1); Bob Jones (3B, Game 2); Rick Denny (OF, Game 2); Carl Nothnagel (OF, Game 2); Doug Cossey (3B, Game 3); Dick Runchey (OF, Game 3); Dick Zivic (OF, Game 3)

Broadcast
- Television: ABC
- TV announcers: Al Michaels, Howard Cosell and Jim Palmer
- Radio: CBS; WJR (DET); WIBW (KC)
- Radio announcers: CBS: Bill White and Curt Gowdy; WJR: Ernie Harwell and Paul Carey; WIBW: Denny Matthews and Fred White

The 1984 American League Championship Series was a semifinal series in Major League Baseball’s 1984 postseason that matched the East Division champion Detroit Tigers against the West Division champion Kansas City Royals. The Tigers took the series in a three-game sweep to advance to the 1984 World Series against the San Diego Padres; the Royals never held a lead in any inning of the series. The sixteenth edition of the ALCS, it was the last to be played as a best-of-five, as both the American League and National League would change their League Championship Series to a best-of-seven format.

Due to a strike by major league umpires, the series was played using local and collegiate umpires, with former AL umpire and league supervisor Bill Deegan working home plate for all three games, using the balloon-style outside chest protector which had been mandatory for all AL umpires prior to 1975 but was banned for new hires in 1977 (umpires on staff before 1977 were covered by a grandfather clause if they wished to continue using the outside protector).

== Background ==
The 1984 American League Championship Series ended in a sweep by the Tigers, although Games 2 and 3 were both close. Game 2 was decided in extra innings, and the Tigers clinched the pennant with a 1–0 victory in Game 3. Detroit never trailed in the series, and led in 26 of the 29 innings played (with the other three tied). The result wasn't that surprising given that the Royals won 20 fewer games during the season and had won the AL West by a mere three games over both the California Angels and Minnesota Twins.

The striking umpires originally scheduled to work the ALCS were Marty Springstead (crew chief), Don Denkinger, Steve Palermo, Ken Kaiser, Greg Kosc and John Shulock (who was not a member of the Major League Umpires Association since he was hired by the AL during the 1979 MLUA strike).

== Summary ==
=== Detroit Tigers vs. Kansas City Royals ===
Detroit won the series, 3–0.

Game	Date	Score	Location	Time	Attendance
1	October 2	Detroit Tigers – 8, Kansas City Royals – 1	Royals Stadium	2:42	41,973
2	October 3	Detroit Tigers – 5, Kansas City Royals – 3 (11)	Royals Stadium	3:37	42,019
3	October 5	Kansas City Royals – 0, Detroit Tigers – 1	Tiger Stadium	2:39	52,168

== Game summaries ==
=== Game 1 ===
Tuesday, October 2, 1984, at Royals Stadium in Kansas City, Missouri

Team	1	2	3	4	5	6	7	8	9	R	H	E
Detroit	2	0	0	1	1	0	1	2	1	8	14	0
Kansas City	0	0	0	0	0	0	1	0	0	1	5	1
WP: Jack Morris (1–0) LP: Bud Black (0–1); Home runs: DET: Larry Herndon (1), Alan Trammell (1), Lance Parrish (1); KC: None

Game 1 was a blowout in Kansas City, as the Tigers struck first when Lou Whitaker singled to lead off the game off of Bud Black, then scored on Alan Trammell's triple. One out later, Lance Parrish's sacrifice fly made it 2–0 Tigers. Leadoff home runs by Larry Herndon in the fourth and Trammell in the fifth made it 4–0 Tigers. In the seventh, Royals' right fielder Pat Sheridan's error on Whitaker's line drive allowed him to reach second, then score on Trammell's single off of Mark Huismann. Tigers' Jack Morris pitched seven innings, allowing only one run in the seventh when Jorge Orta hit a leadoff triple and scored on Darryl Motley's groundout, with Willie Hernández pitching the final two innings. The Tigers added to their lead in the last two innings off of the Royals' bullpen. Barbaro Garbey led off the eighth with a single off of Huismann and scored on Darrell Evans's double, then Marty Castillo's RBI single made it 7–1 Tigers. Lance Parrish's leadoff home run in the ninth off of Mike Jones capped the scoring at 8–1 as the Tigers took a 1–0 series lead.

=== Game 2 ===
Wednesday, October 3, 1984, at Royals Stadium in Kansas City, Missouri

Team	1	2	3	4	5	6	7	8	9	10	11	R	H	E
Detroit	2	0	1	0	0	0	0	0	0	0	2	5	8	1
Kansas City	0	0	0	1	0	0	1	1	0	0	0	3	10	3
WP: Aurelio López (1–0) LP: Dan Quisenberry (0–1); Home runs: DET: Kirk Gibson (1); KC: None

The Tigers took Game 2 in extra innings by a 5–3 score. In the top of the first, Lou Whitaker reached on an error off of Bret Saberhagen, then back-to-back one-out RBI doubles by Kirk Gibson and Lance Parrish put the Tigers up 2–0. Gibson's home run in the third made it 3–0 Tigers. Dan Petry pitched seven innings and gave up two runs (on Jorge Orta's groundout in the fourth after a walk and single and Dane Iorg's RBI single in the seventh with two on), but lost his chance at a win when Willie Hernández surrendered the tying run in the eighth inning on Hal McRae's RBI double after a leadoff single. Detroit's "Senor Smoke", Aurelio López, held the Royals scoreless in the ninth, tenth and eleventh innings for the win. Johnny Grubb hit a double off Dan Quisenberry in the 11th inning to drive in Darrell Evans and Ruppert Jones for the game winning runs.

=== Game 3 ===
Friday, October 5, 1984, at Tiger Stadium in Detroit, Michigan

Team	1	2	3	4	5	6	7	8	9	R	H	E
Kansas City	0	0	0	0	0	0	0	0	0	0	3	3
Detroit	0	1	0	0	0	0	0	0	X	1	3	0
WP: Milt Wilcox (1–0) LP: Charlie Leibrandt (0–1) Sv: Willie Hernández (1)

The first postseason game at Tiger Stadium in 12 years was a pitcher's duel between Milt Wilcox and Charlie Leibrandt. Leibrandt pitched a complete game, allowing only one run and three hits, while Wilcox gave up two hits and struck out eight Royals with Willie Hernández pitching the ninth inning for the save. Marty Castillo's 2nd inning groundout drove in Chet Lemon for the game's lone run as the Tigers completed the three-game sweep and advanced to the World Series.

This was Detroit's first pennant in 16 years and the ninth in the team's history.

== Composite box ==
1984 ALCS (3–0): Detroit Tigers over Kansas City Royals

Team	1	2	3	4	5	6	7	8	9	10	11	R	H	E
Detroit Tigers	4	1	1	1	1	0	1	2	1	0	2	14	25	1
Kansas City Royals	0	0	0	1	0	0	2	1	0	0	0	4	18	7
Total attendance: 136,160 Average attendance: 45,387

== Aftermath ==
Had the ALCS gone the full five games, Game 5 on Sunday October 7, would have been a 1 p.m. ET time start instead of being in prime time. This would have happened because one of the presidential debates between Ronald Reagan and Walter Mondale was scheduled for that night. Accordingly, ABC planned to broadcast the debates instead of Game 5 in prime time.

The Royals would win the World Series the next season in 1985. It was seen as the culmination of ten years of dominance by the Royals, during which they reached the playoffs seven times, with stars such as George Brett, Hal McRae and Willie Wilson, but kept coming up just short. Unlike the 1976–1984 Royals, who played poorly in elimination games, the 1985 Royals went 6–0 in such games, after falling behind 2–0 and 3–1 and staging comebacks in both the American League Championship Series and World Series.

In 1998, the Detroit Tigers would move from the American League East to the American League Central and form a divisional rivalry with the Kansas City Royals.
