= Sheldon "Chief" Bender =

American baseball player, manager, and scout (1919–2008)

Chief Bender
- Born: Sheldon A. Bender; November 25, 1919; St. Louis, Missouri, U.S.
- Died: February 27, 2008 (aged 88); Hamilton, Ohio, U.S.
- Occupation(s): Baseball player, manager, scout and executive
- Years active: 1938–1941; 1946–2005

Sheldon "Chief" Bender (November 25, 1919 – February 27, 2008) was an American player and manager in minor league baseball and a scout, scouting director and farm system director in Major League Baseball who spent 64 years in the game.

Bender is most closely identified with the Cincinnati Reds, where he spent 39 years (1967–2005) as a front office executive and consultant. An associate of general manager Bob Howsam, Bender was Cincinnati's farm system director of the "Big Red Machine" era and served in that post for 22 years, 1967–88. His system produced such players as Baseball Hall of Famer Barry Larkin, Ken Griffey Sr., Dave Concepción, Don Gullett, Eric Davis and Paul O'Neill. The Reds' minor league player of the year award is named after him.

== Former minor league player, World War II veteran ==
Born in St. Louis, Missouri, Bender served in the United States Navy during World War II and was awarded a Purple Heart, having been wounded in an attack on a fortified Japanese position in New Georgia, in the Solomon Islands. The bullet remained in his body, an inch from his left hip, all his life.

After a playing career as an infielder (pre-war) and pitcher (post-war) in the minor leagues, Bender worked in the St. Louis Cardinals organization, managing for five seasons (1949–53) in their minor league system with Albany of the Class D Georgia–Florida League and Columbus of the Class A Sally League, winning two league championships and compiling a lifetime record of 409–286 (.588). He then scouted for the Cardinals and moved into their front office as director of player development when Howsam became Redbird GM in mid-August 1964. Bender was one of a handful of St. Louis executives who followed Howsam to Cincinnati in January 1967.

He was one of Howsam's most trusted aides. "He had a vitally important role on every major decision made under Howsam", said longtime Reds broadcaster Marty Brennaman upon Bender's death. "When they made the trade with Houston in 1971 (that netted Joe Morgan, among others), he was there."

Bender also played a role in bringing Baseball Hall of Fame manager Sparky Anderson to the Reds; as farm director of the Cardinals and then the Reds, he had hired Anderson to minor-league managerial posts in 1965 and 1968.

Many believed he was nicknamed in honor of Hall of Famer Charles "Chief" Bender, a Native American and star pitcher of the Philadelphia Athletics of the early 20th century; however according to his grandson, Eric Muller, Bender earned the nickname after his Navy rank as a chief petty officer. Bender was originally advised to use the nickname by Cardinals executive Bing Devine, who told him, "No one will remember the name 'Sheldon,' but people will remember 'Chief.'"

Chief Bender died in Hamilton, Ohio, at age 88 on February 27, 2008, after suffering a fall at his home.

== Honors ==
In 2008, Minor League Baseball (MiLB) began presenting the annual Sheldon "Chief" Bender Award to a person with distinguished service who has been instrumental in player development.
