= Aurelio López =

Mexican baseball player (1948–1992)

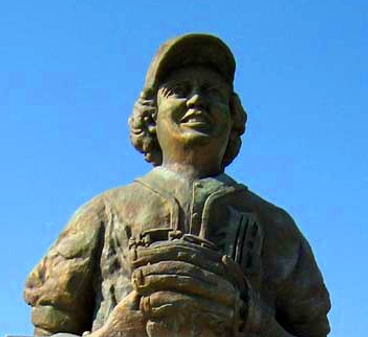
- Statue of López in Tecamachalco, Puebla
- Pitcher
- Born: September 21, 1948; Tecamachalco, Puebla, Mexico
- Died: September 22, 1992 (aged 44); Matehuala, San Luis Potosí, Mexico
- Batted: Right Threw: Right

MLB debut
- September 1, 1974, for the Kansas City Royals

Last MLB appearance
- June 17, 1987, for the Houston Astros

MLB statistics
- Win–loss record: 62–36
- Earned run average: 3.56
- Strikeouts: 635
- Saves: 93
- Stats at Baseball Reference

Teams
- Kansas City Royals (1974); St. Louis Cardinals (1978); Detroit Tigers (1979–1985); Houston Astros (1986–1987)

Career highlights and awards
- All-Star (1983); World Series champion (1984)

Member of the Mexican Professional

Baseball Hall of Fame
- Induction: 1993

Aurelio Alejandro López Rios (September 21, 1948 – September 22, 1992) was a Mexican professional baseball player. After pitching for several years in the Mexican League, he spent eleven seasons (1974, 1978–87) with four teams in Major League Baseball — a majority of it spent with the Detroit Tigers. He acquired the nickname "Señor Smoke" in Detroit, while he was known as "El Buitre de Tecamachalco" (The Vulture of Tecamachalco) in Mexico. López was discovered in his hometown by Mexican League scouts and converted from a starting pitcher to a relief pitcher.

López led the Mexico City Reds to the 1974 Mexican League World Series, then made a brief MLB debut with the Kansas City Royals before returning to the Mexican League. López was named the 1977 Mexican League Most Valuable Player (MVP). He returned to the major leagues with the St. Louis Cardinals in 1978 and pitched for the Detroit Tigers between 1979 and 1985. López finished seventh in the Cy Young Award voting in 1979. He earned a 10–1 record and 14 saves for Detroit's 1984 World Series championship team.

López returned to the postseason with Houston in 1986, but he was the losing pitcher in Game Six of that year's National League Championship Series. By the end of his MLB career, López earned a 62–36 win–loss record, 93 saves and a 3.56 earned run average (ERA). After his retirement from baseball, López served as municipal president of his hometown of Tecamachalco, Puebla, Mexico from 1989 until his death. He was killed in an automobile accident in 1992. López was inducted into the Mexican Professional Baseball Hall of Fame the following year.

== Early life ==
López was born on September 21, 1948, in Tecamachalco, Puebla, Mexico, to Aurelio López Hernández of Veracruz and Félix Rios Torres of Tecamachalco. He grew up with five siblings. In his youth, López enjoyed both soccer and baseball but chose to pursue the latter, which was in its peak in Mexico; he found it more difficult to locate practice facilities for soccer. He studied public administration at the Autonomous University of Puebla.

López caught the attention of scout Ramon "La Chita" García of the Mexico City Reds in the Mexican League. He debuted with the team's minor-league affiliate in Las Choapas in 1967. He was promoted to the parent club the next season at the age of 19. After starting the 1969 season with Mexico City, López joined the Minatitlán Red Devils. In 1970, López rejoined Mexico City. During his time in the Mexican League, he was converted from starter to reliever by coach Wilfredo Calviño.

The Kansas City Royals purchased López's contract in August 1974, shortly after he led the Mexico City Reds to the Mexican League World Series title in four straight games. The Royals also purchased the contracts of Mexican League players Orlando Cepeda and 16-year-old Germán Barranca in the same month. The Royals planned to use López in the September pennant race and throughout the next season. Lopez pitched in eight games in 1974, and he was bought back by the Mexico City Reds in early 1975.

During the 1977 Mexican League season, López earned a 19–3 win–loss record, a 2.01 ERA and 165 strikeouts over 157 innings in 73 games. Despite being a closer, he was fifth in the league in wins, and he set a new single-season save record (30). He was named the league's MVP. For several years in the mid- to late-1970s, López pitched winter baseball in the Mexican Pacific League. He broke league records by leading the league in games pitched three times, by earning eight consecutive relief wins in 1977–78, and by leading the league in relief appearances in four consecutive seasons. Among Mexican baseball fans, López became known as "El Buitre de Tecamachalco" (The Vulture of Tecamachalco).

== MLB career ==
López's contract was purchased by the St. Louis Cardinals from Mexico City on October 26, 1977. He joined the Springfield Redbirds of the Class AAA American Association for 1978, but returned to the major leagues during the 1978 season, earning a 4–2 record with the St. Louis Cardinals. After one season in St. Louis, López was traded to the Detroit Tigers with Jerry Morales for Jack Murphy and Bob Sykes. López posted some of his best individual statistics in the 1979 season, when he had a 10–5 win–loss record, 106 strikeouts, and a 2.41 ERA (an Adjusted ERA+ of 181). He was third in the AL in saves (21) and seventh in the Cy Young Award voting. López earned another 21 saves in 1980. In the 1981 season, he shared closer responsibilities, registering only three saves in the 1981 Major League Baseball strike-shortened season.

López suffered from shoulder problems beginning in spring training of 1982, and struggled that year, getting demoted to Detroit's Evansville Class AAA minor-league affiliate in July. He was called back up to Detroit on September 1, but later that month shocked his teammates by announcing that he was giving up his MLB career and returning to Mexico. López said that his reasons were personal, citing his family, the education of his children and the Mexican economy as motivating factors for his decision. Months later he had a change of heart, and returned to Detroit in time for the 1983 season. In February 1983, López became the first player in MLB history to receive a pay cut through salary arbitration. López had earned $285,000 in 1982, and asked for $315,000 for 1983, but the arbitrator ruled in favor of the Tigers' $250,000 submission. He finished 1983 with a 9–8 record, 2.81 ERA and 18 saves.

López is perhaps best known for his role as the setup reliever for the Tigers during their 1984 championship season, as the righthander was used to complement Tigers' lefthanded closer Willie Hernández. The latter had a dominant season, winning both the AL Cy Young Award and MVP, while López was brilliant in his own right, finishing with a 10–1 record, 14 saves, and a 2.94 ERA. López had a 1–0 record in the 1984 American League Championship Series (ALCS) and again in the 1984 World Series, and did not give up an earned run over the six combined innings he pitched that postseason. He faced seven batters in Game Five of the 1984 World Series, retiring them all in Detroit's 8-4 Championship-clinching victory. After the pitcher got out of two extra-inning jams to earn the win in Game 2 of the ALCS in Kansas City, Detroit manager Sparky Anderson said, "Nothing surprises me about Lopez. I've had him for five years and believe me, there's nothing like him. He's got heart and there is none better. He's one of the all-time hearts." While in Detroit, López had earned the nickname "Señor Smoke", as he hailed from Mexico and threw a powerful fastball.

By early 1985, López stated his intentions to enter free agency after the season. He placed his Detroit home up for sale, but appeared to soften when Detroit opened to the possibility of new contract negotiations. He said that he wanted to pitch another year or two and then enter the fast food business in Detroit. In late May, the Associated Press reported that López and Detroit reached a "gentleman's agreement" which would allow the pitcher to finish his career in Detroit, although no contract was signed. López finished the 1985 season with a 3–7 record and five saves. The Tigers made López a free agent in November of that year. He temporarily retired again in early 1986 before signing with the Houston Astros.

López pitched well for the Astros over the rest of 1986, helping the team make the postseason that year. In the 1986 National League Championship Series, he pitched 1 1/3 scoreless innings in Game Two, but was the losing pitcher in Game Six when the New York Mets won the series. López pitched the fourteenth through sixteenth innings and surrendered the go ahead run twice. During spring training before the 1987 season, López was arrested in Florida on charges of driving while intoxicated and driving with a suspended license. He earned his final major league save on May 12, 1987. He finished his MLB career with a 62–36 win–loss record, 93 saves and a 3.56 earned run average. López's career save total was the highest among Mexican pitchers in MLB until Joakim Soria surpassed the mark in 2010.

== Later life and death ==
After retiring from baseball, López moved back to Tecamachalco. He was elected municipal president of the city in 1990, a position that he held until his death. The post is equivalent to that of mayor. Early in his political service, he oversaw the installation of new water and drainage systems. Facing great opposition from the previous ruling family and even enduring shots fired at his home, he described his post as "like coming into a game with the bases loaded." As late as 1991, López mentioned the possibility of returning to baseball in a coaching role.

López was killed in an automobile accident the day after his 44th birthday in Matehuala, San Luis Potosí. He was driving a car that overturned, and was thrown from the vehicle. His wife Celia and another passenger were injured in the crash, and were hospitalized without serious injury. López left behind his wife and their two children, a son and a daughter. López was buried in Tecamachalco Cemetery.

== Legacy ==
López was inducted into the Mexican Professional Baseball Hall of Fame in 1993. He has been described as the pitcher with the highest velocity in Mexican baseball history. López had a reputation as a friendly player who got along well with other members of the team. Former Astros teammate Terry Puhl described López as "always upbeat," while fellow Astro Craig Reynolds noted that López was "everybody's friend."

Detroit rock band Electric Six named their album Señor Smoke (2005) in López's honor. In September 2012, a youth sports complex in Tecamachalco was named in honor of López.

In 2020, López was selected as the relief pitcher on the Mexican League Historic Ideal Team by a committee of baseball journalists and historians.
