= Jack Morris =

American baseball pitcher (born 1955)

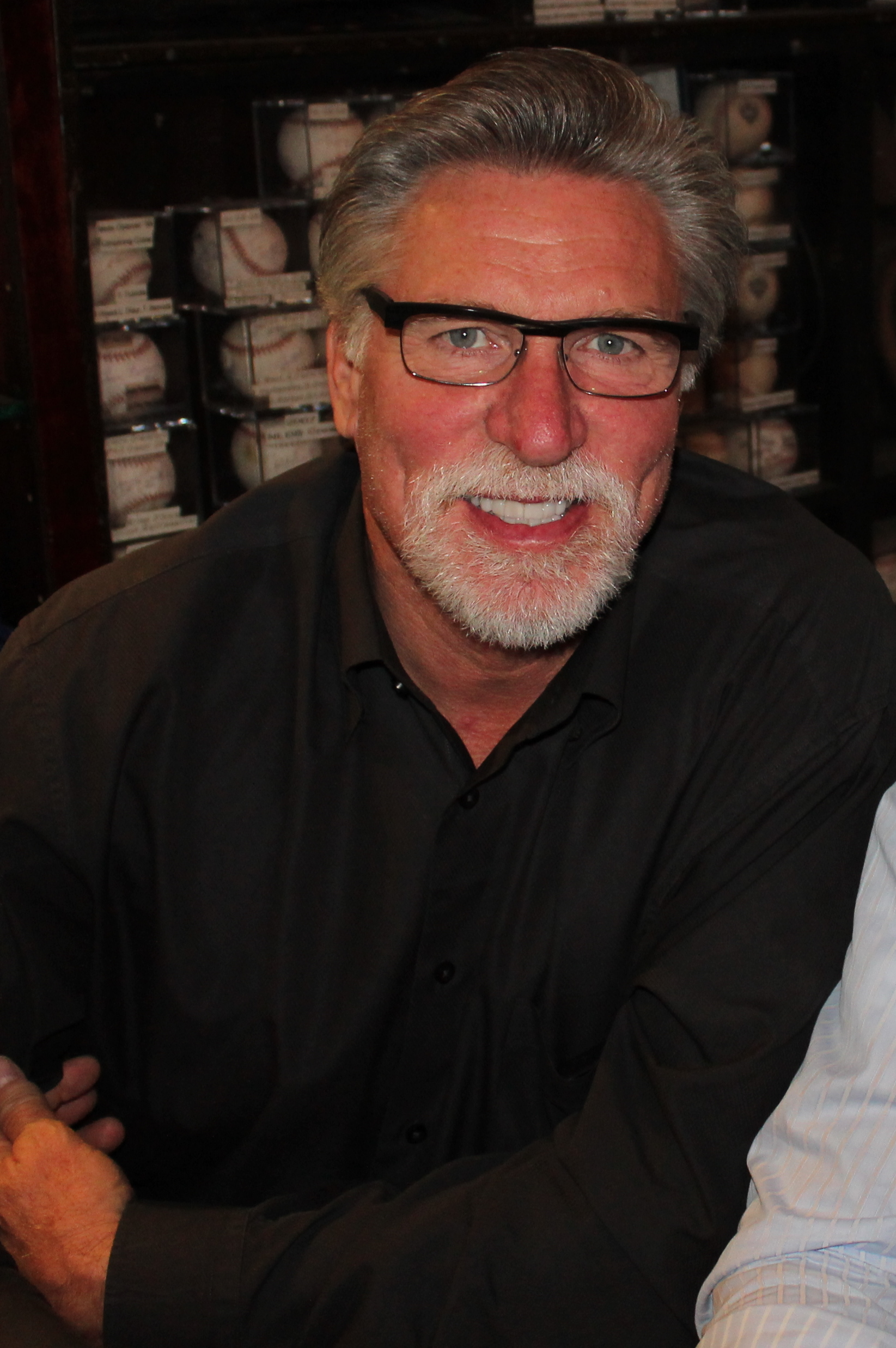
- Morris in 2013
- Pitcher
- Born: May 16, 1955 (age 71); Saint Paul, Minnesota, U.S.
- Batted: Right Threw: Right

MLB debut
- July 26, 1977, for the Detroit Tigers

Last MLB appearance
- August 7, 1994, for the Cleveland Indians

MLB statistics
- Win–loss record: 254–186
- Earned run average: 3.90
- Strikeouts: 2,478
- Stats at Baseball Reference

Teams
- Detroit Tigers (1977–1990); Minnesota Twins (1991); Toronto Blue Jays (1992–1993); Cleveland Indians (1994)

Career highlights and awards
- 5× All-Star (1981, 1984, 1985, 1987, 1991); 3× World Series champion (1984, 1991, 1992); World Series MVP (1991); 2× MLB wins leader (1981, 1992); AL strikeout leader (1983); Pitched a no-hitter on April 7, 1984; Detroit Tigers No. 47 retired

Member of the National

Baseball Hall of Fame
- Induction: 2018
- Vote: 87.5%
- Election method: Modern Baseball Era Committee

John Scott Morris (born May 16, 1955) is an American former professional baseball starting pitcher. He played in Major League Baseball (MLB) between 1977 and 1994, mainly for the Detroit Tigers. Morris won 254 games throughout his career.

Armed with a fastball, a slider, and a forkball, Morris was a five-time All-Star (1981, 1984, 1985, 1987, and 1991), and played on three World Series Championship teams (1984 Tigers, 1991 Minnesota Twins, and 1992 Toronto Blue Jays). He went 3–0 in the 1984 postseason with two complete-game victories in the 1984 World Series, and 4–0 in the 1991 postseason with a ten-inning complete-game victory in Game 7 of the 1991 World Series. Morris won the Babe Ruth Award in both 1984 and 1991, and was named World Series MVP in 1991. While he gave up the most hits, most earned runs, and most home runs of any pitcher in the 1980s, he also started the most games, pitched the most innings, and had the most wins of any pitcher in that decade. He is one of ten players in MLB history to have won back-to back World Series championships on different teams, with the other nine being Allie Clark, Clem Labine, Bill Skowron, Don Gullett, Ryan Theriot, Jake Peavy, Ben Zobrist, Joc Pederson, and Will Smith.

Since retiring as a player, Morris has worked as a broadcast color analyst for the Blue Jays, Twins, and Tigers. He has also been an analyst for MLB broadcasts on Fox Sports 1. Morris was inducted into the Baseball Hall of Fame in 2018. Morris has the highest career ERA among pitchers in the Hall of Fame.

== Playing career ==
=== Amateur career ===
Morris attended Highland Park High School in Saint Paul, Minnesota, graduating in 1973. He then attended Brigham Young University (BYU), and played college baseball for the BYU Cougars.

=== Detroit Tigers ===
The Detroit Tigers selected Morris in the fifth round of the 1976 MLB draft. He was first called up to the Tigers in 1977 after Mark Fidrych was placed on the disabled list with an injury. Morris broke into the Tigers' starting rotation in 1979, posting a 17–7 record and a 3.29 ERA and establishing himself as the ace of the Detroit staff. Morris, along with catcher Lance Parrish, shortstop Alan Trammell, second baseman Lou Whitaker, outfielder Kirk Gibson, and manager Sparky Anderson, played a notable role in turning the Tigers into a contending team for most of the 1980s. In 1980, Morris learned to throw the split-finger fastball from newly hired pitching coach Roger Craig, and it became an effective pitch for the rest of Morris' career. He led the major leagues with 14 wins in the strike-shortened 1981 season, while posting a 3.05 ERA.

Despite playing for the notorious "Captain Hook" (Anderson), nicknamed because of his tendency to pull his starters at the first sign of weakness, Morris was known for finishing games. He racked up 175 complete games in his career (154 with Detroit). He compiled double-digit complete game totals in 10 of his 12 full seasons as a Tiger. In 1983, Morris completed 20 of his 37 starts. That year, he led the league in innings pitched (293.2), batters faced (1204) and strikeouts (232), while posting his first 20-win season.

On April 7, 1984 (on NBC's nationally televised Game of the Week), Morris no-hit the Chicago White Sox at Comiskey Park, beginning what would be an excellent season for both him and the Tigers. The no-hitter was the first by a Tiger since Jim Bunning in 1958. By the end of the 1984 campaign, he had notched 19 wins and a 3.60 ERA, leading Detroit into the postseason. He scored a win over the Kansas City Royals in the ALCS, and added two more complete-game victories in the World Series against the San Diego Padres as the Tigers concluded their wire-to-wire 1984 campaign with the World Championship. While teammate Alan Trammell was named World Series MVP, Morris was given the Babe Ruth Award for most outstanding performance in the 1984 postseason.

In 1986, Morris went 21–8 with a 3.27 ERA and 223 strikeouts. His career-high six shutouts that season included a stretch from July 9–18 in which he threw a complete-game shutout in three consecutive starts. The Tigers headed to the postseason again in 1987 behind a team-leading 18 wins from Morris, but this time Morris' postseason performance was below expectations. He lost his only start in the ALCS, surrendering six runs in eight innings to the eventual World Champion Minnesota Twins. Despite a sub-par season in 1989 when he made only 24 starts and won just 6 games, he finished the 1980s with 162 wins, the most by a major league pitcher during the decade. In 1990, his final season in Detroit, Morris lost a career-high 18 games, though he also led the Tiger staff with 15 wins and led the AL with 11 complete games.

Morris had a 3–1 post-season record as a Tiger, with a 2.73 ERA.

=== Minnesota Twins ===
In 1991, Morris signed a one-year contract with his hometown Minnesota Twins. He enjoyed another great season, posting 18 wins with a 3.43 ERA, and an even better postseason after Minnesota won the AL West. Morris won both of his starts over the Toronto Blue Jays in the ALCS, and his team went on to face the Atlanta Braves in the World Series. Morris started for the Twins three times in the series, going 2–0 with a 1.17 ERA, making his final outing in the deciding Game 7. In a postseason performance for the ages, the 36-year-old hurler threw 10 innings of shutout baseball against the Braves, as the Twins won the game 1–0 on a 10th-inning single by Gene Larkin that scored Dan Gladden. Morris was named the World Series MVP for his performance, and joined fellow pitcher Sandy Koufax as the only players to win the Babe Ruth Award twice. He holds the record for most wins by a Twin in a single postseason, with four in 1991.

=== Toronto Blue Jays ===
Following the 1991 season, Morris signed a two-year contract with the Toronto Blue Jays. In the 1992 season, he earned 21 wins for the second time in his career (the first ever 20-win season for a Blue Jays pitcher) with only six losses, though he rode a wave of superior run support from his offense, given his 4.04 ERA that year. The Blue Jays reached the 1992 World Series against the Braves. Despite a subpar post-season performance (he went 0–3, including two World Series losses), Morris won a third World Series ring as Toronto beat Atlanta in six games. He won a fourth ring in 1993, as the Blue Jays repeated as World Champions with a victory over the Philadelphia Phillies in six games. However, Morris was not a factor in the Blue Jays World Series repeat: he pitched poorly for the team in the regular season, finishing 7–12 with a 6.19 ERA, and was not used at all in the postseason due to a season-ending injury.

On April 6, 1993, Morris set a major league record by making his 14th consecutive Opening Day start, becoming the fourth pitcher to make fourteen Opening Day starts to go with being the first (and so far only) pitcher to start the first game of a season in fourteen consecutive seasons.

=== Cleveland Indians and Cincinnati Reds ===
Morris joined the Cleveland Indians in 1994, but was released by the team on August 9, three days before the season was ended by a strike. Morris finished the season with a 10–6 record and an ERA of 5.60. He signed a one-year, $600,000 contract with the Cincinnati Reds on December 22, 1994. After an abortive attempt at a comeback with the Reds during spring training of 1995, Morris retired. In 1996, he made a brief return to professional baseball, this time playing with his hometown St. Paul Saints of the independent Northern League. The 41-year-old Morris went 5–1 in 10 starts, with a 2.69 ERA, before retiring for good.

=== Salary ===
Morris was the highest-paid pitcher in the American League on at least four occasions: 1987, 1988, 1991, and 1993.

=== Wildness ===
The split-finger pitch was responsible for Morris leading the league in wild pitches on six occasions. His 206 wild pitches in his career rank thirteenth in baseball history (tied with Adonis Terry) and third highest among pitchers who pitched their entire careers in the live-ball era. (Only Nolan Ryan with 277 and Phil Niekro with 226 rank higher than Morris.)

=== Awards and highlights ===
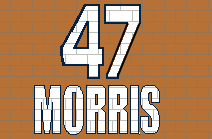
Jack Morris's number 47 was retired by the Detroit Tigers in 2018.

- 1981 – The Sporting News Pitcher of the Year
- 1984 – Babe Ruth Award
- 1986 – Tiger of the Year by the BBWAA-Detroit Chapter
- 1991 – Babe Ruth Award
- 1991 – World Series Most Valuable Player
- World Series Champion - 1984, 1991, 1992
- All-Star: 1981, 1984, 1985, 1987, 1991
- AL Wins Leader: 1981, 1992
- AL Strikeouts Leader: 1983
- AL Shutouts Leader: 1986
- AL Complete Games Leader: 1990
- Holds the major league record for consecutive opening day starts, with 14 (1980–1993)
- Ranks No. 8 on the all time MLB list for wild pitches with 206
- Ranks No. 1 in Detroit Tigers history for wild pitches (155) and balks (23).
- Holds Tigers' all-time record for most times leading the team in wins – 11 (1979–88, 1990).
- Morris is the only pitcher with 2,000-plus strikeouts who did not face a single pitcher in his career.
- Baseball Hall Of Fame Inductee - 2018 (Modern Era Committee)

== Post-career activities ==
Morris has spent time as a color analyst for the Minnesota Twins. He also spent time in Lakeland, Florida, as a part-time coach for the Detroit Tigers during spring training.

In 2013, Morris joined Sportsnet as a color analyst for Toronto Blue Jays radio broadcasts, as well as making appearances on television broadcasts. In 2014, he served as a pre- and post-game analyst for Twins telecasts on Bally Sports North (as well as a part-time substitute for regular game analyst Bert Blyleven) and as a regular on-air contributor on KTWN-FM and the Twins Radio Network.

On February 10, 2015, it was announced that Morris had been hired as a part-time analyst for Detroit Tigers telecasts on Fox Sports Detroit, along with former teammate Kirk Gibson. In a unique arrangement, Morris continued to work part-time for the Twins' television crew as well as the Tigers'. In 2017, it was announced that Morris would no longer do Tigers telecasts. On January 15, 2019, Morris was once again named a color commentator for the Tigers.

On August 17, 2021, Morris used an accent that some deemed insensitive during a broadcast while Shohei Ohtani of the Los Angeles Angels was at bat. Later during the broadcast, he issued an on-air apology. Ohtani said (through an interpreter), "Personally, I'm not offended and I didn't take anything personally." Following this incident, Morris was suspended indefinitely from the Tigers' broadcast booth, though he returned in less than a month's time. After the 2022 season, Morris parted ways from the Tigers broadcast team.

Morris has two sons from his first marriage and one with his second. He is known for his love of hunting and fishing, especially in his native Minnesota.

== Hall of Fame candidacy ==
Morris was eligible for the National Baseball Hall of Fame from 2000 to 2014, but did not receive the required 75% of the vote; from 2000 to 2003, he never received greater than 30%. But his vote totals slowly crept upwards as the years went by, receiving 40% of the vote for the first time in 2006. In 2010, he managed 52.3% of the vote. In 2012, he received 67% of the vote, and 67.7% a year later. On January 8, 2014, Morris received 61.5% of the vote in his last year of eligibility. After falling off the regular ballot, Morris was elected to the Hall by the Modern Era portion of the Veterans Committee in December 2017. He was inducted (as a Detroit Tiger) in 2018 along with former Tigers teammate Alan Trammell. His 3.90 career ERA is the highest of any player elected to the Hall of Fame as a pitcher.

As a result of being the first Hall of Fame pitcher to have played all of his games in the American League following the introduction of the designated hitter rule and before the start of interleague play, Morris has the fewest MLB regular-season at-bats of any player inductee: one. On April 30, 1987, Morris pitched a complete game victory over the California Angels; in the eighth, DH Mike Heath moved to first base, thus eliminating the designated hitter for the rest of the contest. Morris came up with two out in the ninth, hitting a foul fly to right; it was his first time in the batter's box since playing for the minor-league Evansville Triplets in 1977. (Morris also logged 19 appearances as a pinch runner in his career, scoring four times. This makes him the only Hall of Fame player to have more runs than plate appearances.)

== See also ==
- List of Major League Baseball individual streaks
- List of Major League Baseball career wins leaders
- List of Major League Baseball annual strikeout leaders
- List of Major League Baseball annual wins leaders
- List of Major League Baseball no-hitters
- List of Major League Baseball career strikeout leaders
- Best pitching seasons by a Detroit Tiger

Awards and achievements
Preceded by Mike Warren	No-hitter Pitcher; April 7, 1984	Succeeded by Mike Witt
Preceded by Steve Stone; Dave Stieb; Bob Welch	American League All-Star Game; Starting Pitcher; 1981; 1985; 1991	Succeeded by Dennis Eckersley; Roger Clemens; Kevin Brown
