= Marty Castillo =

American baseball player (born 1957)

- Castillo in 1984 photo
- Third baseman / Catcher
- Born: January 16, 1957 (age 69); Long Beach, California, U.S.
- Batted: Right Threw: Right

MLB debut
- August 19, 1981, for the Detroit Tigers

Last MLB appearance
- October 5, 1985, for the Detroit Tigers

MLB statistics
- Batting average: .190
- Home runs: 8
- Runs batted in: 32
- Stats at Baseball Reference

Teams
- Detroit Tigers (1981–1985)

Career highlights and awards
- World Series champion (1984)

Martin Horace Castillo (born January 16, 1957) is an American former Major League Baseball third baseman and catcher. Castillo, who is of Mexican descent, is an alumnus of Savanna High School in Anaheim, California and Chapman College.

Drafted by the Detroit Tigers in the fifth round of the 1978 Major League Baseball draft, Castillo made his Major League Baseball debut with the Tigers on August 19, 1981. Castillo played in only seven games combined in the 1981 and 1982 seasons, but saw more frequent action in 1983, playing in 67 games.

Castillo had his best statistical season as a member of the Tigers team that defeated the San Diego Padres in the 1984 World Series. Castillo played 33 games at third base and 36 at catcher for the 1984 Tigers. He had career highs in 1984, including a .234 batting average, 33 hits, 11 extra base hits, and 17 runs batted in (RBIs). On August 26, 1984, Castillo went 3-for-4 and scored three runs in a victory over the Angels. On September 23, 1984, Castillo went 2-for-3, including a home run and two RBIs, to help the Tigers win their 100th game of the season – a 4–1 victory over the New York Yankees.

Castillo played well in the post-season. He had two RBIs in the 1984 American League Championship Series, including the game-winning, pennant-clinching RBI in Game 3, knocking in Chet Lemon for a 1–0 victory, sending the Tigers to the World Series. Castillo also caught the ball at third base for the final out of the pennant-clinching game in 1984. An article in The Detroit News several years ago questioned whether Castillo still had the ball.

Castillo continued his strong hitting in the 1984 World Series, batting .333 with a .455 on-base percentage and a .667 slugging percentage. He had nine at bats in the World Series and had three hits, two runs scored, two walks, two RBIs, and a home run. What Castillo called "the greatest feeling of my life" came in Game 3 of the World Series, when he hit a two-run home run. With a count of one ball and two strikes, Castillo hit a fastball into the left field upper deck. He said of his reaction that "I wanted to do a couple of cartwheels, a backflip and a roundoff." Castillo was also on base in Game 5 (the final game) when Kirk Gibson hit a three-run home run in the bottom of the eighth inning off Goose Gossage.

In a 1984 Sports Illustrated article, Castillo was described as "an outgoing practical joker" and "one of the more popular Tigers." The article noted that Castillo was "so nice that Tom Monaghan, owner of the club and Domino's Pizza, doesn't object to Castillo's endorsing Little Caesars Pizza." When asked by Sports Illustrated if he would gain other endorsements as a result of his World Series home run, Castillo responded, "I'm not going to worry about it. But my new phone number is ..."

Castillo played his last major league game with the Tigers on October 5, 1985.
