= 1984 World Series =

81st edition of Major League Baseball's championship series

Team (Wins)	Managers	Season
Detroit Tigers (4)	Sparky Anderson	104–58, .642
San Diego Padres (1)	Dick Williams	92–70, .568
- Dates: October 9–14
- Venue(s): Jack Murphy Stadium (San Diego); Tiger Stadium (Detroit)
- MVP: Alan Trammell (Detroit)
- Umpires: Doug Harvey (NL), Larry Barnett (AL), Bruce Froemming (NL), Rich Garcia (AL), Paul Runge (NL), Mike Reilly (AL)
- Hall of Famers: Umpires: Doug Harvey; Tigers: Sparky Anderson (manager); Jack Morris; Alan Trammell; Padres: Dick Williams (manager); Goose Gossage; Tony Gwynn

Broadcast
- Television: NBC
- TV announcers: Vin Scully and Joe Garagiola
- Radio: CBS; WJR (DET); KFMB (SD)
- Radio announcers: Jack Buck and Brent Musburger (CBS); Ernie Harwell and Paul Carey (WJR); Jerry Coleman and Dave Campbell (KFMB)
- ALCS: Detroit Tigers over Kansas City Royals (3–0)
- NLCS: San Diego Padres over Chicago Cubs (3–2)

The 1984 World Series was the championship series of Major League Baseball's (MLB) 1984 season. The 81st edition of the World Series, it was a best-of-seven playoff played between the American League (AL) champion Detroit Tigers and the National League (NL) champion San Diego Padres. The Tigers defeated the Padres in five games to win their first championship since 1968.

This was the first World Series that Peter Ueberroth presided over as commissioner. Ueberroth began his tenure on October 1, succeeding Bowie Kuhn. Ueberroth had been elected as Kuhn's successor prior to the 1984 season but did not assume the job until the postseason, as he was serving as the chairman of the 1984 Summer Olympics in Los Angeles, which ran from July 28 through August 12.

This was the last World Series in which the designated hitter was used for games played in an NL team's ballpark; in even-numbered years since 1976, the DH was used in all games) until MLB's adoption of the universal DH in 2022. The next World Series had not used the DH as an odd-numbered year. From 1986 until 2021, the DH would be used in games played at the AL home parks.

As of 2026, this is Detroit’s last World Series championship, and they currently hold the sixth longest championship drought in the majors.

== Background ==
The San Diego Padres won the National League West division by 12 games over both the Atlanta Braves and the Houston Astros, then defeated the Chicago Cubs, three games to two, in the National League Championship Series. The Detroit Tigers won the American League East division by 15 games over the Toronto Blue Jays, then swept the Kansas City Royals, three games to none, in the American League Championship Series.

The World Series was scheduled to start and, if it went beyond five games, end in the National League host park, being an even numbered year. But since Wrigley Field still did not have permanent lighting in 1984, MLB decided that, if the Cubs were to advance to the World Series, the American League host park would instead have the home field advantage for the series while the Cubs would host the middle three games. Those games were scheduled to be played over the weekend of October 12-14, if necessary, such that only one night game, scheduled for the 12th, would be lost.

The 1984 World Series was a rematch between managers Sparky Anderson (Detroit) and Dick Williams (San Diego). The two had previously faced off in the 1972 World Series, with Anderson managing the Cincinnati Reds and Williams helming the victorious Oakland Athletics. The 1984 Series was Anderson's fifth overall as a manager—in addition to the 1972 Fall Classic, he had also managed the Reds during the 1970 World Series (which they lost to the Baltimore Orioles) and served as skipper during Cincinnati's back-to-back world championships in 1975 and 1976. Anderson's counterpart, Williams, was managing in his fourth World Series; he had headed the Boston Red Sox during the 1967 "Impossible Dream" season, when they won their first pennant in 21 years in a tight race over the Tigers, Minnesota Twins, and Chicago White Sox. After his Athletics won the 1972 World Series, Williams again led them to victory in the 1973 Series over the New York Mets.

Prior to 1984, only three managers (Joe McCarthy, Al Dark and Yogi Berra) had won pennants in both leagues. Nobody had ever won World Series as a manager in both leagues, thus ensuring that the winning manager of the 1984 Series would be the first to do so.

The 1984 World Series was also a battle of sorts between the multimillion-dollar American fast food chains. Domino's Pizza founder Tom Monaghan owned the Tigers while McDonald's founder Ray Kroc, who died several months before the 1984 World Series, owned the Padres. The series was informally known as the "Fast Food Fall Classic". It would feature the first World Series game at Jack Murphy Stadium (Game 1) and the final World Series game at Tiger Stadium (Game 5), as well as the last outdoor World Series game to be played entirely in the daytime (Game 4).

This also was the last time CBC Sports would simulcast NBC's broadcast of the World Series, although CBMT continued to flagship a syndicated television network put together by the Montreal Expos which included many Global Television Network affiliates. As a result of changes of broadcast rights in Canada, CTV, which held broadcast rights to the Toronto Blue Jays, would simulcast NBC's World Series coverage in 1986 and 1988.

=== Detroit Tigers ===
By May 24, 1984, the Detroit Tigers had just won their ninth straight game with Jack Morris on the mound winning his ninth game of the season. The Tigers record stood at 35–5, a major league record. In the next three games they would get swept by the Seattle Mariners and settle down to play .500 ball over the next 40 games. But in the end, they would wind up with a franchise record 104 wins and become only the third team in MLB history to lead the league wire-to-wire.

These Tigers were strong up the middle featuring all-stars at each middle position with catcher Lance Parrish setting a career high in home runs with 33, the record-setting duo of Lou Whitaker at second base and Alan Trammell at shortstop (they played together from 1977–95) and solid center-fielder Chet Lemon. In addition to Morris, the pitching staff was anchored by starters Dan Petry and Milt Wilcox, with eventual Cy Young Award and Most Valuable Player winner, Willie Hernández (9–3, 1.92 ERA, 32 saves), closing.

The Detroit Tigers signed free agent Darrell Evans (their first free-agent signing since Tito Fuentes in 1977) prior to the season, and acquired first baseman Dave Bergman in a trade with the Philadelphia Phillies that also brought them Hernández. Bergman became the Tigers' regular first baseman. Right fielder Kirk Gibson had a season with 27 home runs, 29 stolen bases, 91 RBIs, and a .282 batting average.

After winning two World Championships with the 1975–76 Cincinnati Reds, manager Sparky Anderson was primed to win his first in the American League in his fifth full season with the Detroit Tigers. Anderson proved to be somewhat prophetic. He made a bold prediction (in mid-1979, when he joined the Tigers) that his team would be a pennant-winner within five years.

=== San Diego Padres ===
Williams was in his third season with the San Diego Padres after leading them to identical 81–81 (.500) records in 1982 and 1983. 1984 would mark only the second time in Padre history that the team would finish over .500, the other being an 84–78 record in 1978. With the Padres' NL pennant in 1984, Williams became the second manager to take three teams to the World Series (he had previously taken the 1967 Red Sox and the 1972 and 1973 Athletics to the Fall Classic).

The Padres set a franchise record for victories with 92 in 1984, being led by two veterans, first baseman Steve Garvey and third baseman Graig Nettles. Statistically, this team was not overwhelming, with Nettles and Kevin McReynolds leading the team with just 20 home runs. (The team eventually would lose McReynolds in Game 4 of the NLCS due to a broken wrist.) No player came close to 100 RBIs (Garvey, 86) or had over 30 doubles in the regular season, although Tony Gwynn won the first of his eight National League batting titles by hitting for a .351 average with 213 hits.

The pitching staff was average—a staff of twentysomethings and a 33-year-old closer, Goose Gossage (10–6, 25 SVs), who was signed as a free agent from the New York Yankees. Eric Show led the staff with 15 wins with Ed Whitson and lefty Mark Thurmond having identical 14–8 records. But the sterling bullpen, headed by Gossage and Craig "Lefty" Lefferts, held the staff together enough to take this team to the "Big Show" although they would falter and get ripped by the Tiger bats losing the Series in five games.

To get to the Series, the Padres had to overcome a two-games-to-none deficit against the Chicago Cubs in the NLCS, rallying to win the final three games. The 1984 Padres adopted Ray Parker Jr.'s "Ghostbusters" as their theme song (à la the 1979 Pittsburgh Pirates using Sister Sledge's "We Are Family" as their theme song). During their playoff series against the Chicago Cubs, the Padre fans turned Ghostbusters into Cubbusters.

== Summary ==
AL Detroit Tigers (4) vs. NL San Diego Padres (1)

Game	Date	Score	Location	Time	Attendance
1	October 9	Detroit Tigers – 3, San Diego Padres – 2	Jack Murphy Stadium	3:18	57,908
2	October 10	Detroit Tigers – 3, San Diego Padres – 5	Jack Murphy Stadium	2:44	57,911
3	October 12	San Diego Padres – 2, Detroit Tigers – 5	Tiger Stadium	3:11	51,970
4	October 13	San Diego Padres – 2, Detroit Tigers – 4	Tiger Stadium	2:20	52,130
5	October 14	San Diego Padres – 4, Detroit Tigers – 8	Tiger Stadium	2:55	51,901

== Matchups ==
=== Game 1 ===
Larry Herndon hit the go-ahead home run in the fifth inning as Detroit defeated San Diego to start the Series.

Tuesday, October 9, 1984 5:35 pm (PT) at Jack Murphy Stadium in San Diego, California 72 °F (22 °C), partly cloudy
Team	1	2	3	4	5	6	7	8	9	R	H	E
Detroit	1	0	0	0	2	0	0	0	0	3	8	0
San Diego	2	0	0	0	0	0	0	0	0	2	8	1
WP: Jack Morris (1–0) LP: Mark Thurmond (0–1); Home runs: DET: Larry Herndon (1); SD: None

The Tigers struck first in Game 1 when Lou Whitaker doubled to lead off the top of the first and scored on Alan Trammell's single but their starter Jack Morris (a 19-game winner during the season) struggled in the bottom half, as he surrendered two-out singles to Steve Garvey and Graig Nettles, followed by a two-run double to Terry Kennedy. Padre starter Mark Thurmond took a 2–1 lead into the fifth, but then surrendered a crucial two-out, two-run homer to Larry Herndon. Nettles and Kennedy both singled to open the San Diego sixth, but Morris snuffed out their momentum by striking out the rest of the side. Kurt Bevacqua started what looked to be a comeback with a leadoff double in the seventh, but he was thrown out at third while attempting to stretch the hit into a triple. Despite the close call, Morris remained focused and set down the last nine remaining Padre batters for a complete game, 3–2 victory.

=== Game 2 ===
Andy Hawkins came in relief for San Diego with 5 1/3 shutout innings as San Diego evened the Series.

Wednesday, October 10, 1984 5:25 pm (PT) at Jack Murphy Stadium in San Diego, California 72 °F (22 °C), partly cloudy
Team	1	2	3	4	5	6	7	8	9	R	H	E
Detroit	3	0	0	0	0	0	0	0	0	3	7	3
San Diego	1	0	0	1	3	0	0	0	X	5	11	0
WP: Andy Hawkins (1–0) LP: Dan Petry (0–1) Sv: Craig Lefferts (1); Home runs: DET: None; SD: Kurt Bevacqua (1)

In Game 2, Lou Whitaker, Alan Trammell and Kirk Gibson hit consecutive singles to lead off the top of the first and put the Tigers up 1–0. After Gibson stole second, Trammell scored on Lance Parrish's sacrifice fly, then Darrell Evans's RBI single made it 3–0 Tigers. Padre starter Ed Whitson was pulled after just 2/3 innings. In the bottom of the inning, the Padres cut the lead to 3–1 on Graig Nettles's sacrifice fly, then in the fourth, Bobby Brown's RBI groundout made it 3–2 Tigers. Kurt Bevacqua then evened the series at 1–1 with a three-run home run in the fifth-inning off Dan Petry. To date, this remains the only World Series victory in Padres history. Andy Hawkins earned the win with 5 1/3 shutout innings while Craig Lefferts pitched a three-inning save.

Game 2 at Jack Murphy Stadium marked the last MLB playoff game until the introduction of the universal DH in 2022 where the DH was used in a National League ballpark. Before this, any World Series game in an American League park used the DH (previously, the DH was used in alternating World Series), while pitchers batted in the NL parks. The next time the DH rule was used in a National League park was during a regular season series between the Toronto Blue Jays and Philadelphia Phillies during the 2010 season.

=== Game 3 ===
Marty Castillo hit a two-run home run in what became a four-run second inning as the Tigers took the lead back in the Series.

Friday, October 12, 1984 8:35 pm (ET) at Tiger Stadium in Detroit, Michigan 66 °F (19 °C), overcast
Team	1	2	3	4	5	6	7	8	9	R	H	E
San Diego	0	0	1	0	0	0	1	0	0	2	10	0
Detroit	0	4	1	0	0	0	0	0	X	5	7	0
WP: Milt Wilcox (1–0) LP: Tim Lollar (0–1) Sv: Willie Hernández (1); Home runs: SD: None; DET: Marty Castillo (1)

By the time the 1984 World Series rolled around, Tiger Stadium (built in 1912) became the oldest ballpark to ever host a World Series game. That record was eclipsed by Boston's Fenway Park (opened April 20, 1912, the same day as Tiger Stadium), which hosted in 1986, 2004, 2007 and 2013, and then by Chicago's Wrigley Field (opened in 1914), which hosted the Fall Classic in 2016 until being reclaimed by Fenway Park in 2018.

Tim Lollar failed to make it out of the second inning as Detroit erupted for four runs. Chet Lemon singled with one out, then with two outs, Marty Castillo's home run made it 2–0 Tigers. Lou Whitaker then walked and scored on Alan Trammell's double. A walk and single loaded the bases before Greg Booker relieved Lollar and walked Larry Herndon to force in another run. The Padres got on the board in the third when back-to-back leadoff singles off Milt Wilcox was followed by an RBI groundout by Steve Garvey, but in the bottom of the inning, Booker walked three to load the bases with two outs. Greg Harris in relief hit Kirk Gibson with a pitch to force in the Tigers' last run. The Padres scored their last run in the seventh on Graig Nettles's sacrifice fly with runners on second and third off Bill Scherrer. Willie Hernández pitched 2 1/3 innings of one-hit relief for the save. The 5–2 victory gave the Tigers a two games-to-one series lead.

=== Game 4 ===
Alan Trammell had a two-HR game for Detroit that drove in all four runs as the Tigers inched closer to the championship.

Saturday, October 13, 1984 1:30 pm (ET) at Tiger Stadium in Detroit, Michigan 63 °F (17 °C), overcast
Team	1	2	3	4	5	6	7	8	9	R	H	E
San Diego	0	1	0	0	0	0	0	0	1	2	5	2
Detroit	2	0	2	0	0	0	0	0	X	4	7	0
WP: Jack Morris (2–0) LP: Eric Show (0–1); Home runs: SD: Terry Kennedy (1); DET: Alan Trammell 2 (2)

Alan Trammell drilled a pair of two-run homers in the first and third innings to account for all of Detroit's offense as the Tigers beat Eric Show to take a three games-to-one lead in the Series. Jack Morris got his second Series victory in another complete-game effort, allowing two runs on Terry Kennedy's home run in the second and a wild pitch in the ninth to Kennedy that scored Steve Garvey, and five hits.

=== Game 5 ===
Kirk Gibson drove in five runs as Detroit won their first championship since 1968.

Sunday, October 14, 1984 4:45 pm (ET) at Tiger Stadium in Detroit, Michigan 66 °F (19 °C), light fog
Team	1	2	3	4	5	6	7	8	9	R	H	E
San Diego	0	0	1	2	0	0	0	1	0	4	10	1
Detroit	3	0	0	0	1	0	1	3	X	8	11	1
WP: Aurelio López (1–0) LP: Andy Hawkins (1–1) Sv: Willie Hernández (2); Home runs: SD: Kurt Bevacqua (2); DET: Kirk Gibson 2 (2), Lance Parrish (1)

For the fourth consecutive game, the Padres' starting pitcher did not make it past the third inning, as the Tigers jumped on Mark Thurmond for three runs in the first inning. Lou Whitaker singled to lead off, then Kirk Gibson homered an out later, followed by consecutive singles by Lance Parrish, Larry Herndon and Chet Lemon. The Padres got on the board in the third when Bobby Brown hit a leadoff single off Dan Petry, moved to third on two groundouts and scored on Steve Garvey's single. The Padres rallied to tie the score in the fourth when with runners on second and third Brown's sacrifice fly and Alan Wiggins's RBI single scored a run each to knock Petry out of the game, but the Tigers loaded the bases in the fifth off Andy Hawkins when Rusty Kuntz's sacrifice fly put them up 4–3. Parrish's home run in the seventh off Rich Gossage made it 5–3 Tigers, but the Padres cut the lead back to one on Kurt Bevacqua's home run off closer Willie Hernández. Kirk Gibson came to the plate in the bottom of the eighth for the Tigers with runners on second and third and one out. Gibson had homered earlier in the game, and Padres manager Dick Williams strolled to the mound to talk to Goose Gossage, seemingly with the purpose of ordering him to walk Gibson intentionally. Just before the at-bat, Gibson made a US$10 bet (flashing ten fingers) with his manager Sparky Anderson that Gossage (who had dominated Gibson in the past) would pitch to him. Gossage talked Williams into letting him pitch to Gibson, and Gibson responded with a three-run blast into the upper deck to clinch the Series for the Tigers. Gibson wound up driving in five runs and scoring three, including the run that gave Detroit the lead for good when he raced home on a pop-up sacrifice fly by little-used reserve Rusty Kuntz.

In the ninth, Willie Hernández closed out the series for the Tigers by getting Tony Gwynn to fly to Larry Herndon in left field for the final out. It ended a sixteen-year championship drought for both the Tigers and the city of Detroit in general.

While Alan Trammell won the Sport Magazine variation of the World Series Most Valuable Player Award (the official one), Jack Morris won the Babe Ruth Award from the New York City chapter of the Baseball Writers' Association of America. Kirk Gibson had a stellar World Series as well, batting .333 with 6 hits and 7 RBIs, including two homeruns and scoring 4 runs.

After being fired by the Cincinnati Reds in 1978, Sparky Anderson was hired by the Tigers in June 1979. Anderson, who had led the Reds to Series victories in 1975 and 1976, became the first manager to win a World Championship in both the American and National Leagues.

== Composite box ==
1984 World Series (4–1): Detroit Tigers (A.L.) over San Diego Padres (N.L.)

Team	1	2	3	4	5	6	7	8	9	R	H	E
Detroit Tigers	9	4	3	0	3	0	1	3	0	23	40	4
San Diego Padres	3	1	2	3	3	0	1	1	1	15	44	4
Total attendance: 271,820 Average attendance: 54,364; Winning player's share: $51,831 Losing player's share: $42,426

== Records ==
Three players set or tied World Series hitting records for a five-game World Series during the 1984 World Series. Series MVP Alan Trammell tied a record by with nine total hits, while teammate Lou Whitaker tied another record by scoring six runs. The Padres' Carmelo Martinez set a record by striking out nine times. Each of these records still stands, as of 2019.

== Post-game Riots ==
There was some celebratory rioting after Detroit won, resulting in one death and dozens of injuries.

== See also ==
- 1984 Japan Series
- San Diego sports curse
