= Alan Trammell =

American baseball player, coach and manager (born 1958)

- Trammell with the Detroit Tigers in 1978
- Shortstop / Manager
- Born: February 21, 1958 (age 68); Garden Grove, California, U.S.
- Batted: Right Threw: Right

MLB debut
- September 9, 1977, for the Detroit Tigers

Last MLB appearance
- September 29, 1996, for the Detroit Tigers

MLB statistics
- Batting average: .285
- Hits: 2,365
- Home runs: 185
- Runs batted in: 1,003
- Managerial record: 187–302
- Winning %: .382
- Stats at Baseball Reference
- Managerial record at Baseball Reference

Teams
- As player: Detroit Tigers (1977–1996); As manager: Detroit Tigers (2003–2005); Arizona Diamondbacks (2014); As coach: Detroit Tigers (1999); San Diego Padres (2000–2002); Chicago Cubs (2007–2010); Arizona Diamondbacks (2011–2014); Detroit Tigers (2015)

Career highlights and awards
- 6× All-Star (1980, 1984, 1985, 1987, 1988, 1990); World Series champion (1984); World Series MVP (1984); 4× Gold Glove Award (1980, 1981, 1983, 1984); 3× Silver Slugger Award (1987, 1988, 1990); Detroit Tigers No. 3 retired

Member of the National

Baseball Hall of Fame
- Induction: 2018
- Vote: 81.3%
- Election method: Modern Baseball Era Committee
Medals
Men's baseball
Representing United States
World Baseball Classic
Gold medal – first place	2017 Los Angeles	Team

Alan Stuart Trammell (/ˈtræmɛl/ TRAM-el; born February 21, 1958) is an American former professional baseball shortstop, manager, and coach. He is a member of the National Baseball Hall of Fame. He played for the Detroit Tigers for the entirety of his 20-year playing career in Major League Baseball (MLB). Trammell has served as a special assistant to the general manager of the Detroit Tigers since the 2014 season.

Trammell won the 1984 World Series championship over his hometown San Diego Padres, earning Series MVP honors. His team also won an American League East division championship in 1987. Although his arm was not overpowering, he had a quick release and made accurate throws, ultimately winning four Gold Glove awards. Trammell's defense perfectly complemented his double-play partner, Lou Whitaker. The two formed the longest continuous double-play combination in major league history, playing 19 seasons together. At the plate, Trammell was one of the best-hitting shortstops of his era and won three Silver Slugger awards.

Trammell later served as the Tigers' manager from 2003 through 2005. He also served as the interim manager for the Arizona Diamondbacks during the final three games of the 2014 season. He was inducted into the Baseball Hall of Fame in 2018.

== Playing career ==
=== Early years ===
Trammell attended Kearny High School in San Diego, California and played American Legion Baseball. He was named the 1989 American Legion Graduate of the Year.

The Detroit Tigers selected him in the second round of the 1976 MLB draft. While playing for the Tigers' farm team in Montgomery of the Southern League, Trammell played his first game with teammate Lou Whitaker before the two infielders were promoted, making their major league debut at Fenway Park together, during the second game of a double-header on September 9, 1977, the first of nineteen seasons together. Both players became regulars at their positions the following season.

Trammell batted .300 in 1980 as he made the All-Star team for the first time. In 1983, he batted .319 with 14 home runs, 66 runs batted in and 30 stolen bases. Having hit .258 in both 1981 and 1982, Trammell won the 1983 MLB Comeback Player of the Year Award in the American League (AL).

Trammell and Whitaker made a cameo appearance on the television show Magnum, P.I., starring Tom Selleck, during the 1983 season. Selleck's character was a Tigers fan, as is Selleck himself.

=== 1984 ===
The Tigers enjoyed a championship-winning season in 1984, when they started the season 35–5 and led the AL wire-to-wire en route to winning the World Series. Despite a season-long battle with tendinitis in his shoulder that caused him to miss 23 regular season games, Trammell finished fifth in the AL batting race with a .314 mark and ranked eighth in on-base percentage (.382). In the AL Championship Series against the Kansas City Royals, he hit .364 with one home run and three RBI. Finally, in the World Series, he hit .450 (9-for-20) against the San Diego Padres, including a pair of two-run home runs that accounted for all of the Tigers' scoring in a Game 4 victory. Detroit won the series 4–1, and Trammell was named World Series MVP.

=== 1985–1988 ===
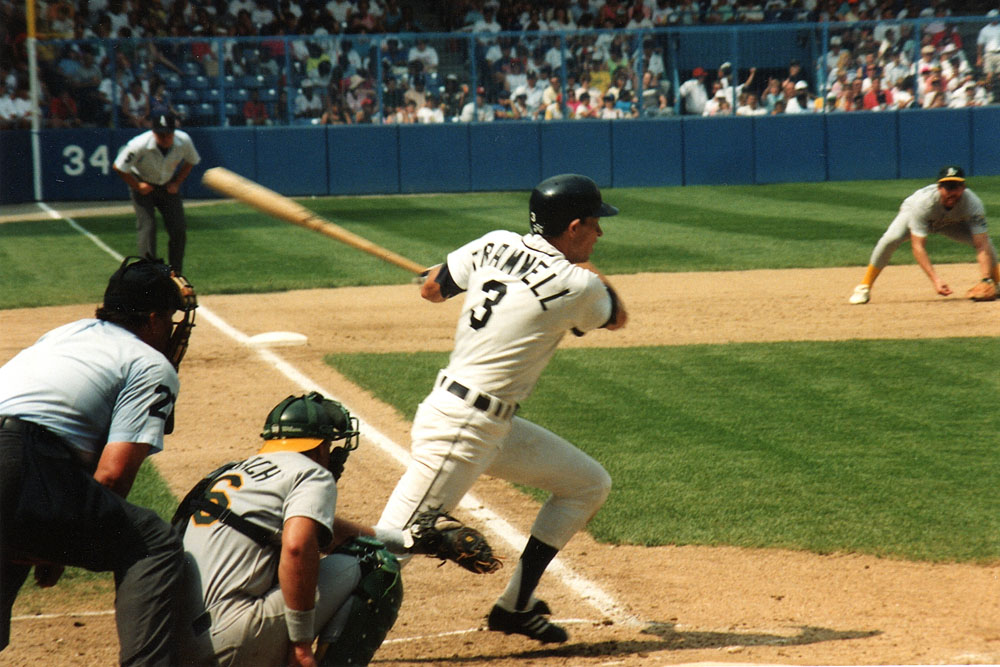
Trammell at bat for Detroit in 1991

In 1985, after two consecutive years of batting not lower than .314, Trammell was hampered by injuries and posted only a .258 batting average. He underwent postseason surgery on his left knee and right shoulder. The following season, a fully healthy Trammell hit 21 homers and stole 25 bases, becoming only the second player in Detroit history to hit 20+ home runs and steal 20+ bases in the same season. (Kirk Gibson was the other, while Curtis Granderson and Robbie Grossman later joined the club.) Trammell also set a career-high with 75 RBI.

In 1987, asked by manager Sparky Anderson to replace the departed Lance Parrish as cleanup hitter, Trammell responded with his best major league season, hitting a career-high 28 home runs to go with a .343 batting average (ranking third in the AL). In addition, Trammell appeared among the league leaders in most other AL offensive categories: third in hits (205), tenth in RBI (105), tied for fifth in runs (109), fourth in total bases (329), fifth in on-base percentage (.402), eighth in slugging average (.551), sixth in on-base plus slugging (.953), fifth in OPS+ (155), and tied for fifth in game-winning RBI (16). In September, he batted .416 with six homers and 17 RBI and put together an 18-game hitting streak in which he hit .457. On the penultimate day of the regular season, he hit a walk-off single against the Toronto Blue Jays to help his team take the AL East division lead, which they clinched the next day. He became the first Tiger to collect 200 hits and 100 RBI in the same season since Al Kaline did it in 1955. Trammell also became the first shortstop to hit at least .340 with 20+ home runs and 100+ RBI in a season in big league history. Despite his efforts, Trammell finished second to Toronto's George Bell in the MVP voting (332–311). After the season finale, Whitaker gave him second base, on which he had written: To Alan Trammell, 1987 Most Valuable Player, from your friend Lou Whitaker.

Trammell followed up with a .311 season in 1988, though a stint on the disabled list limited him to 128 games that year.

=== Later years, injuries, and retirement ===
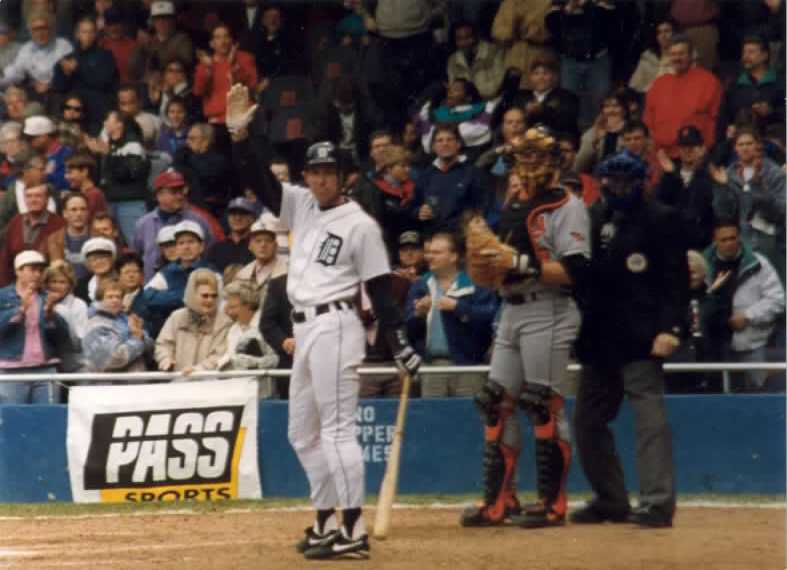
Trammell during his final at bat at Tiger Stadium in 1996

Following the 1990 season, in which he hit .304 with 89 RBI in 146 games, Trammell suffered a long string of injuries that reduced his production over his final years. In 1991, knee and ankle injuries limited Trammell to 101 games. During the following season, he played in 29 games before breaking his right ankle and missing the remainder of the 1992 season. He hit .329 in a resurgent 1993 season but was ineligible to be ranked among the AL batting leaders because he only had 447 plate appearances. In his final five seasons, Trammell averaged 76 games played after averaging 140 games played the first 13 seasons of his career. From 1993 to 1996, Trammell saw less time at shortstop in favor of Travis Fryman and eventually Chris Gomez and Andújar Cedeño. He instead saw playing time at several positions, including shortstop, third base, second base, left field, center field, and designated hitter. Trammell retired following the 1996 season.

In his 20-year career, Trammell batted over .300 seven times, ending with a career average of .285 and 185 home runs with 1,003 RBI, 1,231 runs, 2,365 hits, 412 doubles, 55 triples, 236 stolen bases and 850 walks in 2,293 games. He compiled a .977 fielding percentage at shortstop, his primary position.

=== Hall of Fame consideration and induction ===
In 2001, Trammell was rated as the ninth-best shortstop of all time in "The New Bill James Historical Baseball Abstract", placing him higher than fourteen Hall of Fame shortstops. In subsequent years, Trammell's candidacy for the Hall of Fame picked up increasing support from the sabermetric community. In his first 12 years of eligibility, he received the following percentage of votes: 15.7% (2002), 14.1% (2003), 13.8% (2004), 16.9% (2005), 17.7% (2006), 13.4% (2007), 18.2% (2008), 17.4% (2009), 22.4% (2010), 24.3% (2011), 36.8% (2012), 33.6% (2013), and 20.8% (2014). His boost in later years was likely due to voters being more receptive to advanced metrics, such as wins above replacement.

Trammell was on his 15th and final Baseball Writers' Association of America ballot in 2016, failing to earn enough for induction. Trammell was one of the last candidates to be allowed on the ballot for 15 years after the BBWAA reduced eligibility to ten years, and would next be considered for the Veterans Committee Expansion starting from 2017. On December 10, 2017, he was elected to the Hall of Fame by the Modern Baseball Committee alongside teammate Jack Morris. They were inducted in July 2018.

In 1998, Trammell was elected into the National Polish-American Sports Hall of Fame.

=== Jersey number retirement ===
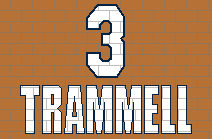
Alan Trammell's number 3 was retired by the Detroit Tigers in 2018.

Alan Trammell's jersey #3 was retired by the Tigers in a ceremony on August 26, 2018. His name and number were added to the brick wall in left-center field at Comerica Park, alongside Charlie Gehringer (#2), Hank Greenberg (#5), Al Kaline (#6), Sparky Anderson (#11), Hal Newhouser (#16), Willie Horton (#23), Ty Cobb (no number) and Jack Morris (#47). Jackie Robinson's #42 was retired throughout baseball in 1997. Double-play mate Lou Whitaker had his #1 retired in 2022, and it now fittingly stands to the right of Trammel's on the outfield wall.

== Managerial and coaching career ==
After his retirement, Trammell coached for Detroit (1999, hitting coach) and the San Diego Padres (2000–2002, first base coach) before becoming a manager.

=== Detroit Tigers ===
Trammell was named the manager of a struggling Tigers team on October 9, 2002. The team lost 119 games in his first season in 2003, an American League record at the time, before posting a 72–90 record in 2004. In the 2005 season, however, the team's record regressed slightly, finishing 71–91. During Trammell's three years as manager, the Tigers compiled a record of 186–300.

During the 2003 season, Detroit nearly matched the modern MLB record of 120 losses, set by the expansion New York Mets (40–120) in 1962. The Tigers won five of their last six games to avoid the distinction. The Mets' major league record and Tigers' American League record for losses was later surpassed by the 2024 Chicago White Sox.

On October 3, 2005, the Tigers released Trammell after three seasons in which the organization failed to post a winning record. Trammell was replaced by Jim Leyland on October 4, 2005. Leyland led Detroit to a 24-game improvement in the regular season, an AL pennant, and a World Series appearance in 2006. While there was some media criticism regarding Trammell's managerial strategies and "nice" demeanor, others contend that he was a rookie manager put in charge of a team that was severely lacking in talent, and believe his managerial stint played an integral role in re-instilling professionalism and pride throughout the Tigers organization. Leyland himself attributed a degree of the success that the Tigers saw in the 2006 postseason to Trammell's efforts in the three years prior.

In October 2006, Trammell returned to Comerica Park for the first time since his firing to participate, along with Sparky Anderson, in pregame festivities prior to Game 2 of the World Series. Trammell was showered with a lengthy standing ovation from Detroit baseball fans upon taking the field.

=== Chicago Cubs and Arizona Diamondbacks ===
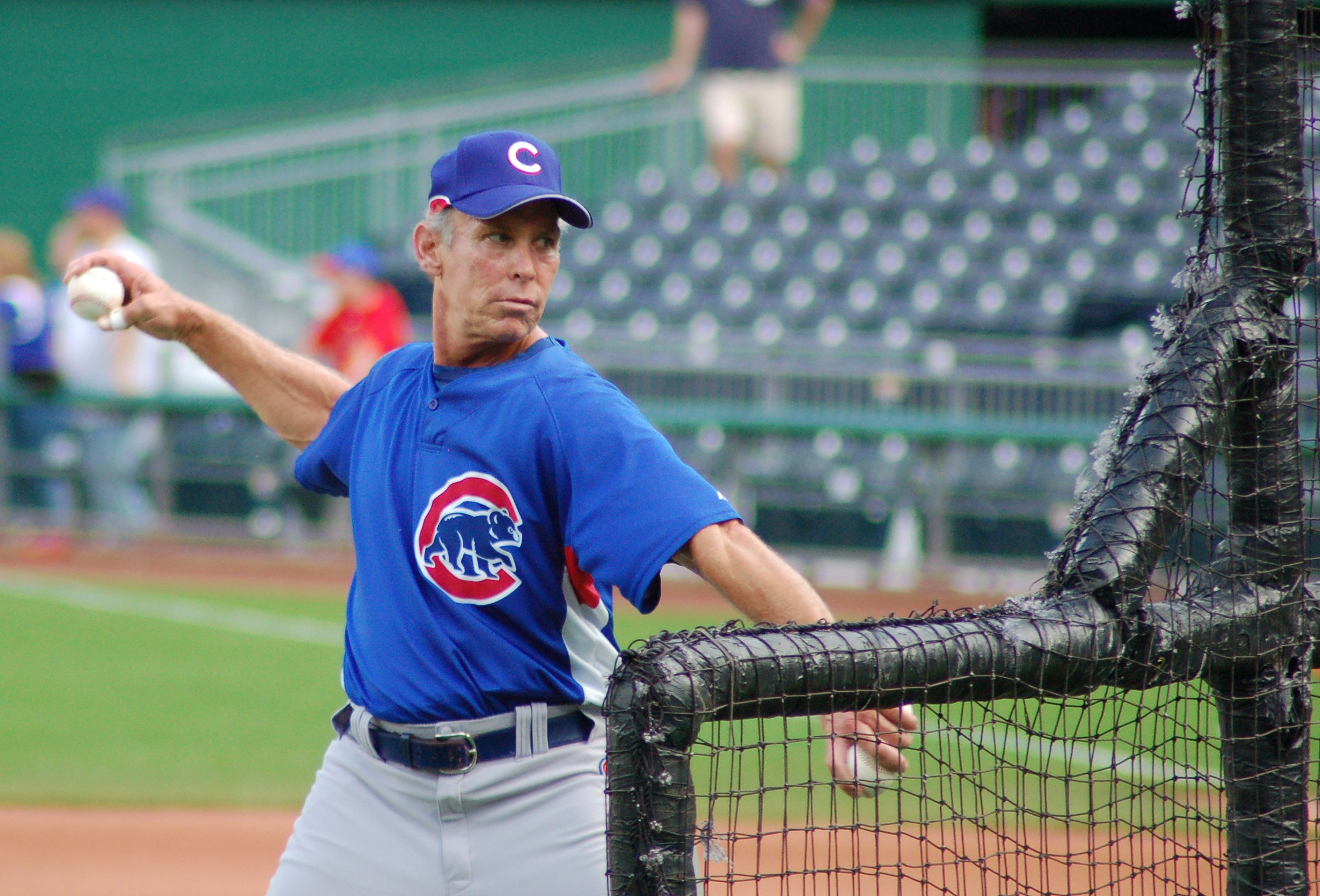
Trammell as a Chicago Cubs coach, 2009

After being replaced by Leyland, Trammell turned down an offer to stay with the Tigers as a special assistant, instead opting to sit out 2006. In October 2006, he agreed to join the Chicago Cubs as a bench coach for the 2007 season, a possible precursor to an eventual return to managing a major league club.

During the four-game suspension of Lou Piniella in 2007, Trammell was acting manager of the Chicago Cubs.

Trammell was passed over for the Cubs' managerial position when Lou Piniella retired midway through the 2010 season.

Trammell was named bench coach of the Arizona Diamondbacks in October 2010, joining his former teammate Kirk Gibson. Gibson had previously been Trammell's bench and hitting coach with the Tigers. He and Gibson were fired on September 26, 2014, though Trammell stayed on for the final three games of the season to serve as the interim manager. He had a record of one win and two losses with Arizona.

=== Return to Detroit Tigers ===
On November 3, 2014, it was announced that Trammell would return to Detroit as a special assistant to Tigers' general manager Dave Dombrowski. During the 2015 season Trammell served as interim first-base coach when Omar Vizquel temporarily left the team on bereavement leave. He wore #4 during this time, as Ian Kinsler was wearing Trammell's familiar #3. Trammell continued to serve as a special assistant to Tigers' GM Al Avila until Avila was dismissed in August 2022, and Avila was replaced as GM by Jeff Greenberg in September 2023, with Trammell maintaining his special assistant role.

=== Managerial record ===
Team	Year	Regular season					Postseason			
Team	Year	Games	Won	Lost	Win %	Finish	Won	Lost	Win %	Result
DET	2003	162	43	119	.265	5th in AL Central	–	–	–	–
DET	2004	162	72	90	.444	4th in AL Central	–	–	–	–
DET	2005	162	71	91	.438	4th in AL Central	–	–	–	–
DET total		486	186	300	.383		–	–	–	
ARI*	2014	3	1	2	.333	5th in NL West	–	–	–	–
ARI total		3	1	2	.333		–	–	–	–
Total		489	187	302	.382		–	–	–	–

== Career highlights ==
- 1984 World Series MVP
- 1984 World Series Champion
- Inducted into the Baseball Hall of Fame in 2018
- 6-time All-Star (1980, 1984, 1985, 1987, 1988, 1990)
- 4-time Gold Glove (1980, 1981, 1983, 1984)
- 3-time Top 10 MVP finisher (1984, 1987, 1988)
- 3-time Silver Slugger (1987, 1988, 1990)
- 3-time Tiger of the Year by the BBWAA-Detroit Chapter (1980, 1987, 1988)
- Comeback Player of the Year (1983)
- Collected both 200th hit of the season and 1,500th career in same at bat (October 1, 1987)
- Had a 21-game hit streak during the 1987 season.
- Had a 20-game hit streak during the 1984 season.
- Along with teammate Lou Whitaker holds AL record playing together (1,918 games). They also set the major league record by turning more double plays than any other shortstop-second baseman combination in professional baseball history.
- The Trammell–Whitaker duo twice won Gold Gloves together, joining a list of eight shortstop-second baseman duos who have won the honor in the same season while playing together (1983, 1984).
- Inducted into the National Polish-American Sports Hall of Fame in 1998
- Inducted into the San Diego Hall of Champions in 1998

== See also ==
- List of Gold Glove middle infield duos
- List of Major League Baseball career hits leaders
- List of Major League Baseball career doubles leaders
- List of Major League Baseball career runs scored leaders
- List of Major League Baseball career runs batted in leaders
- List of Major League Baseball career stolen bases leaders
- List of Major League Baseball players who spent their entire career with one franchise
- List of Major League Baseball ultimate grand slams

Sporting positions
Preceded by TBA	Detroit Tigers Hitting Coach; 1999	Succeeded by Bruce Fields
Preceded by Davey Lopes	San Diego Padres; First Base Coach; 2000–2002	Succeeded by Davey Lopes
Preceded by Dick Pole	Chicago Cubs Bench Coach; 2007–2010	Succeeded by Pat Listach
Preceded by Bo Porter	Arizona Diamondbacks Bench Coach; 2011–2015	Succeeded by Glenn Sherlock
