= Sparky Anderson =

American baseball player and manager (1934–2010)

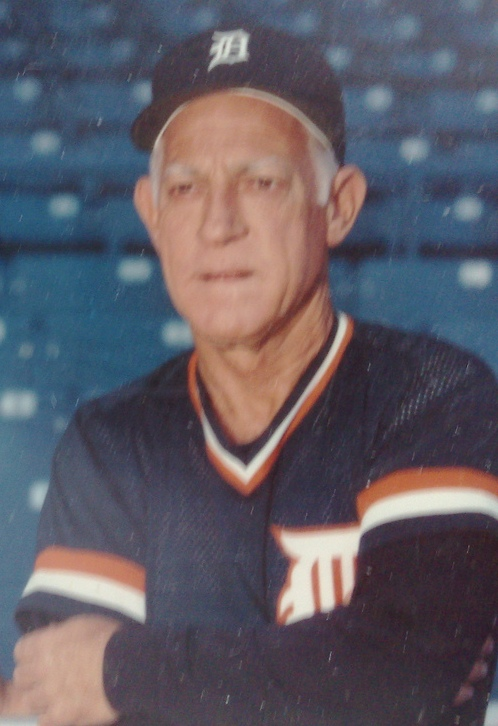
- Anderson with the Detroit Tigers, c. 1980s
- Second baseman / Manager
- Born: February 22, 1934; Bridgewater, South Dakota, U.S.
- Died: November 4, 2010 (aged 76); Thousand Oaks, California, U.S.
- Batted: Right Threw: Right

MLB debut
- April 10, 1959, for the Philadelphia Phillies

Last MLB appearance
- September 27, 1959, for the Philadelphia Phillies

MLB statistics
- Batting average: .218
- Runs batted in: 34
- Managerial record: 2,194–1,834–2
- Winning %: .545
- Stats at Baseball Reference
- Managerial record at Baseball Reference

Teams
- As player: Philadelphia Phillies (1959); As manager: Cincinnati Reds (1970–1978); Detroit Tigers (1979–1995); As coach: San Diego Padres (1969)

Career highlights and awards
- 3× World Series champion (1975, 1976, 1984); 2× AL Manager of the Year (1984, 1987); Cincinnati Reds No. 10 retired; Detroit Tigers No. 11 retired; Cincinnati Reds Hall of Fame

Member of the National

Baseball Hall of Fame
- Induction: 2000
- Election method: Veterans Committee

George Lee "Sparky" Anderson (February 22, 1934 – November 4, 2010) was an American Major League Baseball (MLB) player, coach, and manager. He managed the National League's Cincinnati Reds from 1970 to 1978 and the American League's Detroit Tigers from 1979 to 1995. Anderson managed the Reds to two World Series championships in 1975 and 1976, then added a third title in 1984 with the Tigers. Anderson was the first manager to win the World Series in both leagues. His 2,194 career wins are the seventh-most for a manager in Major League history. In his 26-year career, Anderson had only five losing seasons as manager. His 1,331 wins with the Tigers are the most for any manager in team history. Anderson was named American League Manager of the Year in 1984 and 1987. He was elected to the Baseball Hall of Fame in 2000.

== Early life ==
Anderson was born in Bridgewater, South Dakota, on February 22, 1934. He moved to Los Angeles, California, at the age of eight. He was a batboy for the USC Trojans. He attended Susan Miller Dorsey High School in Los Angeles. Upon graduating, he was signed by the Brooklyn Dodgers as an amateur free agent in 1953.

Anderson's American Legion team won the 1951 national championship, which was played in Briggs Stadium (Tiger Stadium) in Detroit.

Anderson married Carol Valle on October 3, 1953. They had first met when each was in the fifth grade.

== Playing career ==
Anderson began his playing career with the Santa Barbara Dodgers of the Class-C California League, where he was primarily used as a shortstop. In 1954, he was moved up to the class-A Pueblo Dodgers of the Western League and was moved to second base, where he played the rest of his career.

In 1955, Anderson was moved another step up the minor league ladder, playing for the Double-A Fort Worth Cats of the Texas League. A radio announcer gave him the nickname "Sparky" in 1955 for his feisty play. Although his friends and family continued to call him George, Anderson's baseball moniker would remain Sparky for the rest of his days.

In 1956, he moved up once more, this time to the Triple-A Montreal Royals of the International League. In 1957, he was assigned to the Los Angeles Angels of the open-classification Pacific Coast League. The next season, after the Dodgers' move to Los Angeles, he returned to Montreal.

After five minor league seasons without appearing in a Dodger uniform at the MLB level, he was traded to the Philadelphia Phillies on December 23, 1958, for three players, including outfielder Rip Repulski. The Phillies gave Anderson their starting second base job, and he spent what would be his one full season in the major leagues in 1959. However, he batted only .218 in 152 games, with no home runs and 34 runs batted in, and returned to the minor leagues for the remainder of his playing career.

He played the next four seasons with the Triple-A Toronto Maple Leafs in the International League. After watching several practices, Leafs owner Jack Kent Cooke observed Anderson's leadership qualities and ability to teach younger players from all backgrounds. Cooke immediately encouraged him to pursue a career in managing, offering Anderson the post for the Leafs.

== Managerial career ==
=== Minor leagues ===
In 1964, at the age of 30, Anderson accepted Cooke's offer to manage the Leafs. He later handled minor league clubs at the Class-A and Double-A levels, including a season (1968) in the Reds' minor league system.

During this period, he managed four pennant winners in four consecutive seasons: 1965 with the Rock Hill Cardinals of the Western Carolinas League, 1966 with the St. Petersburg Cardinals of the Florida State League, 1967 with the Modesto Reds of the California League, and 1968 with the Asheville Tourists of the Double-A Southern League. It was during the 1966 season that Anderson's club lost to Miami 4–3 in 29 innings, which remains the longest pro game played (by innings) without interruption.

Anderson also briefly managed in Venezuela, piloting the 1964–65 Navegantes del Magallanes; he was fired and after a 3–14 start, and replaced by Chico Carrasquel.

He made his way back to the majors in 1969 as the third-base coach of the San Diego Padres during their maiden season in the National League.

=== Cincinnati Reds ===
1970 photocard of Anderson

Just after the 1969 season ended, California Angels manager Lefty Phillips, who as a Dodger scout had signed the teenager Anderson to his first professional contract, named Anderson to his 1970 coaching staff.

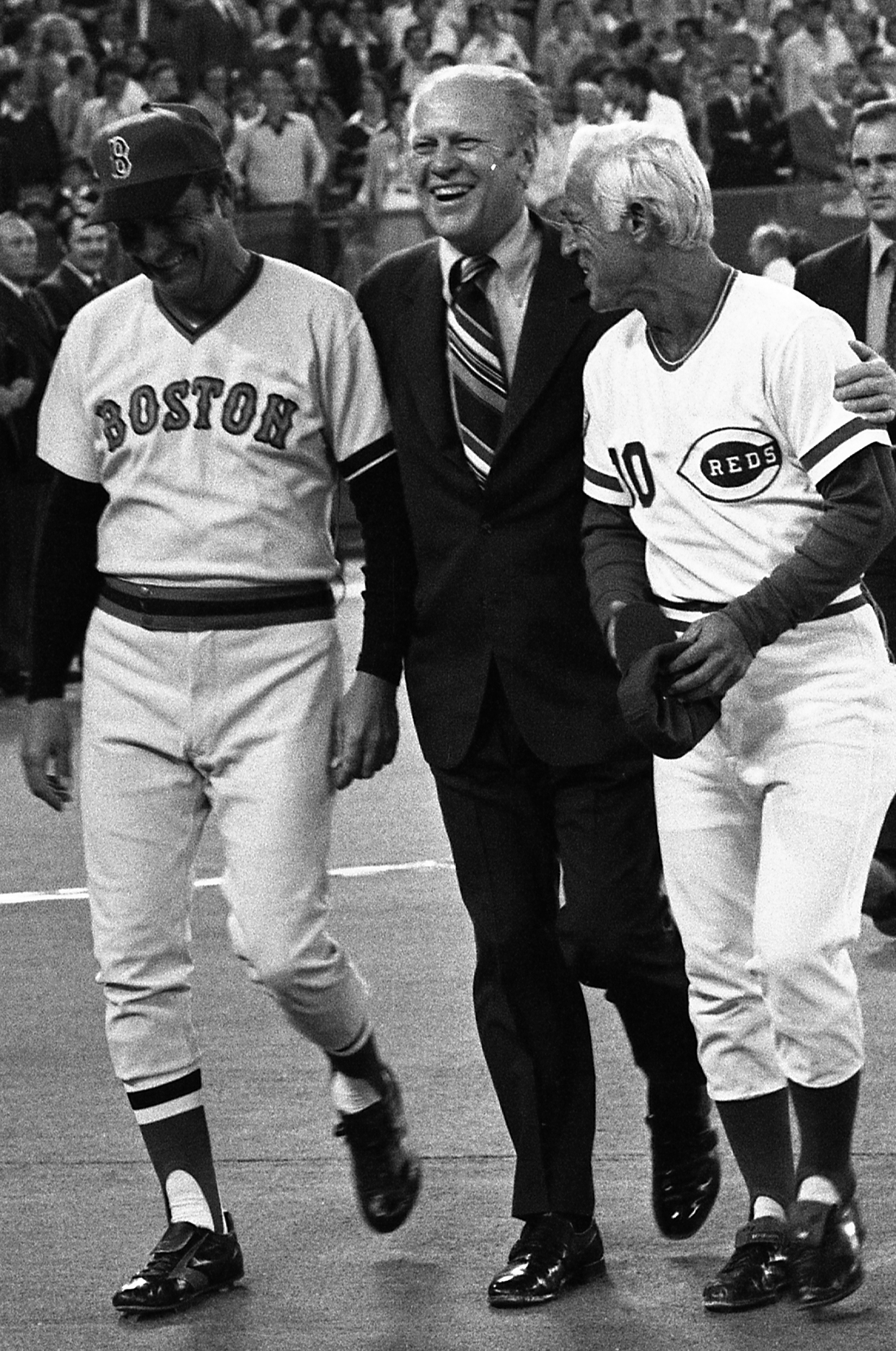
Anderson (right) with Gerald Ford and Red Sox manager Darrell Johnson at the 1976 All-Star Game

Within a day of being hired in Anaheim, he was offered the opportunity to succeed Dave Bristol as manager of the Cincinnati Reds. His appointment reunited Anderson with Reds' general manager Bob Howsam and player development director Sheldon "Chief" Bender, for whom he'd worked as a skipper in the St. Louis Cardinals and Cincinnati minor-league organizations between 1965 and 1968. Anderson was named the Reds manager on October 8, 1969. Since he was a relative unknown in the sports world, headlines on the day after his hiring read "Sparky Who?" At the time of his hiring, Anderson was, at 35, the youngest skipper in baseball. Nonetheless, Anderson would become the third manager to lead a team to 100 wins as a rookie manager, doing so by leading the Reds to 102 wins and the National League pennant in 1970, where they lost the 1970 World Series in five games to the Baltimore Orioles. During this season, the Reds came to be widely known as the Big Red Machine, a nickname they carried throughout Anderson's tenure.

After an injury-plagued 1971 season in which the team finished fourth, the Reds came back and won another pennant under Anderson in 1972, beating the Pittsburgh Pirates in five games in the NLCS, but losing to the Oakland Athletics in seven games in the World Series. They took the National League West division title again in 1973, but lost to the New York Mets in the NLCS, a hard-fought series that went the full five games.

After finishing a close second to the Los Angeles Dodgers in 1974, in 1975 the Reds blew the division open by winning 108 games. They swept the National League Championship Series and then edged the Boston Red Sox in a drama-filled, seven-game World Series. They repeated in 1976 by winning 102 games, sweeping the Phillies in three games in the National League Championship Series, then going on to sweep the New York Yankees in the Series; the only time that a team swept the League Championship Series and World Series since the start of division play. Over the course of these two seasons, Anderson's Reds compiled an astounding 14–3 record in postseason play against the Pirates, Phillies, Red Sox and Yankees, winning their last eight in a row in the postseason after beating the Red Sox in Game 7 of the 1975 World Series, and then winning seven straight games in the 1976 postseason. They remain the only team to sweep the entire post-season since the inception of the league championship series in 1969.

During this time, Anderson became known as "Captain Hook" for his penchant for taking out a starting pitcher at the first sign of weakness and going to his bullpen, relying heavily on closers Will McEnaney and Rawly Eastwick.

When the aging Reds finished second to the Dodgers in each of the next two seasons, Anderson was fired on November 27, 1978 by general manager Dick Wagner, who had taken over for Howsam a year earlier. Wagner wanted to "shake up" the Reds' coaching staff, to which Anderson objected, leading to his dismissal.

=== Detroit Tigers ===
The Detroit Tigers hired Anderson as their new manager on June 14, 1979. Upon seeing the team's young talent, he boldly proclaimed to the press that his team would be a pennant winner within five years. The Tigers became a winning club almost immediately, finishing above .500 in each of Anderson's first three full seasons, but did not get into contention until 1983, when they won 92 games and finished second to the Baltimore Orioles in the American League East.

In 1984, Detroit opened the season 9–0, was 35–5 after 40 games (a major league record), and breezed to a 104–58 record (a franchise record for wins). On September 23, Anderson became the first manager to win 100 games in a season with two different teams. They swept the Kansas City Royals in the American League Championship Series (ALCS) and then beat the San Diego Padres in five games in the World Series for Anderson's third world title. The 1984 Tigers became the first team since the 1927 New York Yankees to lead a league wire-to-wire, from opening day to the end of the World Series. After the season, Anderson won the first of his two Manager of the Year Awards with the Tigers.

After the Tigers clinched the AL East division title in 1984, Anderson wrote in his journal: "I have to be honest. I've waited for this day since they fired me in Cincinnati. I think they made a big mistake when they did that. Now no one will ever question me again."

Anderson's Tigers finished in third place in both 1985 and 1986. With a 9–5 win over the Milwaukee Brewers on July 29, 1986, Anderson became the first to achieve 600 career wins as a manager in both the American and National Leagues.

Anderson led the Tigers to the Major Leagues' best record in 1987, but the team was upset in the ALCS by the Minnesota Twins. He won his second Manager of the Year Award that year. After contending again in 1988, finishing second to Boston by one game in the AL East, the team collapsed the following year, losing a startling 103 games in 1989. During that season, Anderson took a month-long leave of absence from the team as the stress of losing wore on him. First base coach Dick Tracewski managed the team in the interim.

In 1991, the Tigers finished last in batting average, first in strikeouts and near the bottom of the league in most pitching categories, but still led their division in late August before settling for a second-place finish behind the rival Toronto Blue Jays.

On September 27, 1992, the Tigers beat the Cleveland Indians 13–3 for Anderson's 1,132nd win with the team, passing Hughie Jennings as the all-time leader in wins by a Tiger manager. Anderson continues to hold this distinction with 1,331 victories with the Tigers. On April 15, 1993, he won his 2,000th game as manager with a 3–2 victory over the Oakland Athletics, becoming the seventh manager to do so.

During his managerial career, Anderson was known to heap lavish praise on his ballplayers when talking to the media. He declared Kirk Gibson "the next Mickey Mantle," which he later acknowledged may have put too much pressure on Gibson early in his career. He said Mike Laga, who played for him in 1984, would "make us forget every power hitter who ever lived." He also said Johnny Bench, who played for him in Cincinnati, "will never throw a baseball as hard as Mike Heath," a catcher who played for him in Detroit.

Anderson is the last American League manager to date to win a game by forfeit. This came a month after being hired in Detroit when, as a result of Disco Demolition Night in Chicago, the second half of a doubleheader with the Chicago White Sox had to be called off after an anti-disco demonstration went awry and severely damaged the playing surface at Comiskey Park. Even after White Sox groundskeepers removed debris from the field, Anderson refused to let the Tigers take the field. He was not only concerned for the safety of his players, but believed the field was unplayable. When American League officials initially made plans to postpone the game until the next afternoon, Anderson demanded that the game be forfeited to the Tigers. He argued that the White Sox, as the home team, were obligated to provide acceptable playing conditions. The next day, American League President Lee MacPhail largely upheld Anderson's argument and forfeited the second game to the Tigers, 9–0.

=== Managerial record ===
Team	Year	Regular season					Postseason			
Team	Year	Games	Won	Lost	Win %	Finish	Won	Lost	Win %	Result
CIN	1970	162	102	60	.630	1st in NL West	4	4	.500	Lost World Series (BAL)
CIN	1971	162	79	83	.488	5th in NL West	–	–	–	
CIN	1972	154	95	59	.617	1st in NL West	6	6	.500	Lost World Series (OAK)
CIN	1973	162	99	63	.611	1st in NL West	2	3	.400	Lost NLCS (NYM)
CIN	1974	162	98	64	.605	2nd in NL West	–	–	–	
CIN	1975	162	108	54	.667	1st in NL West	7	3	.700	Won World Series (BOS)
CIN	1976	162	102	60	.630	1st in NL West	7	0	1.000	Won World Series (NYY)
CIN	1977	162	88	74	.543	2nd in NL West	–	–	–	
CIN	1978	161	92	69	.571	2nd in NL West	–	–	–	
CIN total		1449	863	586	.596		26	16	.619	
DET	1979	106	56	50	.528	Interim	–	–	–	
DET	1980	162	84	78	.519	5th in AL East	–	–	–	
DET	1981	52	29	23	.558	2nd in AL East	–	–	–	
DET	1981	57	31	26	.544	4th in AL East	–	–	–	
DET	1982	162	83	79	.512	4th in AL East	–	–	–	
DET	1983	162	92	70	.568	2nd in AL East	–	–	–	
DET	1984	162	104	58	.642	1st in AL East	7	1	–	Won World Series (SD)
DET	1985	161	84	77	.522	3rd in AL East	–	–	–	
DET	1986	162	87	75	.537	3rd in AL East	–	–	–	
DET	1987	162	98	64	.605	1st in AL East	1	4	–	Lost ALCS (MIN)
DET	1988	162	88	74	.543	2nd in AL East	–	–	–	
DET	1989	162	59	103	.364	7th in AL East	–	–	–	
DET	1990	162	79	83	.488	3rd in AL East	–	–	–	
DET	1991	162	84	78	.519	2nd in AL East	–	–	–	
DET	1992	162	75	87	.463	6th in AL East	–	–	–	
DET	1993	162	85	77	.525	4th in AL East	–	–	–	
DET	1994	115	53	62	.461	5th in AL East	–	–	–	
DET	1995	144	60	84	.417	4th in AL East	–	–	–	
DET total		2579	1331	1248	.516		8	5	.615	
Total		4028	2194	1834	.545		34	21	.618	

== Retirement ==
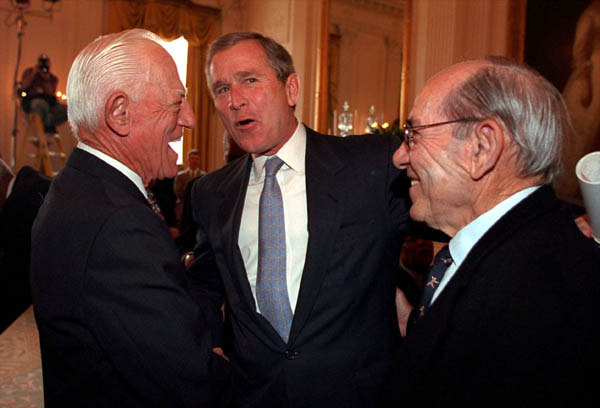
George W. Bush chats with Anderson, left, and Yogi Berra.

Anderson retired from managing on October 2, 1995, reportedly disillusioned with the state of the league following the 1994 strike that had also delayed the start of the 1995 season. It is widely believed that Anderson was pushed into retirement by the Tigers, who were unhappy that Anderson refused to manage replacement players during spring training in 1995. Speaking on Detroit's WJR radio after his retirement, Anderson said he had told his wife that season, "If this is what the game has become, it don't need me no more."

He finished with a lifetime record of 2,194–1,834, for a .545 percentage and the third-most wins for a Major League manager at the time, behind only Connie Mack and John McGraw. His win total has since been surpassed by Tony La Russa, Bobby Cox, and Joe Torre, placing him sixth on the all-time list. Anderson spent the largest portion of his career managing the Tigers, winning the World Series twice with Cincinnati and once with Detroit.

=== Post-managerial work ===
Both during his tenure with the Tigers, and for a time afterward, Anderson was a commentator and analyst on baseball broadcasts. From 1979 to 1986 (with the exception of 1984), Anderson was often paired with Vin Scully and later Jack Buck on CBS Radio's coverage of the World Series. From 1996 to 1998, he became a color commentator for the Anaheim Angels' cable television broadcasts.

While still in Detroit, Anderson founded the charitable organization CATCH (Caring Athletes Teamed for Children's and Henry Ford hospitals) in 1987, which helped to provide care for seriously ill children whose parents do not have health insurance or the means to otherwise pay for the care. He continued to support and participate in the charity well into his retirement. When interviewed in 2008, Anderson said that CATCH was "the single best thing I ever did in Detroit."

=== Honors ===
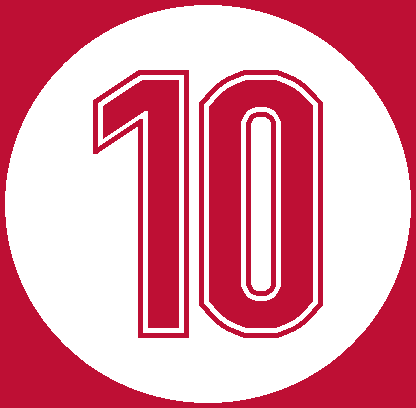
Sparky Anderson's number 10 was retired by the Cincinnati Reds in 2005.

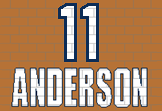
Sparky Anderson's number 11 was retired by the Detroit Tigers in 2011.

Anderson was elected to the Baseball Hall of Fame as a manager in 2000. Although he managed 17 seasons in Detroit and just 9 seasons in Cincinnati, his Hall of Fame plaque has him wearing a Cincinnati Reds uniform. He chose to wear the Reds cap at his induction in honor of former GM Bob Howsam, who gave Anderson his first chance at a major-league managing job. Before his induction, Anderson had refused to go inside the Hall because he felt unworthy, saying "I didn't ever want to go into the most precious place in the world unless I belonged." In his acceptance speech he gave a lot of credit to his players, saying there were two kinds of managers, "One, it ain't very smart. He gets bad players, loses games and gets fired. There was somebody like me that was a genius. I got good players, stayed out of the way, let 'em win a lot, and then just hung around for 26 years." He was very proud of his Hall induction, "I never wore a World Series ring ... I will wear this ring until I die."

Anderson was also inducted into the Cincinnati Reds Hall of Fame the same year. On May 28, 2005, during pre-game ceremonies in Cincinnati, Anderson's jersey number, #10, was retired by the Reds. A day in Anderson's honor was also held at Detroit's Comerica Park during the 2000 season.

On June 17, 2006, Anderson's number was retired by the Fort Worth Cats, for whom Anderson had played in 1955. In 2007, Anderson was elected to the Canadian Baseball Hall of Fame.

During the 2011 season, the Tigers honored Anderson with a patch on their right sleeves. They officially retired his No. 11 on the brick wall at Comerica Park on June 26, 2011.

== Death and legacy ==
Anderson was the first manager to win a World Series for both a National League and American League team. Either manager in the 1984 Series would have been the first to win in both leagues, since San Diego Padres (NL) manager Dick Williams had won the series with the Oakland Athletics (AL) in 1972 and 1973. Williams' 1972 club had defeated Anderson's Reds club.

Anderson's accomplishment was equaled in the 2006 World Series, when St. Louis Cardinals manager Tony La Russa – who had previously won the World Series with the Oakland Athletics in 1989, and who considers Anderson his mentor – led his team to the title over the Detroit Tigers. Coincidentally, having won a championship while managing the Florida Marlins in 1997, Tigers manager Jim Leyland could have achieved this same feat had the Tigers defeated La Russa's Cardinals in the 2006 World Series. During that series, Anderson threw out the ceremonial first pitch of Game 2 at Comerica Park, the Tigers' home park.

In 2006, construction was completed on the "Sparky Anderson Baseball Field" at California Lutheran University's new athletic complex. Anderson had used his influence to attract notable players to the university baseball team, and he was also awarded the Laundry Medal by the university for being "an inspiration to youth."

On November 3, 2010, it was announced that Anderson had been placed in hospice care at his Thousand Oaks home because of his deteriorating condition due to progressing dementia. Anderson died the next day at the age of 76 in Thousand Oaks. He was survived by his wife of 57 years, Carol, sons Lee and Albert, daughter Shirlee Engelbrecht, and eight grandchildren. Carol died at age 79 on May 7, 2013, at home in Thousand Oaks.

On June 26, 2011, the Detroit Tigers retired Anderson's number 11. Tiger players also wore commemorative patches on their uniform sleeves all season.

== Media appearances ==
- In 1979, Anderson guest-starred as himself on an episode of WKRP in Cincinnati. The episode (titled "Sparky"), features Anderson as a talk-show host on the fictional station. Eventually Anderson is let go, prompting him to say, "I must be nuts. Every time I come into this town, I get fired!"
- Anderson appeared as himself in The White Shadow season 3 episode "If Your Number's Up, Get it Down" in 1980. Falahey introduces him to Coolidge, but Coolidge replies with "Sorry you lost, but I voted for you." Coolidge mistakenly thought he was 1980 independent presidential candidate John Anderson.
- Anderson appeared as himself in the 1983 Disney Channel movie Tiger Town.

== See also ==
- List of Major League Baseball managerial wins and winning percentage leaders
- List of Major League Baseball managers with most career ejections
- Bless You Boys: Diary of the Detroit Tigers' 1984 Season

Sporting positions
Preceded by Bill Adair	Toronto Maple Leafs Manager; 1964	Succeeded by Dick Williams
Preceded by Hal Smith	Rock Hill Cardinals Manager; 1965	Succeeded by Jack Krol
Preceded by First manager	St. Petersburg Cardinals Manager; 1966	Succeeded by Ron Plaza
Preceded by Gus Niarhos	Modesto Reds Manager; 1967	Succeeded by Joe Cunningham
Preceded by Chuck Churn	Asheville Tourists Manager; 1968	Succeeded by Alex Cosmidis
Preceded by Franchise established	San Diego Padres third base coach 1969	Succeeded by Dave Garcia
