= 1977 Detroit Tigers season =

Major League Baseball season

1977 Detroit Tigers
- League: American League
- Division: East
- Ballpark: Tiger Stadium
- City: Detroit, Michigan
- Owners: John Fetzer
- General managers: Jim Campbell
- Managers: Ralph Houk
- Television: WWJ-TV (George Kell, Larry Osterman, Joe Pellegrino, Al Kaline)
- Radio: WJR (Ernie Harwell, Paul Carey)

The 1977 Detroit Tigers season was the team's 77th season and the 66th season at Tiger Stadium. The Tigers finished in fourth place in the American League East with a record of 74–88, 26 games behind the New York Yankees. They were outscored by their opponents 751 to 714. The Tigers drew 1,359,856 fans to Tiger Stadium in 1977, ranking 7th of the 14 teams in the American League.

== Offseason ==
- February 23, 1977: Tito Fuentes was signed as a free agent by the Tigers.

== Regular season ==
With 212 hits, 100 runs scored, and a .325 batting average, center fielder Ron LeFlore was the team's most valuable player, and the recipient of the "Tiger of the Year" award. First baseman Jason Thompson led the team with 31 home runs and 105 RBIs, and second baseman Tito Fuentes was the team's only other .300 hitter, with a .309 batting average and 190 hits. Designated hitter Rusty Staub also had a .278 batting average, 173 hits, 22 home runs, and 101 RBIs. Rookie Steve Kemp (the first pick in the 1976 amateur draft) hit .257 with 18 home runs and 88 RBIs.

The rookie sensation of 1976, Mark Fidrych pitched in 1977 (2.89 ERA), but tendinitis limited "The Bird" to 11 games. The pitching star of 1977 for Detroit was rookie Dave Rozema who went 15–7 with a 3.09 ERA and finished eighth in the American League Cy Young Award voting.

1977 also saw the debut of Steve Kemp (debut April 7, 1977), Dave Rozema (debut April 11, 1977), Jack Morris (debut July 26, 1977), Lance Parrish (debut September 5, 1977), Alan Trammell (debut September 9, 1977), and Lou Whitaker (debut September 9, 1977).

=== Season standings ===
AL East
| Team | W | L | Pct. | GB | Home | Road |
|---|---|---|---|---|---|---|
| New York Yankees | 100 | 62 | .617 | — | 55‍–‍26 | 45‍–‍36 |
| Baltimore Orioles | 97 | 64 | .602 | 2½ | 54‍–‍27 | 43‍–‍37 |
| Boston Red Sox | 97 | 64 | .602 | 2½ | 51‍–‍29 | 46‍–‍35 |
| Detroit Tigers | 74 | 88 | .457 | 26 | 39‍–‍42 | 35‍–‍46 |
| Cleveland Indians | 71 | 90 | .441 | 28½ | 37‍–‍44 | 34‍–‍46 |
| Milwaukee Brewers | 67 | 95 | .414 | 33 | 37‍–‍44 | 30‍–‍51 |
| Toronto Blue Jays | 54 | 107 | .335 | 45½ | 25‍–‍55 | 29‍–‍52 |

=== Record vs. opponents ===
1977 American League record Sources:
| Team | BAL | BOS | CAL | CWS | CLE | DET | KC | MIL | MIN | NYY | OAK | SEA | TEX | TOR |
|---|---|---|---|---|---|---|---|---|---|---|---|---|---|---|
| Baltimore | — | 6–8 | 5–6 | 5–5 | 11–4 | 12–3 | 4–7 | 11–4 | 6–4 | 8–7 | 8–2 | 7–3 | 4–6 | 10–5 |
| Boston | 8–6 | — | 7–3 | 3–7 | 8–7 | 9–6 | 5–5 | 9–6 | 4–6 | 8–7 | 8–3 | 10–1 | 6–4 | 12–3 |
| California | 6–5 | 3–7 | — | 8–7 | 6–4 | 4–6 | 6–9 | 5–5 | 7–8 | 4–7 | 5–10 | 9–6 | 5–10 | 6–4 |
| Chicago | 5–5 | 7–3 | 7–8 | — | 6–4 | 4–6 | 8–7 | 6–5 | 10–5 | 3–7 | 10–5 | 10–5 | 6–9 | 8–3 |
| Cleveland | 4–11 | 7–8 | 4–6 | 4–6 | — | 8–7 | 3–7 | 11–4 | 2–9 | 3–12 | 7–3 | 7–3 | 2–9 | 9–5 |
| Detroit | 3–12 | 6–9 | 6–4 | 6–4 | 7–8 | — | 3–8 | 10–5 | 5–5 | 6–9 | 5–5 | 5–6 | 2–8 | 10–5 |
| Kansas City | 7–4 | 5–5 | 9–6 | 7–8 | 7–3 | 8–3 | — | 8–2 | 10–5 | 5–5 | 9–6 | 11–4 | 8–7 | 8–2 |
| Milwaukee | 4–11 | 6–9 | 5–5 | 5–6 | 4–11 | 5–10 | 2–8 | — | 3–8 | 8–7 | 5–5 | 7–3 | 5–5 | 8–7 |
| Minnesota | 4–6 | 6–4 | 8–7 | 5–10 | 9–2 | 5–5 | 5–10 | 8–3 | — | 2–8 | 8–6 | 7–8 | 8–7 | 9–1 |
| New York | 7–8 | 7–8 | 7–4 | 7–3 | 12–3 | 9–6 | 5–5 | 7–8 | 8–2 | — | 9–2 | 6–4 | 7–3 | 9–6 |
| Oakland | 2–8 | 3–8 | 10–5 | 5–10 | 3–7 | 5–5 | 6–9 | 5–5 | 6–8 | 2–9 | — | 7–8 | 2–13 | 7–3 |
| Seattle | 3–7 | 1–10 | 6–9 | 5–10 | 3–7 | 6–5 | 4–11 | 3–7 | 8–7 | 4–6 | 8–7 | — | 9–6 | 4–6 |
| Texas | 6–4 | 4–6 | 10–5 | 9–6 | 9–2 | 8–2 | 7–8 | 5–5 | 7–8 | 3–7 | 13–2 | 6–9 | — | 7–4 |
| Toronto | 5–10 | 3–12 | 4–6 | 3–8 | 5–9 | 5–10 | 2–8 | 7–8 | 1–9 | 6–9 | 3–7 | 6–4 | 4–7 | — |

=== Notable transactions ===
- April 12, 1977: Willie Horton was traded by the Tigers to the Texas Rangers for Steve Foucault.

=== Roster ===
1977 Detroit Tigers
Roster
| Pitchers: 36 Fernando Arroyo; 21 Ray Bare; 28 Jim Crawford; 20 Mark Fidrych; 29 Steve Foucault; 48 Ed Glynn; 49 Steve Grilli; 18 John Hiller; 47 Jack Morris; 17 Dave Roberts; 19 Dave Rozema; 31 Vern Ruhle; 27 Bob Sykes; 32 Bruce Taylor; 39 Milt Wilcox | Catchers: 11 Bruce Kimm; 12 Milt May; 13 Lance Parrish; 14 John Wockenfuss; Infielders: 40 Bob Adams; 15 Luis Alvarado; 44 Tito Fuentes; 2 Phil Mankowski; 4 Aurelio Rodríguez; 9 Chuck Scrivener; 30 Jason Thompson; 42 Alan Trammell; 7 Tom Veryzer; 5 Mark Wagner; 43 Lou Whitaker | Outfielders: 25 Tim Corcoran; 23 Willie Horton; 33 Steve Kemp; 8 Ron LeFlore; 22 Ben Oglivie; 24 Mickey Stanley; Other batters: 34 Bob Molinaro; 10 Rusty Staub | Manager: 35 Ralph Houk; Coaches: 52 Fred Gladding; 51 Fred Hatfield; 50 Jim Hegan; 53 Dick Tracewski |

== Player stats ==
| = Indicates team leader |

=== Batting ===
==== Starters by position ====
Note: Pos = Position; G = Games played; AB = At bats; H = Hits; Avg. = Batting average; HR = Home runs; RBI = Runs batted in

| Pos | Player | G | AB | H | Avg. | HR | RBI |
|---|---|---|---|---|---|---|---|
| C | Milt May | 115 | 397 | 99 | .249 | 12 | 46 |
| 1B | Jason Thompson | 158 | 585 | 158 | .270 | 31 | 105 |
| 2B | Tito Fuentes | 151 | 615 | 190 | .309 | 5 | 51 |
| 3B | Aurelio Rodríguez | 96 | 306 | 67 | .219 | 10 | 32 |
| SS | Tom Veryzer | 125 | 350 | 69 | .197 | 2 | 28 |
| CF | Ron LeFlore | 154 | 652 | 212 | .325 | 16 | 57 |
| LF | Steve Kemp | 151 | 552 | 142 | .257 | 18 | 88 |
| RF | Ben Oglivie | 132 | 450 | 118 | .262 | 21 | 61 |
| DH | Rusty Staub | 158 | 623 | 173 | .278 | 22 | 101 |

==== Other batters ====
Note: G = Games played; AB = At bats; H = Hits; Avg. = Batting average; HR = Home runs; RBI = Runs batted in

| Player | G | AB | H | Avg. | HR | RBI |
|---|---|---|---|---|---|---|
| Phil Mankowski | 94 | 286 | 79 | .276 | 3 | 27 |
| Mickey Stanley | 75 | 222 | 51 | .230 | 8 | 23 |
| John Wockenfuss | 53 | 164 | 45 | .274 | 9 | 25 |
| Tim Corcoran | 55 | 103 | 29 | .282 | 3 | 15 |
| Chuck Scrivener | 61 | 72 | 6 | .083 | 0 | 2 |
| Mark Wagner | 22 | 48 | 7 | .146 | 1 | 3 |
| Lance Parrish | 12 | 46 | 9 | .196 | 3 | 7 |
| Alan Trammell | 19 | 43 | 8 | .186 | 0 | 0 |
| Lou Whitaker | 11 | 32 | 8 | .250 | 0 | 2 |
| Bruce Kimm | 14 | 25 | 2 | .080 | 0 | 1 |
| Bob Adams | 15 | 24 | 6 | .250 | 2 | 2 |
| Willie Horton | 1 | 4 | 1 | .250 | 0 | 0 |
| Bob Molinaro | 4 | 4 | 1 | .250 | 0 | 0 |
| Luis Alvarado | 2 | 1 | 0 | .000 | 0 | 0 |

=== Pitching ===
==== Starting pitchers ====
Note: G = Games; IP = Innings pitched; W = Wins; L = Losses; ERA = Earned run average; SO = Strikeouts

| Player | G | IP | W | L | ERA | SO |
|---|---|---|---|---|---|---|
| Dave Rozema | 28 | 218.1 | 15 | 7 | 3.09 | 92 |
| Fernando Arroyo | 38 | 209.1 | 8 | 18 | 4.17 | 60 |
| Dave Roberts | 22 | 129.1 | 4 | 10 | 5.15 | 46 |
| Mark Fidrych | 11 | 81.0 | 6 | 4 | 2.89 | 42 |
| Vern Ruhle | 14 | 66.1 | 3 | 5 | 5.70 | 27 |
| Jack Morris | 7 | 45.2 | 1 | 1 | 3.74 | 28 |
| Ray Bare | 5 | 14.1 | 0 | 2 | 12.56 | 4 |

==== Other pitchers ====
Note: G = Games pitched; IP = Innings pitched; W = Wins; L = Losses; ERA = Earned run average; SO = Strikeouts

| Player | G | IP | W | L | ERA | SO |
|---|---|---|---|---|---|---|
| Bob Sykes | 32 | 132.2 | 5 | 7 | 4.41 | 58 |
| Jim Crawford | 37 | 126.0 | 7 | 8 | 4.79 | 91 |
| Milt Wilcox | 20 | 106.1 | 6 | 2 | 3.64 | 82 |
| Ed Glynn | 8 | 27.1 | 2 | 1 | 5.27 | 13 |

==== Relief pitchers ====
Note: G = Games pitched; W = Wins; L = Losses; SV = Saves; GF = Games finished; ERA = Earned run average; SO = Strikeouts

| Player | G | W | L | SV | GF | ERA | SO |
|---|---|---|---|---|---|---|---|
| Steve Foucault | 44 | 7 | 7 | 13 | 34 | 3.15 | 58 |
| John Hiller | 45 | 8 | 14 | 7 | 27 | 3.56 | 115 |
| Steve Grilli | 30 | 1 | 2 | 0 | 13 | 4.83 | 49 |
| Bruce Taylor | 19 | 1 | 0 | 2 | 12 | 3.38 | 19 |

== Awards and honors ==
All-Star Game

- Mark Fidrych, Pitcher, Reserve (Second All-Star appearance)
- Jason Thompson, First Base, Reserve (First All-Star appearance)

=== Award winners ===
Ron LeFlore

- Tiger of the Year Award from the Detroit baseball writers
- Finished 20th in AL MVP voting

Dave Rozema

- Finished 8th in the AL Cy Young Award voting

Jason Thompson

- Finished 21st in AL MVP voting

==== All-Stars ====
Jason Thompson, reserve

=== League top ten finishers ===
Fernando Arroyo

- #4 in AL in losses (18)

Mark Fidrych

- AL All Star Team, pitcher

Tito Fuentes

- AL leader in innings played at second base (1327)
- AL leader in putouts at second base (379)
- AL leader in double plays at second base (115)
- AL leader in errors at second base (26)
- AL leader in complete games at second base (144)
- #2 in AL in singles (156)
- #8 in AL in hits (190)
- #8 in AL in triples (10)
- #9 in AL in sacrifice hits (13)

Steve Kemp

- AL leader in games in left field (148)
- AL leader in complete games in left field (146)
- AL leader in innings played in left field (1316)

Ron LeFlore

- AL leader in assists by a center fielder (12)
- #2 in AL in hits (212)
- #2 in AL in singles (156)
- #2 in AL in at bats (652)
- #2 in AL in singles (156)
- #2 in AL in times caught stealing (19)
- #4 in AL in plate appearances (698)
- #4 in AL in strikeouts (121) (tied with Tito Fuentes)
- #5 in AL in batting average (.325)
- #5 in AL in stolen bases (39)
- #5 in AL in total bases (310)
- #6 in AL in Power/Speed Number (22.7)
- #8 in AL in triples (10)
- #8 in AL in times on base (253)
- #9 in AL in runs scored (100)
- #9 in AL in outs (475)
- #10 in AL in runs created (110)

Dave Rozema

- AL leader in bases on balls per 9 innings pitched (1.40)
- #5 in AL in Adjusted ERA+ (138)
- #6 in AL in strikeout to walk ratio (2.71)
- #7 in AL in ERA (3.09)
- #8 in AL in complete games (16)
- #9 in AL in win percentage (.682)

Rusty Staub

- #1 in AL in times grounded into double plays (27)
- #2 in AL in outs (490)
- #3 in AL in sacrifice flies (10)
- #5 in AL in plate appearances (695)
- #7 in AL in at bats per strikeout (13.3)
- #8 in AL in doubles (34)

Jason Thompson

- #6 in AL in home runs (31)
- #6 in AL in sacrifice flies (9)
- #8 in AL in RBIs (105)

Alan Trammell

- Youngest player in the AL (19)

=== Players ranking among top 100 all time at position ===
The following members of the 1977 Detroit Tigers are among the Top 100 of all time at their position, as ranked by The Bill James Historical Baseball Abstract in 2001:

- Lance Parrish: 19th best catcher of all time (played 12 games as a rookie)
- Lou Whitaker: 13th best second baseman of all time (played 11 games as a rookie)
- Alan Trammell: 9th best shortstop of all time (played 19 games as a rookie)
- Aurelio Rodríguez: 91st best third baseman of all time
- Ron LeFlore: 80th best center fielder of all time
- Ben Oglivie: 64th best left fielder of all time
- Willie Horton: 55th best left fielder of all time (played one game for 1977 Tigers)

== Farm system ==
| Level | Team | League | Manager |
|---|---|---|---|
| AAA | Evansville Triplets | American Association | Les Moss |
| AA | Montgomery Rebels | Southern League | Eddie Brinkman |
| A | Lakeland Tigers | Florida State League | Jim Leyland |
| Rookie | Bristol Tigers | Appalachian League | Joe Lewis |

LEAGUE CHAMPIONS: Montgomery, Lakeland, Bristol
