= 1979 Detroit Tigers season =

Major League Baseball season

1979 Detroit Tigers
- League: American League
- Division: East
- Ballpark: Tiger Stadium
- City: Detroit, Michigan
- Owners: John Fetzer
- General managers: Jim Campbell
- Managers: Les Moss, Dick Tracewski, Sparky Anderson
- Television: WDIV-TV (George Kell, Mike Barry, Al Kaline)
- Radio: WJR (Ernie Harwell, Paul Carey)

The 1979 Detroit Tigers season was the team's 79th season and the 68th season at Tiger Stadium. The Tigers finished in fifth place in the American League East with a record of 85–76, 18 games behind the Orioles. They outscored their opponents 770 to 738. The Tigers drew 1,630,929 fans to Tiger Stadium in 1979, ranking 7th of the 14 teams in the American League. This season is most notable for both the Tigers' involvement in the infamous Disco Demolition Night, of which they were the visiting team to the Chicago White Sox and declared winners by forfeit, as well as for their mid-season hiring of Sparky Anderson as manager. Anderson would manage the Tigers through the end of the 1995 season, winning the 1984 World Series along with two American League Eastern Division titles in 1984 and 1987.

== Offseason ==
- March 20, 1979: Steve Dillard was traded by the Tigers to the Chicago Cubs for a player to be named later. The Cubs completed the deal by sending Ed Putman to the Tigers on March 24.

== Regular season ==
=== Season standings ===
AL East
Team	W	L	Pct.	GB	Home	Road
Baltimore Orioles	102	57	.642	—	55‍–‍24	47‍–‍33
Milwaukee Brewers	95	66	.590	8	52‍–‍29	43‍–‍37
Boston Red Sox	91	69	.569	11½	51‍–‍29	40‍–‍40
New York Yankees	89	71	.556	13½	51‍–‍30	38‍–‍41
Detroit Tigers	85	76	.528	18	46‍–‍34	39‍–‍42
Cleveland Indians	81	80	.503	22	47‍–‍34	34‍–‍46
Toronto Blue Jays	53	109	.327	50½	32‍–‍49	21‍–‍60

=== Record vs. opponents ===
1979 American League record Sources:
Team	BAL	BOS	CAL	CWS	CLE	DET	KC	MIL	MIN	NYY	OAK	SEA	TEX	TOR
Baltimore	—	8–5	9–3	8–3	8–5	7–6	6–6	8–5	8–4	5–6	8–4	10–2	6–6	11–2
Boston	5–8	—	5–7	5–6	6–7	8–5	8–4	8–4	9–3	5–8	9–3	8–4	6–6	9–4
California	3–9	7–5	—	9–4	6–6	4–8	7–6	7–5	9–4	7–5	10–3	7–6	5–8	7–5
Chicago	3–8	6–5	4–9	—	6–6	3–9	5–8	5–7	5–8	4–8	9–4	5–8	11–2	7–5
Cleveland	5–8	7–6	6–6	6–6	—	6–6	6–6	4–9	8–4	5–8	8–4	7–5	5–7	8–5
Detroit	6–7	5–8	8–4	9–3	6–6	—	5–7	6–7	4–8	7–6	7–5	7–5	6–6	9–4
Kansas City	6–6	4–8	6–7	8–5	6–6	7–5	—	5–7	7–6	5–7	9–4	7–6	6–7	9–3
Milwaukee	5–8	4–8	5–7	7–5	9–4	7–6	7–5	—	8–4	9–4	6–6	9–3	9–3	10–3
Minnesota	4–8	3–9	4–9	8–5	4–8	8–4	6–7	4–8	—	7–5	9–4	10–3	4–9	11–1
New York	6–5	8–5	5–7	8–4	8–5	6–7	7–5	4–9	5–7	—	9–3	6–6	8–4	9–4
Oakland	4–8	3–9	3–10	4–9	4–8	5–7	4–9	6–6	4–9	3–9	—	8–5	2–11	4–8
Seattle	2–10	4–8	6–7	8–5	5–7	5–7	6–7	3–9	3–10	6–6	5–8	—	6–7	8–4
Texas	6–6	6–6	8–5	2–11	7–5	6–6	7–6	3–9	9–4	4–8	11–2	7–6	—	7–5
Toronto	2–11	4–9	5–7	5–7	5–8	4–9	3–9	3–10	1–11	4–9	8–4	4–8	5–7	—

=== Notable transactions ===
- May 25, 1979: The Tigers traded a player to be named later to the Cincinnati Reds for Champ Summers. The Tigers completed the deal by sending Sheldon Burnside to the Reds on October 25.
- June 5, 1979: University of Michigan football quarterback Rick Leach was drafted by the Detroit Tigers in the 1st round (13th pick) of the 1979 Major League Baseball draft.
- July 20, 1979: Rusty Staub was traded by the Tigers to the Montreal Expos for a player to be named later and cash. The Expos completed the deal by sending Randy Schafer (minors) to the Tigers on December 3.

=== Roster ===
1979 Detroit Tigers
Roster
Pitchers: 36 Fernando Arroyo; 31 Steve Baker; 41 Jack Billingham; 42 Sheldon Burnside; 43 Mike Chris; 20 Mark Fidrych; 18 John Hiller; 29 Aurelio López; 47 Jack Morris; 46 Dan Petry; 48 Bruce Robbins; 19 Dave Rozema; 32 Bruce Taylor; 38 Dave Tobik; 40 Pat Underwood; 39 Milt Wilcox; 37 Kip Young	Catchers: 12 Milt May; 13 Lance Parrish; 12 Ed Putman; Infielders: 16 Tom Brookens; 9 Dave Machemer; 2 Phil Mankowski; 32 Rick Peters; 4 Aurelio Rodríguez; 30 Jason Thompson; 3 Alan Trammell; 5 Mark Wagner; 1 Lou Whitaker; 14 John Wockenfuss	Outfielders: 25 Tim Corcoran; 23 Kirk Gibson; 34 Dan Gonzales; 21 Al Greene; 35 Lynn Jones; 33 Steve Kemp; 8 Ron LeFlore; 27 Jerry Morales; 22 Dave Stegman; 24 Champ Summers; Other batters: 10 Rusty Staub	Manager: 7,11 Sparky Anderson; 54 Les Moss; 53 Dick Tracewski; Coaches: 51 Ed Brinkman; 26 Gates Brown; 50 Billy Consolo; 52 Johnny Grodzicki; 53 Dick Tracewski

== Player stats ==
= Indicates team leader

=== Batting ===
==== Starters by position ====
Note: Pos = Position; G = Games played; AB = At bats; H = Hits; Avg. = Batting average; HR = Home runs; RBI = Runs batted in

Pos	Player	G	AB	H	Avg.	HR	RBI
C	Lance Parrish	143	493	136	.276	19	65
1B	Jason Thompson	145	492	121	.246	20	79
2B	Lou Whitaker	127	423	121	.286	3	42
3B	Aurelio Rodríguez	106	343	87	.254	5	36
SS	Alan Trammell	142	460	127	.276	6	50
LF	Steve Kemp	134	490	156	.318	26	105
RF	Jerry Morales	129	440	93	.211	14	56
CF	Ron LeFlore	148	600	180	.300	9	57
DH	Rusty Staub	68	246	58	.236	9	40

==== Other batters ====
Note: G = Games played; AB = At bats; H = Hits; Avg. = Batting average; HR = Home runs; RBI = Runs batted in

Player	G	AB	H	Avg.	HR	RBI
Champ Summers	90	246	77	.313	20	51
John Wockenfuss	87	231	61	.264	15	46
Lynn Jones	95	213	63	.296	4	26
Tom Brookens	60	190	50	.263	4	21
Mark Wagner	75	146	40	.274	1	13
Phil Mankowski	42	99	22	.222	0	8
Al Greene	29	59	8	.136	3	6
Ed Putman	21	39	9	.231	2	4
Kirk Gibson	12	38	9	.237	1	4
Dave Stegman	12	31	6	.194	3	5
Dave Machemer	19	26	5	.192	0	2
Tim Corcoran	18	22	5	.227	0	6
Rick Peters	10	19	5	.263	0	2
Dan Gonzales	7	18	4	.222	0	2
Milt May	6	11	3	.273	0	3

=== Pitching ===
==== Starting pitchers ====
Note: G = Games; IP = Innings pitched; W = Wins; L = Losses; ERA = Earned run average; SO = Strikeouts

Player	G	IP	W	L	ERA	SO
Jack Morris	27	197.2	17	7	3.28	113
Milt Wilcox	33	196.1	12	10	4.35	109
Dan Petry	15	98.0	6	5	3.95	43
Dave Rozema	16	97.1	4	4	3.51	33
Bruce Robbins	10	46.0	3	3	3.91	22
Mark Fidrych	4	14.2	0	3	10.43	5

==== Other pitchers ====
Note: G = Games; IP = Innings pitched; W = Wins; L = Losses; ERA = Earned run average; SO = Strikeouts

Player	G	IP	W	L	ERA	SO
Jack Billingham	35	158.0	10	7	3.30	59
Pat Underwood	27	121.2	6	4	4.59	83
Steve Baker	21	84.0	1	7	6.64	54
Kip Young	13	43.2	2	2	6.39	22
Mike Chris	13	39.0	3	3	6.92	31

==== Relief pitchers ====
Note: G = Games pitched; W = Wins; L= Losses; SV = Saves; GF = Games finished; ERA = Earned run average; SO = Strikeouts

Player	G	W	L	SV	GF	ERA	SO
Aurelio López	61	10	5	21	49	2.41	106
John Hiller	43	4	7	9	30	5.22	46
Dave Tobik	37	3	5	3	19	4.33	48
Sheldon Burnside	10	1	1	0	2	6.33	13
Bruce Taylor	10	1	2	0	8	4.82	8
Fernando Arroyo	6	1	1	0	3	8.25	7

== Awards and honors ==
- Steve Kemp, Tiger of the Year Award, from Detroit baseball writers

=== All-Stars ===
- Steve Kemp, reserve

=== League top ten finishes ===
Steve Kemp

- #4 in AL in OPS (.939)
- #8 in AL in batting average (.318)

Ron LeFlore

- #2 in MLB in stolen bases (78)
- #3 in AL in singles (139)
- #4 in AL in times caught stealing (14)
- #5 in AL in triples (10)
- #7 in AL in runs scored (110)

Aurelio López

- #3 in AL in saves (21)
- #5 in AL in games finished (49)

Jack Morris

- #4 in AL in Adjusted ERA+ (133)
- #5 in AL in ERA (3.28)
- #5 in AL in wins (17)
- #5 in AL win percentage (.708)
- #4 in AL in hits allowed per 9 innings (8.15)

Bruce Robbins

- 3rd youngest player in the AL

Alan Trammell

- #4 in AL in times caught stealing (14)

Milt Wilcox

- #2 in MLB in hit batsmen (11)

=== Players ranking among top 100 all time at position ===
The following members of the 1979 Detroit Tigers are among the Top 100 of all time at their position, as ranked by The Bill James Historical Baseball Abstract in 2001:

- Lance Parrish: 19th best catcher of all time (played 12 games as a rookie)
- Lou Whitaker: 13th best second baseman of all time (played 11 games as a rookie)
- Alan Trammell: 9th best shortstop of all time (played 19 games as a rookie)
- Aurelio Rodríguez: 91st best third baseman of all time
- Ron LeFlore: 80th best center fielder of all time

== Farm system ==
Level	Team	League	Manager
AAA	Evansville Triplets	American Association	Jim Leyland
AA	Montgomery Rebels	Southern League	Dennis Sommers
A	Lakeland Tigers	Florida State League	Fred Hatfield
Rookie	Bristol Tigers	Appalachian League	Joe Lewis

LEAGUE CHAMPIONS: Evansville
