= 1976 Detroit Tigers season =

Major League Baseball season

1976 Detroit Tigers
- League: American League
- Division: East
- Ballpark: Tiger Stadium
- City: Detroit, Michigan
- Owners: John Fetzer
- General managers: Jim Campbell
- Managers: Ralph Houk
- Television: WWJ-TV (George Kell, Larry Osterman, Don Kremer, Al Kaline)
- Radio: WJR (Ernie Harwell, Paul Carey)

The 1976 Detroit Tigers season was the 76th season for the Detroit Tigers competing in Major League Baseball as a member of the American League. In their third season under manager Ralph Houk, the Tigers compiled a 74–87 record and finished in fifth place in the American League East, 24 games behind the New York Yankees. The team improved by 17 wins over its 1975 performance for the largest improvement by any team in the American League. The team played its home games at Tiger Stadium and attracted 1,467,020 fans, ranking fourth of the 12 teams in the American League.

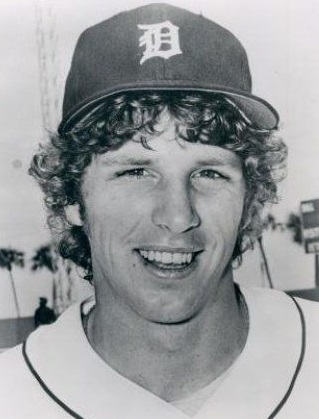
1976 "Tiger of the Year" Mark Fidrych

Rookie pitcher Mark Fidrych, known as "The Bird", became a sensation throughout baseball, both for his pitching prowess and for his unusual practices in talking to the ball and grooming the pitcher's mound. Fidrych finished the 1976 season with a 19-9 win–loss record and led the American League with a 2.34 earned run average (ERA). Fidrych won the American League Rookie of the Year and "Tiger of the Year" awards and finished second in the voting for the Cy Young Award.

The team's batting leaders included center fielder Ron LeFlore with a .316 batting average and 58 stolen bases, Jason Thompson with 17 home runs, and Rusty Staub with 96 RBIs and a .386 on-base percentage. Third baseman Aurelio Rodriguez also won the American League Gold Glove Award, breaking Brooks Robinson's streak of winning the award for 17 consecutive years.

== Preseason ==
The 1975 Detroit Tigers compiled the worst record (57–102) in Major League Baseball and up to that time the worst season in franchise history. The team's poor performance prompted two major trades during the December 1975 Winter Meetings.

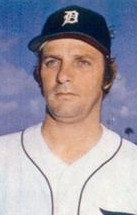
Pitcher Dave Roberts

- On December 6, 1975, in their first major move, the Tigers dealt their starting right fielder, Leon Roberts, and three other players (backup catcher Terry Humphrey rookie pitcher Gene Pentz and at-that-time minor league pitcher Mark Lemongello) to the Houston Astros in exchange for catcher Milt May, starting pitcher Dave Roberts, and relief pitcher Jim Crawford. Dave Roberts ended up leading the 1976 Tigers with 36 starts and 252 innings pitched. May began the season as the Tigers' starting catcher but fractured his ankle running into a wall in Oakland on April 20.
- Six days later, on December 12, 1975, the Tigers traded Mickey Lolich, the winningest left-handed pitcher in Detroit history, and rookie outfielder Billy Baldwin to the New York Mets for outfielder Rusty Staub and minor league pitcher Bill Laxton. Lolich initially vetoed the trade, but consented after receiving financial concessions from the Mets. Detroit general manager Jim Campbell said of the trade, "We got the one thing we were looking for -- a real sound RBI man." Staub led the 1976 Tigers with 96 RBIs and was a key component in the team's 1976 turnaround.

The Tigers also brought in new talent through the draft. On January 7, 1976, the team drafted outfielder Steve Kemp with the No. 1 overall pick in the January phase of the MLB draft. Kemp spent the 1976 season in the minors but became the Tigers' starting left fielder from 1977 to 1981.

The most significant preseason move involved the surprise promotion of little known pitcher Mark Fidrych. On April 5, 1976, the team announced that Fidrych would start the season with the team. He had not even been on the major league roster prior to the announcement.

== Regular season ==
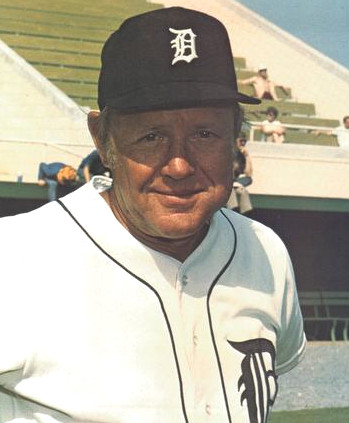
Manager Ralph Houk

=== Season chronology ===
==== April ====
- April 10: The Tigers opened the season with a 3–1 victory over the Cleveland Indians. Starter Joe Coleman got the win and John Hiller the save. Willie Horton hit a towering two-run home run in the third inning. The game was played in Cleveland's Municipal Stadium and drew a crowd of 65,000, the largest opening day crowd in the majors during the 1976 season.
- April 13: The Tigers lost their home opener by a 1–0 score against the Milwaukee Brewers before a crowd of 48,612 at Tiger Stadium. Detroit starter Ray Bare shut out the Brewers through eight innings, but Milwaukee scored the game-winning run in the ninth inning off reliever John Hiller. Jim Slaton pithed a two-hitter for the Brewers.
- April 14: Four Tigers were listed on the ballot for the 1976 American League All-Star team. Outfielder Ron LeFlore and second baseman Gary Sutherland were listed on the ballot for the first time. Outfielder Rusty Staub and catcher Milt May had previously been listed on the National League ballot.
- April 17: The Tigers defeated the California Angels, 2–0, in Anaheim. In his American League debut, Dave Roberts pitched a complete-game shutout, had a no-hitter through six innings, and allowed only two singles.
- April 20: Mark Fidrych appeared in his first major league game. Milt May‚ acquired by the Tigers in December‚ broke his ankle crashing into the wall behind home plate while chasing a foul ball. He did not play for the remainder of the season.
- April 28: The Tigers defeated the Oakland A's, 8–1. Dave Roberts pitched a two-hitter and won his third consecutive game for the Tigers.

==== May ====
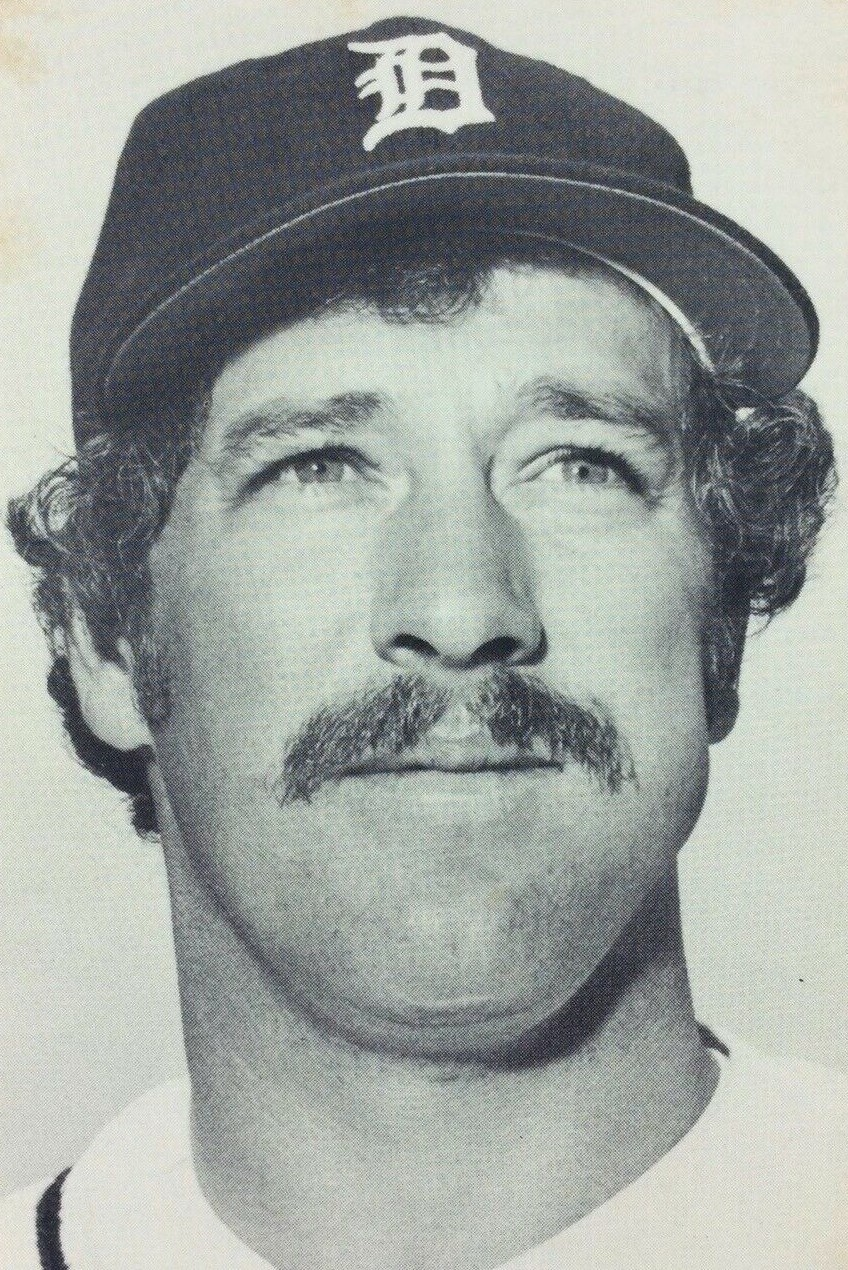
John Wockenfuss

- May 15: Mark Fidrych won his first major league start. Fidrych pitched a complete game, allowing only two hits in a 2–1 victory over the Indians. Fidrych took a no-hitter through six innings, but gave up a single to Buddy Bell in the seventh. Aside from his fine pitching, Fidrych drew attention for talking to the ball during the game‚ and patting down the mound each inning. Tom Veryzer had the game-winning RBI for Detroit with a sacrifice fly in the fourth inning.
- May 25: Mark Fidrych pitched well in his second start, holding the Red Sox to six hits and two runs, but the Tigers were shut out, 2–0, by Luis Tiant.
- May 28: After hitting safely in 30 straight games since April 17, Ron LeFlore went hitless in a 9–5 loss to the Yankees. LeFlore's hitting streak tied the third longest in team history.
- May 31: Manager Ralph Houk let rookie Mark Fidrych go 11 innings for a complete game, 5–4 win over the Brewers. Fidrych gave up a run in the top of the 11th inning, but the Tigers rallied in the bottom of the 11th on singles by Chuck Scrivener, Jerry Manuel, and Tom Veryzer. Ron LeFlore had two triples in the game.

==== June ====
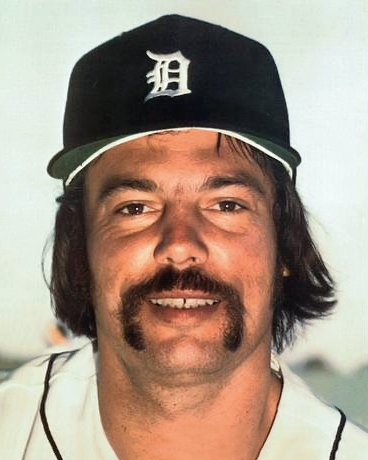
Pitcher John Hiller

- June 1: John Hiller won both games of a double header against the Brewers. The Tigers came from behind to win 8–7 and 7–5.
- June 5: Mark Fidrych pitched his second straight 11-inning complete game, beating Bert Blyleven and the Texas Rangers, 3–2. Ben Oglivie scored the winning run in the top of the 11th, and The Bird pitched a 1–2–3 inning in the bottom of the 11th against the heart of the Rangers lineup (Mike Hargrove, Toby Harrah, and Jeff Burroughs).
- June 8: The Tigers sold 29-year-old pitcher Joe Coleman to the Chicago Cubs for $100,000 and a player to be named at the end of the season. Coleman won 62 games for the Tigers from 1971 to 1973. In the first two months of the 1976 season, he compiled a 2–5 record and 4.86 ERA.
- June 8: The Tigers selected pitcher Pat Underwood with the second overall pick in the 1976 Major League Baseball draft. The Tigers also selected shortstop Alan Trammell in the second round, pitchers Dan Petry in the fourth round and Jack Morris in the fifth round, and shortstop Ozzie Smith in the seventh round. Three of the Tigers selections (Trammell, Morris, and Smith) ended up in the Baseball Hall of Fame.
- June 11: "Bird"-mania began to take hold in Detroit. A crowd of 36,377 showed up in Detroit for a Friday night game, as Mark Fidrych faced Nolan Ryan. Fidrych gave up only one earned run, and the Tigers came out on top, 4–3. The Tigers won on a walk-off single by Alex Johnson in the bottom of the ninth inning, with Ron LeFlore scoring the winning run.
- June 15: The Tigers lost to the Royals, 21–7. Four Detroit pitchers (Dave Lemanczyk, Bill Laxton, Ray Bare, and Steve Grilli) combined to allow 24 hits and 20 earned runs. George Brett went 4-for-5 and Amos Otis drove in five runs.
- June 16: The Tigers drew 21,659 on a Wednesday night to watch Mark Fidrych win his fifth game. Fidrych held the Royals to five hits and two earned runs. The Tigers trailed 3–2 going into the bottom of the ninth inning, but the Tigers rallied for two runs off singles by Dan Meyer and Alex Johnson, and a walk by Aurelio Rodríguez. Mickey Stanley ended it with a walk-off single to right field, driving in Johnson.
- June 20: The Tigers beat the Twins, 7–3, in Minneapolis, as Mark Fidrych extended his record to 6–1. Jason Thompson hit a three-run home run in the 3rd inning for the Tigers.
- June 24: Mark Fidrych drew 26,293 fans to Fenway Park for a Thursday night game, as the Tigers won, 6–3. Jason Thompson homered and Fidrych pitched another complete game.
- June 28: Mark Fidrych was in the spotlight, as the Tigers faced the Yankees on Monday Night Baseball. In front of a crowd of 47,855 at Tiger Stadium and a national television audience, "The Bird" talked to the ball and groomed the mound, as the Tigers won, 5–1 in a game that lasted only 1 hour and 51 minutes.

==== July ====
- July 3: As the country prepared to celebrate the Bicentennial, Mark Fidrych shut out the Orioles 4–0 in front of a sell out crowd of 51,032 at Tiger Stadium. Fidrych gave up only four hits and extended his record to 9–1.
- July 9: Pitching in front of another sell-out crowd (51,041) at Tiger Stadium, Mark Fidrych held the Royals to one run in nine innings, but Dennis Leonard shut out the Tigers. The final score was Royals – 1; Tigers – 0.
- July 13: Three Tigers (Mark Fidrych, Ron LeFlore, and Rusty Staub) started for the American League in the 1976 Major League Baseball All-Star Game. Fidrych gave up two runs and was the losing pitcher, as the National League defeated the American League, 7–1.
- July 16: Mark Fidrych won his 10th game, a 1–0 victory over the A's. Another big crowd (45,905) showed up to watch "The Bird" do his thing on the mound at Tiger Stadium.
- July 20: A crowd of over 30,000 shows up on a Tuesday night in Minneapolis to watch "The Bird." Fidrych pitched another complete game and got his 11th win, 8–3. Rusty Staub and Ron LeFlore homered for the Tigers.
- July 24: "The Bird" drew another big crowd to Tiger Stadium (37,405), but lasted only 4.1 innings. John Hiller got the win in relief, as Ben Oglivie hit a home run in the eighth inning to give the Tigers a 5–4 win over the Indians.
- July 29: Mark Fidrych took a loss despite pitching a six-hit complete game and not allowing an earned run. The Orioles shut out the Tigers, 1–0, as Lee May scored an unearned run in the fourth inning on an error by Detroit second baseman Pedro García. Rusty Staub tripled in the bottom of the fourth, but did not score as Willie Horton and Alex Johnson followed with ground balls to third base.

==== August ====
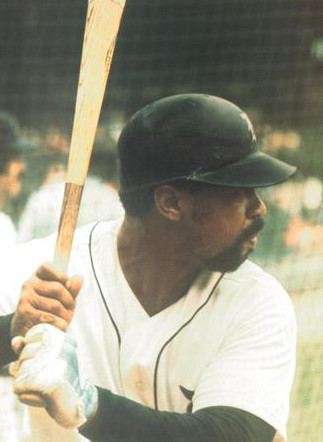
Willie Horton

- August 7: The Tigers defeated the Cleveland Indians, 6–1, before a crowd of 35,393 at Tiger Stadium. Mark Fidrych pitched a complete game and gave up only six hits, all singles. Ben Oglivie went 3-for-4 with two RBIs. Dan Meyer and Ron LeFlore scored two runs each. Fidrych improved his record to 12–4 with a 1.91 ERA.
- August 11: The Tigers beat the Rangers, 4–3, as Mark Fidrych notched his 13th win over Gaylord Perry. The Tigers drew 36,523 for a Wednesday game in Detroit. Rusty Staub and Willie Horton both hit home runs for Detroit.
- August 17: Despite a losing record, Mark Fidrych and the Tigers drew a season-high 51,822 fans to Tiger Stadium on a Tuesday night. It was the largest crowd at Tiger Stadium since July 17, 1973, and the largest for a night game since 1970. The Tigers won, 3–2, as catcher Bruce Kimm hit his first career home run in the bottom of the eighth inning. Fidrych gave up only five hits and pitched his 16th complete game of the season. After the game, the crowd remained, chanting "We Want Bird" until Fidrych returned to the field "thrusting his fist into the air again and again." His record improved to 14–4 with a 1.97 ERA.
- August 18: The Tigers lost, 5–4, to the California Angels in 11 innings. Nolan Ryan struck out 17 Detroit batters.
- August 25: The Tigers beat the White Sox, 3–1, in front of 40,000 fans on a Wednesday night in Detroit. Rookie Mark Fidrych held the White Sox to five hits in a game that lasted only one hour and 48 minutes.
- August 31: The Tigers lost to the California Angels, 6–3, at Anaheim. Nolan Ryan struck out 11 Detroit batters. Ron LeFlore for the 2000th strikeout of his career. Ron LeFlore struck out twice, including Ryan's 2,000th career strikeout.

==== September ====
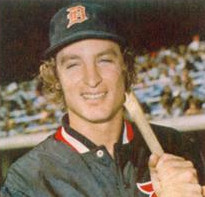
Jason Thompson

- September 3: The Tigers lost to the Brewers, 11–2, as Mark Fidrych had the worst outing of his young career, and Mike Hegan hit for the cycle for Milwaukee. Fidrych gave up nine runs (seven earned) in 3.2 innings.
- September 12: The Tigers beat Dock Ellis, 3–0, in front of 52,707 fans at Yankee Stadium. Mark Fidrych pitched a complete-game shutout for his 16th win.
- September 21 - Mark Fidrych won his 17th game, pitching a complete game and limiting the Indians to three runs. The victory halted a six-game losing streak.
- September 22: The Tigers lost to the Indians, 3–0, before a crowd of 3,616 at Tiger Stadium. It was the smallest crowd of the season at Tiger Stadium.
- September 22 - Mark Fidrych had his hair cut while sitting in Ralph Houk's chair at Tiger Stadium. The trimmed hair was placed in small, white boxes to be auctioned for charity.
- September 24: Tigers starter Dave Roberts shut out the Yankees, 3–0. Roberts held the Yankees to five hits, as John Wockenfuss had a triple and Rusty Staub hit a home run.
- September 25 - The Yankees clinched the American League East title by defeating the Tigers, 10–6, in Detroit. After the game, Yankees owner George Steinbrenner threw a party for his team at a downtown Detroit restaurant.
- September 28 - Mark Fidrych won his 18th game of the season. He shut out the Indians and allowed only five singles. The game, played on a cold night in Cleveland, attracted only 3,394 fans—the smallest crowd to watch Fidrych pitch. The game lasted only one hour and 48 minutes. In one of his final games as a Tiger, Willie Horton had a double, a home run, and two RBIs.
- September 28 - Quelling concerns that the Tigers would move out of the city, Tigers owner John Fetzer announced plans to renovate Tiger Stadium at cost of $15-$20 million. The proposed renovation included a new mercury vapor lighting system and new seats.
- September 29 - The Tigers defeated the Indians, 3–2, in Cleveland. Despite the loss, the Tigers clinched fifth place, ensuring that they would not finish in last place for a third consecutive year.
- September 30 - In his fourth start, rookie pitcher Ed Glynn got his first major league win. The Indians defeated the Tigers, 6–4, in Cleveland.

==== October ====
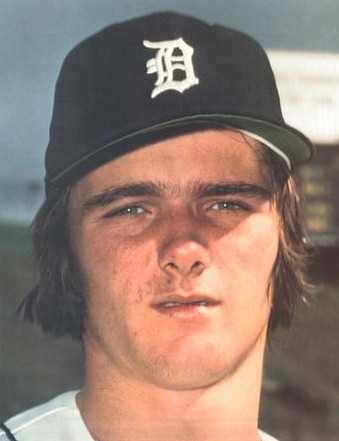
Shortstop Tom Veryzer

- October 1: John Hiller got a rare start when starter Vern Ruhle developed a sore shoulder. Hiller had not started a game since 1972. He pitched a complete game, four-hit shutout over the Brewers at County Stadium. The Tigers won by a 5–0 score.
- October 2: In his last start of the 1976 season, Fidrych got his 19th win, beating the Brewers, 4–1. Fidrych held the Brewers to five hits in a game that lasted 1 hour and 46 minutes.
- October 2: The Tigers signed Mark Fidrych to a three-year contract. The contract gave Fidrych a retroactive increase for his 1976 salary from $19,000 to an estimated $30,000. Fidrych's father negotiated the contract without using an agent. Fidrych said: "An agent probably could have gotten me more money. But then maybe I wouldn't have been happy. This way I got what I wanted.I'm happy."
- October 3: The Tigers defeated the Brewers, 5–2, in Milwaukee, closing their season with a four-game winning streak. For the year, the team improved to 74 victories, 17 more than in 1975, the largest improvement by any team in the American League. The game was Hank Aaron's last major league game. In his final major league at bat, in the bottom of the sixth inning, Aaron hit an infield single off Dave Roberts, driving in a run with his 2,297th RBI.

==== Award season ====
- October 30: Mark Fidrych was named as the winner of the "Tiger of the Year" award. In voting by the Detroit chapter of the Baseball Writers' Association of America, Fidrych received 31 of the 35 votes cast. The other four votes went to Ron LeFlore.
- November 10: The American League Cy Young Award was presented to Jim Palmer who received 108 points in the voting by the Baseball Writers' Association of America. Mark Fidrych finished second in the voting with 51 points.
- November 19: After compiling a league-best .978 fielding percentage at third base, Aurelio Rodriguez received the American League Gold Glove Award at third base. Rodríguez was the first American League third baseman other than Brooks Robinson to win the award since 1959.

=== Season standings ===
AL East
Team	W	L	Pct.	GB	Home	Road
New York Yankees	97	62	.610	—	45‍–‍35	52‍–‍27
Baltimore Orioles	88	74	.543	10½	42‍–‍39	46‍–‍35
Boston Red Sox	83	79	.512	15½	46‍–‍35	37‍–‍44
Cleveland Indians	81	78	.509	16	44‍–‍35	37‍–‍43
Detroit Tigers	74	87	.460	24	36‍–‍44	38‍–‍43
Milwaukee Brewers	66	95	.410	32	36‍–‍45	30‍–‍50

=== Record vs. opponents ===
1976 American League record Sources:
Team	BAL	BOS	CAL	CWS	CLE	DET	KC	MIL	MIN	NYY	OAK	TEX
Baltimore	—	7–11	8–4	8–4	7–11	12–6	6–6	11–7	4–8	13–5	4–8	8–4
Boston	11–7	—	7–5	6–6	9–9	14–4	3–9	12–6	7–5	7–11	4–8	3–9
California	4–8	5–7	—	11–7	7–5	6–6	8–10	4–8	8–10	5–7	6–12	12–6
Chicago	4–8	6–6	7–11	—	3–9	6–6	8–10	7–5	7–11	1–11	8–9	7–11
Cleveland	11–7	9–9	5–7	9–3	—	6–12	6–6	11–6	9–3	4–12	4–8	7–5
Detroit	6–12	4–14	6–6	6–6	12–6	—	4–8	12–6	4–8	9–8	6–6	5–7
Kansas City	6–6	9–3	10–8	10–8	6–6	8–4	—	8–4	10–8	7–5	9–9	7–11
Milwaukee	7–11	6–12	8–4	5–7	6–11	6–12	4–8	—	4–8	5–13	5–7	10–2
Minnesota	8–4	5–7	10–8	11–7	3–9	8–4	8–10	8–4	—	2–10	11–7	11–7
New York	5–13	11–7	7–5	11–1	12–4	8–9	5–7	13–5	10–2	—	6–6	9–3
Oakland	8–4	8–4	12–6	9–8	8–4	6–6	9–9	7–5	7–11	6–6	—	7–11
Texas	4–8	9–3	6–12	11–7	5–7	7–5	11–7	2–10	7–11	3–9	11–7	—

=== Roster ===
1976 Detroit Tigers
Roster
Pitchers: 21 Ray Bare; 15 Joe Coleman; 28 Jim Crawford; 20 Mark Fidrych; 48 Ed Glynn; 49 Steve Grilli; 18 John Hiller; 27 Bill Laxton; 19 Dave Lemanczyk; 29 Frank MacCormack; 17 Dave Roberts; 31 Vern Ruhle	Catchers: 11 Bill Freehan; 46 Bruce Kimm; 12 Milt May; 45 John Wockenfuss; Infielders: 3 Pedro García; 2 Phil Mankowski; 1 Jerry Manuel; 4 Aurelio Rodríguez; 9 Chuck Scrivener; 3 Gary Sutherland; 30 Jason Thompson; 7 Tom Veryzer; 5 Mark Wagner	Outfielders: 33 Alex Johnson; 34 Marvin Lane; 8 Ron LeFlore; 25 Dan Meyer; 22 Ben Oglivie; 24 Mickey Stanley; 10 Rusty Staub; Designated hitters: 23 Willie Horton	Manager: 35 Ralph Houk; Coaches: 52 Fred Gladding; 50 Jim Hegan; 51 Joe Schultz; 53 Dick Tracewski

== Player stats ==
= Indicates team leader

= Indicates league leader

=== Batting ===
==== Starters by position ====
Note: Pos = Position; G = Games played; AB = At bats; H = Hits; Avg. = Batting average; HR = Home runs; RBI = Runs batted in; SB = Stolen bases

Pos	Player	G	AB	H	Avg.	HR	RBI	SB
C	Bill Freehan	71	237	64	.270	5	27	0
1B	Jason Thompson	123	412	90	.218	17	54	2
2B	Pedro García	77	227	45	.198	3	20	2
3B	Aurelio Rodríguez	128	480	67	.240	8	50	0
SS	Tom Veryzer	97	354	83	.234	1	25	1
LF	Alex Johnson	125	429	115	.268	6	45	14
CF	Ron LeFlore	135	544	172	.316	4	39	58
RF	Rusty Staub	161*	589	176	.299	15	96	3
DH	Willie Horton	114	401	105	.262	14	56	0

- Tied with John Mayberry (Kansas City) and Robin Yount (Milwaukee) for league lead

==== Other batters ====
Note: G = Games played; AB = At bats; H = Hits; Avg. = Batting average; HR = Home runs; RBI = Runs batted in

Player	G	AB	H	Avg.	HR	RBI
Ben Oglivie	115	305	87	.285	15	47
Dan Meyer	105	294	74	.252	2	16
Chuck Scrivener	80	222	49	.221	2	16
Mickey Stanley	84	214	55	.257	4	29
Bruce Kimm	63	152	40	.263	1	6
John Wockenfuss	60	144	32	.222	3	10
Gary Sutherland	42	117	24	.205	0	6
Mark Wagner	39	115	30	.261	0	12
Phil Mankowski	24	85	23	.271	1	4
Marvin Lane	18	48	9	.188	0	5
Jerry Manuel	54	43	6	.140	0	2
Milt May	6	25	7	.280	0	1

=== Pitching ===
= Indicates league leader

==== Starting pitchers ====
Note: G = Games pitched; IP = Innings pitched; W = Wins; L = Losses; ERA = Earned run average; SO = Strikeouts; CG = Complete Games

Player	G	IP	W	L	ERA	SO	CG
Dave Roberts	36	252.0	16	17	4.00	79	18
Mark Fidrych	31	250.1	19	9	2.34	97	24
Vern Ruhle	32	199.2	9	12	3.92	88	5
Ray Bare	30	134.0	7	8	4.63	59	3
Joe Coleman	12	66.2	2	5	4.86	38	1
Frank MacCormack	9	32.2	0	5	5.79	14	0
Ed Glynn	5	23.2	1	3	6.08	17	0

==== Other pitchers ====
Note: G = Games pitched; IP = Innings pitched; W = Wins; L = Losses; ERA = Earned run average; SO = Strikeouts

Player	G	IP	W	L	ERA	SO
Jim Crawford	32	109.1	1	8	4.53	68
Dave Lemanczyk	20	81.1	4	6	5.09	51

==== Relief pitchers ====
Note: G = Games pitched; W = Wins; L = Losses; SV = Saves; ERA = Earned run average; SO = Strikeouts

Player	G	W	L	SV	ERA	SO
John Hiller	56	12	8	13	2.38	117
Steve Grilli	36	3	1	3	4.64	36
Bill Laxton	26	0	5	2	4.09	74

== Awards and honors ==
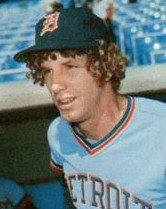
Pitcher Mark Fidrych

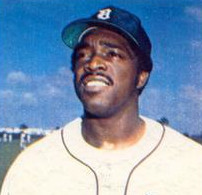
Center fielder Ron LeFlore

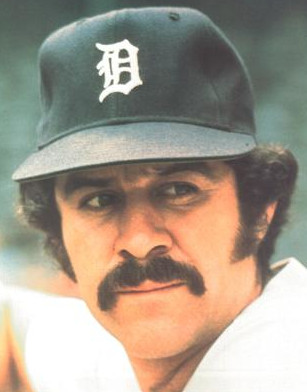
Third baseman Aurelio Rodríguez

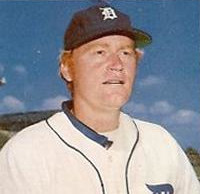
Right fielder Rusty Staub

- Mark Fidrych, AL Rookie of the Year Award
- Mark Fidrych, Finished 2nd in AL Cy Young Award voting
- Mark Fidrych, Finished 11th in AL MVP Award voting
- Aurelio Rodríguez, AL Gold Glove Award at third base

=== League top ten finishers ===
Mark Fidrych

- MLB leader in ERA (2.34)
- MLB leader in Adjusted ERA+ (158)
- AL leader in complete games (24)
- #3 in AL in walks plus hits per innings pitched (WHIP) (1.079)
- #4 in AL in wins (19)
- #4 in AL in win percentage (.679)
- #5 in AL in bases on balls per 9 inning pitched (1.91)
- #5 in AL in shutouts (4)

John Hiller

- #4 in AL in games finished (46)

Ron LeFlore

- AL leader in errors by an outfielder (11)
- #2 in AL in stolen bases (58)
- #3 in MLB in times caught stealing (20)
- #4 in AL in singles (137)
- #5 in AL in batting average (.316)
- #5 in AL in runs scored (93)
- #6 in AL in strikeouts (111)

Dave Roberts

- #2 in MLB in losses (17)
- #2 in MLB in earned runs allowed (112)
- #5 in AL in shutouts (4)
- #9 in AL in complete games (18)

Aurelio Rodríguez

- AL leader in fielding percentage by a third baseman (.978)
- #3 in AL in times grounded into double plays (19)

Rusty Staub

- AL leader in games played (161)
- AL leader in times grounded into double plays (23)
- #2 in AL in times on base (266)
- #2 in AL in sacrifice flies (11)
- #3 in AL in plate appearances (690)
- #4 in AL in on-base percentage (.386)
- #4 in AL in bases on balls (83)
- #4 in AL in runs created (99)
- #5 in AL in RBIs (96)
- #5 in AL in intentional walks (11)
- #7 in AL in times hit by pitch (7)
- #7 in AL in hits (7)
- #8 in AL in OPS (.818)
- #10 in AL in total bases (255)

=== Players ranking among top 100 all time at position ===
The following members of the 1977 Detroit Tigers were ranked among the Top 100 of all time at their position by The Bill James Historical Baseball Abstract in 2001:

- Aurelio Rodríguez: 91st best third baseman of all time
- Ron LeFlore: 80th best center fielder of all time
- Ben Oglivie: 64th best left fielder of all time
- Willie Horton: 55th best left fielder of all time

== Farm system ==
Level	Team	League	Manager
AAA	Evansville Triplets	American Association	Fred Hatfield
AA	Montgomery Rebels	Southern League	Les Moss
A	Lakeland Tigers	Florida State League	Jim Leyland
Rookie	Bristol Tigers	Appalachian League	Joe Lewis

LEAGUE CHAMPIONS: Montgomery, Lakeland
