= Norway High School (Iowa) =

High school in Iowa, United States

Coordinates: 41.903°N 91.927°W

Norway High School was a high school located in the town of Norway, Iowa. It was closed after the 1990–1991 school year, and the majority of students were merged into Benton Community High School. The school's final baseball season was the subject of the movie The Final Season.

== Baseball program ==
The storied Norway High School baseball team amassed twenty Iowa state titles, with the first coming in 1965, and the last in their final season in 1991. Norway competed in the 1A class, the class for the smallest of school districts, of Iowa high school athletics. Their final season was coached by Kent Stock, who took over for a retiring Jim Van Scoyoc, who had previously won three state coach of the year awards, and one national coach of the year award.

Iowa Spring Baseball State Tournament Championships held from 1928-1972
Year	Winner, score	Loser, score	Site
1967	Norway, 4	Mason City, 2	Mason City
1968	Norway, 18	Decorah, 6	Mason City

Iowa Fall Baseball State Tournament Championships. held from 1939-1985
Year	Winner, score	Loser, score	Site
1965	Norway, 2	Spalding Catholic (Granville), 0	Boone
1966	Norway, 4	Goldfield, 1	Boone
1967	Norway, 4	Visitation Catholic (Stacyville), 0	Boone
1968	Norway, 3	St. John Catholic (Bancroft), 0	Boone
1970	Norway, 5	OLGC Catholic (Fonda), 1	Norway
1972	Norway, 1	St. John Catholic (Bancroft), 0	Boone
1974	Spalding Catholic (Granville), 3	Norway, 2	Boone
1979	Norway, 9	Prescott, 0	Boone
1982*	Norway, 13	Palmer, 1	Boone
1983	Norway, 8	St. Mary's Catholic (Remsen), 6	Boone
*5 inning game

Iowa Summer Baseball State Tournament Championships. held from 1946-present All championships won at 1A level
Year	Winner, score	Loser, score
1983*	Norway, 11	Treynor, 0
1984	Norway, 4	Paullina, 1
1987	Norway, 9	St. John Catholic (Bancroft), 6
1990	Norway, 4	North Tama (Traer), 3
1991**	Norway, 7	South Clay (Gillett Grove), 4
*5 inning game **8 inning game

== Notable alumni ==
- Mike Boddicker - Former MLB player
- Bruce Kimm - Former MLB player, coach, and manager
- Hal Trosky - Former MLB player
