= Shellsburg, Iowa =

- City
- Downtown Shellsburg

- Location of Shellsburg, Iowa
- Coordinates: 42°5′35″N 91°52′13″W
- Country: United States
- State: Iowa
- County: Benton

Area
  - Total: 0.79 sq mi (2.05 km^{2})
  - Land: 0.79 sq mi (2.05 km^{2})
  - Water: 0 sq mi (0.00 km^{2})
- Elevation: 791 ft (241 m)

Population (2020)
  - Total: 961
  - Density: 1,216.6/sq mi (469.73/km^{2})
- Time zone: UTC-6 (Central (CST))
  - Summer (DST): UTC-5 (CDT)
- ZIP code: 52332
- Area code: 319
- FIPS code: 19-72480
- GNIS feature ID: 0461565
- Website: www.shellsburg.com

Shellsburg is a city in Benton County, Iowa, United States. The population was 961 at the time of the 2020 census. It is part of the Cedar Rapids Metropolitan Statistical Area.

== History ==
Shellsburg was founded in 1854.

== Geography ==
According to the United States Census Bureau, the city has a total area of 0.77 square miles (1.99 km^{2}), all land.

== Demographics ==
Historical populations
Year	Pop.	±%
1880	547	—
1890	468	−14.4%
1900	511	+9.2%
1910	527	+3.1%
1920	590	+12.0%
1930	546	−7.5%
1940	552	+1.1%
1950	632	+14.5%
1960	625	−1.1%
1970	740	+18.4%
1980	771	+4.2%
1990	765	−0.8%
2000	938	+22.6%
2010	983	+4.8%
2020	961	−2.2%
Source:"U.S. Census website". United States Census Bureau. and Iowa Data Center; Source: U.S. Decennial Census

=== 2020 census ===
As of the census of 2020, there were 961 people, 385 households, and 267 families residing in the city. The population density was 1,216.6 inhabitants per square mile (469.7/km^{2}). There were 414 housing units at an average density of 524.1 per square mile (202.4/km^{2}). The racial makeup of the city was 90.9% White, 0.7% Black or African American, 0.0% Native American, 0.5% Asian, 0.0% Pacific Islander, 0.8% from other races and 7.0% from two or more races. Hispanic or Latino persons of any race comprised 1.9% of the population.

Of the 385 households, 30.4% of which had children under the age of 18 living with them, 53.0% were married couples living together, 9.9% were cohabitating couples, 20.5% had a female householder with no spouse or partner present and 16.6% had a male householder with no spouse or partner present. 30.6% of all households were non-families. 24.2% of all households were made up of individuals, 10.1% had someone living alone who was 65 years old or older.

The median age in the city was 43.2 years. 25.0% of the residents were under the age of 20; 3.6% were between the ages of 20 and 24; 23.7% were from 25 and 44; 30.8% were from 45 and 64; and 16.9% were 65 years of age or older. The gender makeup of the city was 49.0% male and 51.0% female.

=== 2010 census ===
At the 2010 census there were 983 people, 428 households, and 276 families living in the city. The population density was 1,276.6 inhabitants per square mile (492.9/km^{2}). There were 455 housing units at an average density of 590.9 per square mile (228.1/km^{2}). The racial makup of the city was 96.7% White, 0.7% African American, 1.0% Native American, 0.1% Asian, 0.1% Pacific Islander, and 1.3% from two or more races. Hispanic or Latino of any race were 0.5%.

Of the 428 households 27.8% had children under the age of 18 living with them, 51.9% were married couples living together, 8.9% had a female householder with no husband present, 3.7% had a male householder with no wife present, and 35.5% were non-families. 30.1% of households were one person and 15.4% were one person aged 65 or older. The average household size was 2.24 and the average family size was 2.74.

The median age was 44.6 years. 20.9% of residents were under the age of 18; 6.2% were between the ages of 18 and 24; 23.5% were from 25 to 44; 30.1% were from 45 to 64; and 19.3% were 65 or older. The gender makeup of the city was 48.5% male and 51.5% female.

=== 2000 census ===
At the 2000 census there were 938 people, 356 households, and 260 families living in the city. The population density was 1,302.8 inhabitants per square mile (503.0/km^{2}). There were 370 housing units at an average density of 513.9 per square mile (198.4/km^{2}). The racial makup of the city was 99.04% White, 0.32% Native American, 0.32% Asian, and 0.32% from two or more races. Hispanic or Latino of any race were 0.43%.

Of the 356 households 36.5% had children under the age of 18 living with them, 63.5% were married couples living together, 5.6% had a female householder with no husband present, and 26.7% were non-families. 21.9% of households were one person and 8.4% were one person aged 65 or older. The average household size was 2.57 and the average family size was 3.00.

The age distribution was 27.5% under the age of 18, 5.0% from 18 to 24, 33.6% from 25 to 44, 20.8% from 45 to 64, and 13.1% 65 or older. The median age was 36 years. For every 100 females, there were 106.6 males. For every 100 females age 18 and over, there were 97.1 males.

The median household income was $41,912 and the median family income was $49,219. Males had a median income of $36,176 versus $24,250 for females. The per capita income for the city was $17,352. About 8.1% of families and 8.3% of the population were below the poverty line, including 11.6% of those under age 18 and 11.4% of those age 65 or over.

== Education ==
The Vinton-Shellsburg Community School District operates public schools. The district was established on July 1, 1993, by the merger of the Vinton Community School District and the Shellsburg Community School District.

== Media ==
In June 2006, Shellsburg became one of several locations used to film the movie The Final Season, a story that follows the success of a small town school baseball team before consolidating with a neighboring school district. Portions of downtown Shellsburg were used to portray the nearby town of Norway, in which the movie is based.
