= The Final Season =

2007 film by David M. Evans

- Theatrical release poster
- Directed by: David Mickey Evans
- Written by: Art D'Alessandro
- Produced by: Steven Schott; Tony C. Wilson; Herschel Weingrod
- Starring: Sean Astin; Powers Boothe; Tom Arnold; Rachael Leigh Cook; Michael Angarano
- Cinematography: Dan Stoloff
- Edited by: Harry Kerimidas
- Music by: Nathan Wang
- Distributed by: Yari Film Group; Freestyle Releasing
- Release date: October 12, 2007
- Running time: 114 minutes
- Country: United States
- Language: English
- Box office: $1.1 million

The Final Season is a 2007 baseball film starring Sean Astin, Rachael Leigh Cook, Tom Arnold, Powers Boothe, Larry Miller, Brett Claywell, Michael Angarano, and Marshall Bell and directed by David Mickey Evans. The film wrapped production in 2006 in Shellsburg, Iowa, and Cedar Rapids, Iowa, and was released in the United States and Canada on October 12, 2007, by Yari Film Group.

The film premiered three times at the Tribeca Film Festival in New York City. The film also premiered in Cedar Rapids on October 7, 2007.

== Plot ==
Based on the true story of Kent Stock, who, in 1991, takes on what he perceives as the job of a lifetime as head coach of the Norway High School Tigers baseball team, which has won 19 state titles and has a baseball tradition in Iowa tantamount to that of the New York Yankees nationally.

Stock joins the team in 1990 as assistant coach, excited to learn from the legendary Tigers coach Jim Van Scoyoc. The Tigers win the 1990 title, the twelfth under Van Scoyoc. Stock is unaware that he has been picked by the school's Principal Halberstorm to replace Van Scoyoc in order to facilitate a losing 1991 season. The principal is pushing a consolidation of Norway with the larger "Madison School District" (in real life, the Benton Community School District), but the town is opposed, centered mainly on not wanting to give up the successful baseball program. The principal only knows about Stock's experience as a girls' volleyball coach, unaware that Stock was a star player for his Division III college baseball team and is a student of the game.

Several of the Tigers' returning stars refuse to go out for Coach Stock, who must win over the rest and convince them, the skeptical townspeople and himself that he can fill their former coach's shoes, all while dealing with the reality that this will be the team's final season due to the impending merger. With the support of a young female state auditor whose findings helped push through the merger, and a gadfly baseball writer from Des Moines who is following the team, Kent learns to motivate the team his own way.

In May 1991, Norway High's baseball tradition ends on a triumphant but somber note as it wins its 20th state championship in its final season. A video clip of the actual Coach Stock thanking Van Scoyoc publicly for the opportunity opens the final scene.

== Cast ==
- Sean Astin as Kent Stock, Norway coach in team's final season
- Rachael Leigh Cook as Polly Hudson, budget analyst hired to provide support for the consolidation plan
- Michael Angarano as Mitch Akers, troubled transfer student and new player
- Powers Boothe as legendary Norway coach Jim Van Scoyoc
- Tom Arnold as Burt Akers, father of Mitch and former Norway player
- Brett Claywell as Patrick Iverson, all-state player
- Marshall Bell as Harvey Makepeace, school board supervisor
- Danielle Savre as Cindy Iverson
- James Gammon as Jared (Grandpa) Akers
- Jesse Henecke as Principal Halberstorm
- Larry Miller as Roger Dempsey
- Roscoe Myrick as Sammy Wilson, player
- Chris Olsen as Eddie Fitz, player
- Angela Paton as Ann (Grandma) Akers
- Nick Livingston as Kevin Stewart, player
- Dayton Callie as Mr Stewart, bus driver & school janitor
- Kim Grimaldi as Mrs. Stewart
- Ryan Flood as Baseball Player #4
- Nick Schmitt as Baseball player #5 Norway team
- Nathan Pyan as Baseball Player #10 Norway team
- Josh Merino as Reed Ellis, star opposing team pitcher in final game
- Chris Jay Becker as Extra (Uncredited)
- Ryan Birkicht as Baseball Player #34 Norway Team Tommy Driscoll (Uncredited)
- Don Winchester as Barbershop Customer (Uncredited)

== Reception ==
The film grossed $1,159,691 in the USA.

On Rotten Tomatoes, the film has an approval rating of 26% based on 50 reviews, with an average rating of 4.4/10. The critics consensus reads, "The Final Season recycles clichés we've seen in countless other sports movies, making for an unoriginal and uninspiring addition to the genre." On Metacritic, the film had an average score of 43 out of 100, based on 16 reviews, which indicates "mixed or average reviews".

John Anderson of Variety wrote: "There's not quite as much corn in The Final Season as there is in the Iowa farm fields that run through it, but it's close."

Heather Boerner of Common Sense Media rated it 3 out of 5 and called it a "Heartwarming-but-trite drama for baseball fans."

== Production notes ==
- Amy Acker and Eliza Dushku were at one point cast in the role of Polly, but both dropped out because of scheduling conflicts.
- Cameraman Roland Schlotzhauer was killed during a helicopter crash while filming a scene in the movie. His Bell 206 helicopter hit a powerline and crashed in a field, killing him and injuring the pilot and a producer.
- Scenes depicting the town of Norway were shot in downtown Shellsburg, Iowa

== See also ==
- List of baseball films
