= Bruce Kimm =

American baseball player and coach (born 1951)

- Catcher / Manager / Coach
- Born: June 29, 1951 (age 75); Cedar Rapids, Iowa, U.S.
- Batted: Right Threw: Right

MLB debut
- May 4, 1976, for the Detroit Tigers

Last MLB appearance
- September 19, 1980, for the Chicago White Sox

MLB statistics
- Batting average: .237
- Home runs: 1
- Runs batted in: 26
- Managerial record: 33–45
- Winning %: .423
- Stats at Baseball Reference

Teams
- As player: Detroit Tigers (1976–1977); Chicago Cubs (1979); Chicago White Sox (1980); As manager: Chicago Cubs (2002); As coach: Cincinnati Reds (1984–1988); Pittsburgh Pirates (1989–1990); San Diego Padres (1991–1992); Florida Marlins (1997–1998); Colorado Rockies (1999); Chicago White Sox (2003)

Career highlights and awards
- World Series champion (1997)

Bruce Edward Kimm (born June 29, 1951) is an American former professional baseball catcher, manager and coach. He played all or part of four seasons in Major League Baseball (MLB) for the Detroit Tigers, Chicago Cubs and Chicago White Sox between 1976 until 1980.

Born in Cedar Rapids, Iowa, Kimm grew up in nearby Norway, Iowa and was a star player on the celebrated Norway High School baseball teams, all of which played in state championships during his high school days. He was a three-time all-state player in baseball and selected in the seventh round of the 1969 amateur draft by the White Sox, signing in his senior year of high school. Kimm made his major league debut in 1976 with the Detroit Tigers on May 4, where he was Mark Fidrych's personal catcher in 1976 and 1977. They had been teammates in 1975 at Triple-A Evansville and won the Junior World Series. He played his final major league game on September 19, 1980.

== Managerial career ==
Kimm began his managerial career in the Tigers organization in 1982. In 1995, he won Manager of the Year honors in the AA Southern League, compiling a 76–67 record with the Orlando Cubs en route to a playoff appearance. Kimm has also managed within the Cincinnati Reds organization. He managed in the minor leagues for five and a half seasons from 1982 to 2002, compiling a 405–382 (.515) record.

After the 2002 Chicago Cubs started the season with a 34–49 (.410) record, manager Don Baylor was fired and replaced on an interim basis by Kimm (though bench coach Rene Lachemann managed one game on July 5 prior to Kimm's arrival), who had been managing the Cubs' AAA affiliate. This caused some controversy, as former Tampa Bay Devil Rays manager and then Cubs pitching coach Larry Rothschild was seen by some as a better choice. Kimm did not fare much better than Baylor, as the Cubs went 33–45 (.423) for the rest of the season. His departure was announced before the final game of the season; he was replaced by Dusty Baker. In 2003, Kimm was a third base coach for Chicago's other MLB team, the White Sox.

Kimm has also been a coach for the Cincinnati Reds, Pittsburgh Pirates, San Diego Padres, Florida Marlins, Chicago White Sox, and Colorado Rockies.

== Managerial record ==
Team	Year	Regular season					Postseason			
Team	Year	Games	Won	Lost	Win %	Finish	Won	Lost	Win %	Result
CHC	2002	78	33	45	.423	5th in NL Central				
Total		78	33	45	.423					

Preceded by Jackie Moore	Colorado Rockies Bench Coach; 1999	Succeeded by Toby Harrah
