= Norway, Iowa =

- City
- Location of Norway, Iowa
- Coordinates: 41°54′12″N 91°55′24″W
- Country: United States
- State: Iowa
- County: Benton
- Founded: 1863

Area
  - Total: 0.43 sq mi (1.12 km^{2})
  - Land: 0.43 sq mi (1.12 km^{2})
  - Water: 0 sq mi (0.00 km^{2})
- Elevation: 810 ft (247 m)

Population (2020)
  - Total: 466
  - Density: 1,073.4/sq mi (414.44/km^{2})
- Time zone: UTC-6 (Central (CST))
  - Summer (DST): UTC-5 (CDT)
- ZIP code: 52318
- Area code: 319
- FIPS code: 19-57720
- GNIS feature ID: 0459660
- Website: www.norwayiowa.com

Norway is a city in Benton County, Iowa, United States. The population was 466 at the time of the 2020 census. The city is approximately 17 miles (27 km) southwest of downtown Cedar Rapids. It is part of the Cedar Rapids Metropolitan Statistical Area. Norway is the setting of the movie The Final Season.

== History ==
Norway was platted in 1863. To establish the settlement, Osman Tuttle gave five acres of land to Chicago and Northwestern Railway on the condition that it would be named after his native country.

== Geography ==
According to the United States Census Bureau, the city has a total area of 0.45 square miles (1.17 km^{2}), all land.

== Demographics ==
Historical populations
Year	Pop.	±%
1890	401	—
1900	533	+32.9%
1910	479	−10.1%
1920	463	−3.3%
1930	448	−3.2%
1940	407	−9.2%
1950	441	+8.4%
1960	516	+17.0%
1970	554	+7.4%
1980	633	+14.3%
1990	583	−7.9%
2000	601	+3.1%
2010	545	−9.3%
2020	466	−14.5%
Source:"U.S. Census website". United States Census Bureau. and Iowa Data Center; Source: U.S. Decennial Census

=== 2020 census ===
As of the census of 2020, there were 466 people, 229 households, and 127 families residing in the city. The population density was 1,073.4 inhabitants per square mile (414.4/km^{2}). There were 249 housing units at an average density of 573.5 per square mile (221.4/km^{2}). The racial makeup of the city was 94.0% White, 0.4% Black or African American, 0.0% Native American, 0.6% Asian, 0.0% Pacific Islander, 0.2% from other races and 4.7% from two or more races. Hispanic or Latino persons of any race comprised 1.3% of the population.

Of the 229 households, 21.0% of which had children under the age of 18 living with them, 40.2% were married couples living together, 8.7% were cohabitating couples, 19.7% had a female householder with no spouse or partner present and 31.4% had a male householder with no spouse or partner present. 44.5% of all households were non-families. 38.9% of all households were made up of individuals, 18.8% had someone living alone who was 65 years old or older.

The median age in the city was 48.1 years. 18.5% of the residents were under the age of 20; 6.0% were between the ages of 20 and 24; 22.7% were from 25 and 44; 30.3% were from 45 and 64; and 22.5% were 65 years of age or older. The gender makeup of the city was 55.8% male and 44.2% female.

=== 2010 census ===
As of the census of 2010, there were 545 people, 243 households, and 146 families living in the city. The population density was 1,211.1 inhabitants per square mile (467.6/km^{2}). There were 256 housing units at an average density of 568.9 per square mile (219.7/km^{2}). The racial makeup of the city was 98.0% White, 0.6% African American, 0.4% Native American, 0.2% Asian, 0.2% from other races, and 0.7% from two or more races. Hispanic or Latino of any race were 0.4% of the population.

There were 243 households, of which 26.3% had children under the age of 18 living with them, 45.7% were married couples living together, 8.6% had a female householder with no husband present, 5.8% had a male householder with no wife present, and 39.9% were non-families. 36.2% of all households were made up of individuals, and 11.9% had someone living alone who was 65 years of age or older. The average household size was 2.24 and the average family size was 2.92.

The median age in the city was 41.2 years. 23.1% of residents were under the age of 18; 5% were between the ages of 18 and 24; 25.6% were from 25 to 44; 26.8% were from 45 to 64; and 19.6% were 65 years of age or older. The gender makeup of the city was 49.9% male and 50.1% female.

=== 2000 census ===
As of the census of 2000, there were 601 people, 241 households, and 173 families living in the city. The population density was 1,320.9 inhabitants per square mile (510.0/km^{2}). There were 247 housing units at an average density of 542.9 per square mile (209.6/km^{2}). The racial makeup of the city was 99.00% White, 0.50% African American, 0.50% from other races. Hispanic or Latino of any race were 0.17% of the population.

There were 241 households, out of which 32.8% had children under the age of 18 living with them, 60.2% were married couples living together, 9.5% had a female householder with no husband present, and 28.2% were non-families. 25.7% of all households were made up of individuals, and 8.3% had someone living alone who was 65 years of age or older. The average household size was 2.49 and the average family size was 3.01.

26.1% are under the age of 18, 6.8% from 18 to 24, 29.1% from 25 to 44, 24.1% from 45 to 64, and 13.8% who were 65 years of age or older. The median age was 37 years. For every 100 females, there were 93.2 males. For every 100 females age 18 and over, there were 93.9 males.

The median income for a household in the city was $44,018, and the median income for a family was $50,278. Males had a median income of $36,103 versus $20,917 for females. The per capita income for the city was $20,300. About 4.3% of families and 5.1% of the population were below the poverty line, including 9.6% of those under age 18 and 5.3% of those age 65 or over.

== Education ==
Students from Norway attend the Benton Community School District.

Prior to 1991, students attended Norway High School, notable for its baseball athletic program (the subject of the feature film The Final Season). The Norway school district merged into the Benton district on July 1, 1995.

== Infrastructure ==
The Union Pacific Railroad runs on the edge of town.

== Notable people ==
- Mike Boddicker - Former MLB player
- Bruce Kimm - Former MLB player, coach, and manager
- Hal Trosky - Former MLB player
