= Dan Gonzales =

American baseball player (born 1953)

- Right fielder
- Born: September 30, 1953 (age 73); Whittier, California, U.S.
- Batted: Left Threw: Right

MLB debut
- April 7, 1979, for the Detroit Tigers

Last MLB appearance
- May 30, 1980, for the Detroit Tigers

MLB statistics
- Batting average: .200
- Home runs: 0
- Runs batted in: 2

NPB statistics
- Batting average: .174
- Home runs: 1
- Runs batted in: 3
- Stats at Baseball Reference

Teams
- Detroit Tigers (1979–1980); Hanshin Tigers (1981)

Daniel David Gonzales (born September 30, 1953) is an American former Major League Baseball right fielder who played for the Detroit Tigers in 1979 and 1980.
