= Bob Adams (first baseman) =

American baseball player (born 1952)

- First baseman
- Born: January 6, 1952 (age 74); Pittsburgh, Pennsylvania, U.S.
- Batted: Right Threw: Right

MLB debut
- July 10, 1977, for the Detroit Tigers

Last MLB appearance
- September 29, 1977, for the Detroit Tigers

MLB statistics
- Batting average: .250
- Home runs: 2
- Runs batted in: 2
- Stats at Baseball Reference

Teams
- Detroit Tigers (1977)

Robert Melvin Adams (born January 6, 1952) is an American former professional baseball first baseman and catcher. He played 15 games in Major League Baseball for the Detroit Tigers in 1977, mostly as a pinch hitter. Of the three games he played in the field, two were at first base and one was at catcher. In just 24 major league at bats, Adams hit two home runs, both solo. Prior to the 1977 season his manager, Ralph Houk, said that he "played no position well" but "might be of help".
