= Bruce Robbins (baseball) =

American baseball player (born 1959)

- Pitcher
- Born: September 10, 1959 (age 66); Portland, Indiana, U.S.
- Batted: Left Threw: Left

MLB debut
- July 28, 1979, for the Detroit Tigers

Last MLB appearance
- September 23, 1980, for the Detroit Tigers

MLB statistics
- Win–loss record: 7–5
- Earned run average: 5.34
- Strikeouts: 45
- Stats at Baseball Reference

Teams
- Detroit Tigers (1979–80)

Bruce Duane Robbins (born September 10, 1959) is an American former Major League Baseball pitcher for the Detroit Tigers from 1979 to 1980. Robbins, a left-handed batter, also threw left-handed.

== Early life ==
Robbins attended Blackford High School in Hartford City, Indiana. The Tigers drafted him out of high school in the 14th round of the 1977 amateur draft.
