= Hal Trosky =

American baseball player (1912–1979)

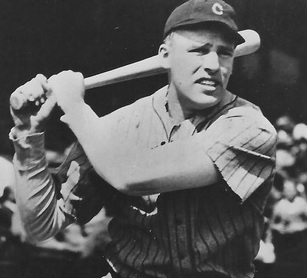
- Trosky, circa 1933–41
- First baseman
- Born: November 11, 1912; Norway, Iowa, U.S.
- Died: June 18, 1979 (aged 66); Cedar Rapids, Iowa, U.S.
- Batted: Left Threw: Right

MLB debut
- September 11, 1933, for the Cleveland Indians

Last MLB appearance
- September 27, 1946, for the Chicago White Sox

MLB statistics
- Batting average: .302
- Home runs: 228
- Runs batted in: 1,012
- Stats at Baseball Reference

Teams
- Cleveland Indians (1933–1941); Chicago White Sox (1944, 1946)

Career highlights and awards
- AL RBI leader (1936); Cleveland Guardians Hall of Fame

Harold Arthur Trosky Sr. (born Harold Arthur Trojovsky; November 11, 1912 – June 18, 1979) was an American professional baseball player. He played in Major League Baseball as a first baseman for the Cleveland Indians (1933–1941) and the Chicago White Sox (1944, 1946). Trosky, who had a career batting average of .302, led the American League in runs batted in in 1936 as a member of the Cleveland Indians. He was inducted into the Cleveland Indians Hall of Fame in 1951.

== Baseball career ==
Trosky was born in Norway, Iowa. He batted left-handed and threw right-handed.

Trosky had a career .302 batting average, with a high of .343 in 1936. He hit 228 career home runs and had 1,012 RBIs. He had 1,561 career hits. His 216 HRs with the Indians ranks him fifth on the team's all-time list, behind Earl Averill, Manny Ramirez, Albert Belle, and Jim Thome. In his rookie season, 1934, he finished second in the AL in RBIs (142) and third in hits (206) and home runs (35). His 374 total bases set a rookie record that has since been tied by Tony Oliva in 1964. Trosky's best numbers came in his third full year in the major leagues, 1936, when he led the American League in RBIs and total bases. His 162 RBIs also set a team record that stood for 63 years, while his 405 total bases that year remain a franchise best. He also had a career-high 42 home runs, .343 batting average, 216 hits, and a .644 slugging percentage. Despite being hailed as the next Babe Ruth, he is widely considered one of the best players to never make an All-Star team. The reason for this omission was the ill-fortune of being an American League first baseman at the same time as Hall of Fame first basemen Lou Gehrig, Jimmie Foxx and Hank Greenberg.

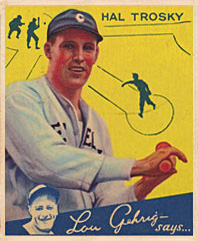
A 1934 Goudey baseball card of Trosky

Starting in 1938, Trosky started experiencing near constant migraine headaches, which began to affect his vision. After nearly being hit by a pitch, he announced on July 12, 1941, to Indians manager Roger Peckinpaugh and reporters, "a fellow can't go on like this forever. If I can't find some relief, I'll simply have to give up and spend the rest of my days on my farm in Iowa." Trosky told a sportswriter in February 1942 that he had visited doctors in several American cities for help with his headaches but found none. He revealed that he had told the Indians that he would be retiring but may seek to return to baseball if his condition improved after a year of rest (as it would turn out, the migraine pain would eventually be lessened with daily vitamin B-1 shots and a lessened intake of dairy products).

After being deemed unsuitable for service in World War II due to his migraines, Trosky returned to baseball with the Chicago White Sox in 1944, playing with the team for that year before taking 1945 off and returning to play for one final year in 1946. Trosky retired in 1946 at age 33, although he dabbled in semiprofessional baseball as a manager in 1947 along with serving as a scout for the White Sox until 1950 before he left each position to focus more time on his farm. He eventually took up real agricultural real-estate sales along with serving as a lecturer from time to time with the Iowa High School Baseball Coaches Association.

His son, Hal Trosky Jr., pitched briefly (three innings) with the White Sox in 1958. He died in Cedar Rapids Iowa in 1979 age 66.

=== Career statistics ===
| G | AB | R | H | 2B | 3B | HR | RBI | TB | BB | SO | AVG | OBP | SLG | FLD |
| 1347 | 5161 | 835 | 1561 | 331 | 58 | 228 | 1012 | 2692 | 545 | 440 | .302 | .371 | .522 | .991 |

Source:Hal Trosky Career Statistics at Baseball Reference

== Highlights ==
- Led the American League in RBIs (162), extra-base hits (96), and total bases (405) in 1936
- Top 10 in the AL in slugging percentage and home runs six times each in his career
- Hit 3 home runs in a game twice: 5/30/1934 vs. Chicago White Sox and 7/5/1937 vs. St. Louis Browns

== See also ==
- List of Major League Baseball career home run leaders
- List of Major League Baseball career runs batted in leaders
- List of Major League Baseball annual runs batted in leaders
