= Frank MacCormack =

American baseball player (born 1954)

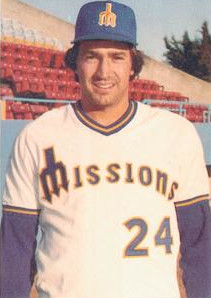
- Pitcher
- Born: September 21, 1954 (age 71); Jersey City, New Jersey, U.S.
- Batted: Right Threw: Right

MLB debut
- June 14, 1976, for the Detroit Tigers

Last MLB appearance
- May 3, 1977, for the Seattle Mariners

MLB statistics
- Win–loss record: 0–5
- Earned run average: 5.45
- Strikeouts: 18
- Stats at Baseball Reference

Teams
- Detroit Tigers (1976); Seattle Mariners (1977)

Frank Louis MacCormack (born September 21, 1954) is an American former Major League Baseball (MLB) pitcher for the Detroit Tigers (1976) and Seattle Mariners (1977).

MacCormack was raised in Secaucus, New Jersey, and played baseball at Weehawken High School, graduating in 1971. He then attended Rutgers University but was rejected as a walk-on for the Scarlet Knights baseball team. He signed with the Tigers in 1973 while pitching for a semi-pro team.

MacCormack reached the majors in June 1976, with an 0–5 record and 5.79 earned run average for the Tigers in eight starts and one relief appearance. He threw a 96 mile per hour fastball in his debut. The Mariners selected him in the 1976 MLB expansion draft.

MacCormack began Seattle's inaugural season in the starting rotation but was sent down to the minors to work on his command. He would never return to the majors, with Seattle releasing him in March 1979. Ineffective and wild, MacCormack has one of the highest rates of wild pitches and walks per nine innings pitched of any MLB pitcher.
