= Ed Glynn =

American baseball player (born 1953)

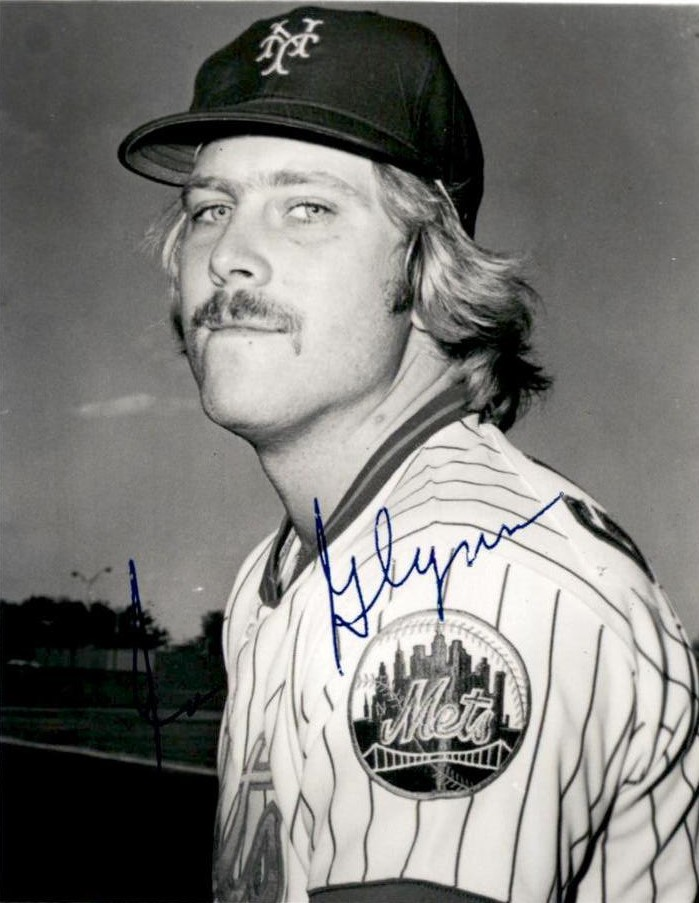
- Pitcher
- Born: June 3, 1953 (age 73); New York, New York, U.S.
- Batted: Right Threw: Left

MLB debut
- September 19, 1975, for the Detroit Tigers

Last MLB appearance
- May 18, 1985, for the Montreal Expos

MLB statistics
- Win–loss record: 12–17
- Earned run average: 4.25
- Strikeouts: 184
- Stats at Baseball Reference

Teams
- Detroit Tigers (1975–1978); New York Mets (1979–1980); Cleveland Indians (1981–1983); Montreal Expos (1985)

Edward Paul Glynn (born June 3, 1953) is an American former professional baseball player. He was a left-handed pitcher who worked in 175 Major League games, all but eight in relief, over ten seasons (1975–1983; 1985) for the Detroit Tigers, New York Mets, Cleveland Indians and Montreal Expos. Glynn stood 6 feet 2 inches (1.88 m) tall and weighed 180 pounds (82 kg). He is one of the few players in the history of the Mets who grew up in the neighborhood where the team has played since 1964, Flushing, Queens. When Glynn was a student at Francis Lewis High School, he sold hot dogs at Shea Stadium during Mets' games in the late 1960s and early 1970s. As a result, when he later played for the Mets at Shea, the team honored him in a pre-game ceremony in which he was presented with an official Shea Stadium hot dog.

Glynn, however, was bypassed by his hometown team when he graduated from high school in 1971, signing as an undrafted free agent with the Detroit Tigers on September 25, 1971. He worked his way up through the Tiger farm system for four seasons, until he won 11 games in a 1975 season split between the Montgomery Rebels and the Evansville Triplets. On September 19, 1975, he made his Major League debut in relief against the eventual American League champion Boston Red Sox. Entering the game in the fourth inning of a 4–4 tie, he struck out the year's AL Most Valuable Player and Rookie of the Year, Fred Lynn, to snuff out a Boston rally, but one inning later gave up the winning runs on a two-run single by Rico Petrocelli, as Boston won 7–5. Nine days later, Glynn made his first MLB start, lasting six innings against the Milwaukee Brewers and allowing three earned runs. He took the loss, however, as the Tigers were shut out by Larry Anderson.

Glynn spent 1976–1978 bouncing between Detroit and the Tigers' Triple-A Evansville affiliate, and was acquired by the Mets during spring training of 1979. Starting the year with the Triple-A Tidewater Tides, Glynn was effective in 17 relief appearances and was recalled by the Mets to make his National League debut on June 1, 1979. He earned a save in his maiden NL appearance, working a scoreless 11th inning against the Atlanta Braves and preserving a 5–4 victory for Skip Lockwood. He worked in 46 games, all in relief, that season, and collected a career-high seven saves. Then, he spent the full 1980 season with the Mets — his only full season in the Majors. Traded to the Indians just prior to the opening of the 1981 season, he spent much of that year in Triple-A but returned to Cleveland in May 1982 to work in a career-high 47 games and earn five victories in seven decisions. He then began 1984 with the Indians, but was ineffective and returned to the minor leagues. His final Major League appearances came in relief in May 1985 for the Expos. He retired for the 1988–1989 seasons before attempting a brief comeback with the Tidewater Tides in 1990. All told he pitched in 17 pro seasons.

As a big leaguer, Glynn allowed 261 hits and 151 bases on balls in 264 2/3 innings pitched. He struck out 184 and earned 12 total saves. His career ERA was 4.25 and career WHIP was 1.557.
