= Fernando Arroyo =

American baseball player (born 1952)

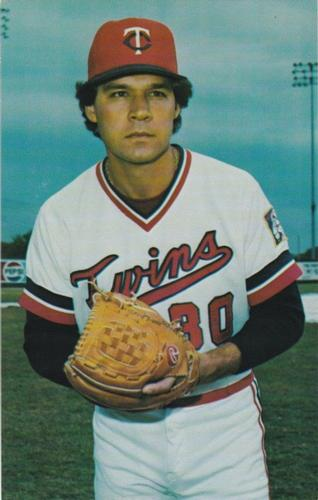
- Pitcher
- Born: March 21, 1952 (age 73); Sacramento, California, U.S.
- Batted: Right Threw: Right

MLB debut
- June 28, 1975, for the Detroit Tigers

Last MLB appearance
- August 11, 1986, for the Oakland Athletics

MLB statistics
- Win–loss record: 24–37
- Earned run average: 4.44
- Strikeouts: 172
- Stats at Baseball Reference

Teams
- Detroit Tigers (1975, 1977–1979); Minnesota Twins (1980–1982); Oakland Athletics (1982, 1986)

Fernando Arroyo (born March 21, 1952) is an American former professional baseball pitcher for the Detroit Tigers, Minnesota Twins, and Oakland Athletics of Major League Baseball (MLB). In eight MLB seasons, he had a 24–37 record over 121 games (60 started), with 12 complete games, two shutouts, 28 games finished, 535 2/3 innings pitched, 589 hits allowed, 288 runs allowed, 264 earned runs allowed, 56 home runs allowed, 160 walks allowed, 172 strikeouts, 11 hit batsmen, 15 wild pitches, 2,289 batters faced, 13 intentional walks, four balks and a 4.44 ERA.

On March 13, 2010, Arroyo was inducted into the Mexican American Hall of Fame in a ceremony held at the Jose Rizal Community Center in Sacramento, California.
