= Bruce Taylor (baseball) =

American baseball player (born 1953)

- Pitcher
- Born: April 16, 1953 (age 73); Holden, Massachusetts, U.S.
- Batted: Right Threw: Right

MLB debut
- August 5, 1977, for the Detroit Tigers

Last MLB appearance
- May 22, 1979, for the Detroit Tigers

MLB statistics
- Win–loss record: 2–2
- Earned run average: 3.86
- Strikeouts: 27
- Stats at Baseball Reference

Teams
- Detroit Tigers (1977–1979)

Bruce Bell Taylor (born April 16, 1953) is an American former professional baseball player. The right-handed pitcher appeared in 30 games, all in relief, for the Detroit Tigers of Major League Baseball between 1977 and 1979. He was listed at 6 feet (1.8 m) tall and 178 pounds (81 kg).

Taylor was signed as an undrafted free agent by the Cincinnati Reds in 1972 and spent three years (1973–1975) in the Cincinnati farm system, pitching exclusively in relief after the 1973 campaign. After enjoying outstanding back-to-back seasons with the Double-A Trois-Rivieres Aigles in 1974 and the Triple-A Indianapolis Indians in 1975, he was selected by Detroit in the 1975 Rule 5 Draft. He was recalled by the Tigers from the Triple-A Evansville Triplets in August 1977 and appeared in 19 games as a rookie, winning his only decision and collecting two saves. However, he spent most of 1978 with Evansville (appearing in only one Major League game), and then worked in ten more MLB contests before returning to Evansville and finishing his professional career in 1979.

He allowed only 39 hits in his 49 Major League innings pitched, with 17 bases on balls and 27 strikeouts. His two saves and one victory in 1977 were the only ones that Taylor registered in the Majors.
