= Phil Mankowski =

American baseball player (born 1953)

- Third baseman
- Born: January 9, 1953 (age 73); Buffalo, New York, U.S.
- Batted: Left Threw: Right

MLB debut
- August 30, 1976, for the Detroit Tigers

Last MLB appearance
- July 21, 1982, for the New York Mets

MLB statistics
- Batting average: .264
- Home runs: 8
- Runs batted in: 64
- Stats at Baseball Reference

Teams
- Detroit Tigers (1976–1979); New York Mets (1980, 1982)

Philip Anthony Mankowski (born January 9, 1953) is an American former professional baseball third baseman. He played all or parts of six seasons in Major League Baseball with the Detroit Tigers (1976–1979) and New York Mets (1980, 1982).

== Early years ==
Mankowski was born in Buffalo, New York, in 1953. His father Ben played in the Brooklyn Dodgers farm system in the early 1940s, and his brother Paul played in the Minnesota Twins' farm system from 1965 to 1969. Mankowski played four years of varsity baseball at Bishop Turner High School in Buffalo and was drafted in 1970 at age 17 in the ninth round by the Detroit Tigers.

== Major League Baseball ==
With Aurelio Rodriguez holding the third baseman position for Detroit, Mankowski spent six years in the minor leagues before making his major league debut. As a rookie in 1976, Mankowski appeared in 24 games, 22 of them as the Tigers' starting third baseman. In 1977, he appeared in a career-high 94 games, including 78 as the starter at second base. During the 1977 season, he also had career highs in at bats (286), hits (79), triples (three), and RBIs (27). The only other season in which Mankowski had at least 100 at bats was 1978, when he hit .275, scored 28 runs, hit four home runs, and drove in 20 runs. On April 7, 1978, Mankowski hit a three-run home run to help Mark Fidrych get the win in a five-hitter against the Toronto Blue Jays.

On October 31, 1979, the Tigers traded Mankowski and Jerry Morales to the New York Mets for Richie Hebner. He appeared in 21 games for the Mets during the 1980 and 1982 seasons.

In 269 major league games, Mankowski hit .264 with 195 hits, 72 runs scored, 64 RBIs, 55 bases on balls, 23 doubles, eight home runs, four triples, and three stolen bases.

== Later years ==
Mankowski played third baseman Hank Benz in the 1984 movie The Natural.

While playing for the Mets in 1982, Mankowski began studying classical piano.
