= Mark Fidrych =

American baseball player (1954–2009)

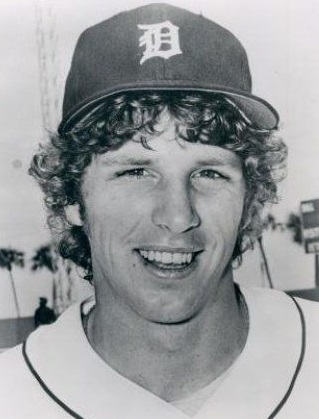
- Pitcher
- Born: August 14, 1954; Worcester, Massachusetts, U.S.
- Died: April 13, 2009 (aged 54); Northborough, Massachusetts, U.S.
- Batted: Right Threw: Right

MLB debut
- April 20, 1976, for the Detroit Tigers

Last MLB appearance
- October 1, 1980, for the Detroit Tigers

MLB statistics
- Win–loss record: 29–19
- Earned run average: 3.10
- Strikeouts: 170
- Stats at Baseball Reference

Teams
- Detroit Tigers (1976–1980)

Career highlights and awards
- 2× All-Star (1976, 1977); AL Rookie of the Year (1976); AL ERA leader (1976)

Mark Steven Fidrych (/ˈfɪdrɪtʃ/ FID-rich; August 14, 1954 – April 13, 2009), nicknamed "the Bird", was an American professional baseball pitcher who played five seasons in Major League Baseball (MLB) with the Detroit Tigers.

Known for his quirky antics on the mound, Fidrych led the major leagues with a 2.34 ERA in 1976, won the American League (AL) Rookie of the Year award, and finished with a 19–9 record. Shortly thereafter, however, injuries derailed his career, which ended after just five seasons in the major leagues.

== Early life ==
Fidrych was born on August 14, 1954, in Worcester, Massachusetts. The son of an assistant school principal, Fidrych played baseball at Algonquin Regional High School in Northborough, Massachusetts, and at Worcester Academy, a day and boarding school in central Massachusetts. In the 1974 amateur draft he was selected in the 10th round by the Detroit Tigers. He later joked that when he received a phone call informing him that he had been drafted, he thought he was drafted into the armed services, not thinking there were any Major League teams considering him. In the minor leagues one of his coaches with the Lakeland Tigers dubbed the lanky 6-foot-3 right-handed pitcher "The Bird" because of his resemblance to the "Big Bird" character on the popular Sesame Street television program.

== 1976 season ==
Fidrych joined the Tigers spring training camp in 1976 and made the roster, though he did not make his Major League debut until April 20, pitching only one inning through mid-May.

In his third appearance, on May 15, Fidrych made his first major league start, caught by Bruce Kimm, his batterymate in 1975 at Triple A Evansville. He held the Cleveland Indians hitless through six innings and ended up with a two-hit, 2–1 complete game victory, with one walk and five strikeouts. In addition to his pitching, Fidrych attracted attention in his debut for talking to the ball while on the pitcher's mound, strutting in a circle around the mound after every out, patting down the mound, and refusing to allow groundskeepers to fix the mound in the sixth inning. After the game, sports writer Jim Hawkins wrote in the Detroit Free Press: "He really is something to behold." Rico Carty of the Indians said he thought Fidrych "was trying to hypnotize them."

On May 25 at Fenway Park in Boston, Fidrych started his second game in front of two busloads of fans who traveled from Fidrych's hometown of Northborough. Fidrych pitched well, allowing two earned runs (a two-run home run by Carl Yastrzemski) in eight innings, but Luis Tiant shut out the Tigers, and Fidrych received his first major league loss.

On May 31, Fidrych pitched an 11-inning, complete-game victory over the Milwaukee Brewers. On June 5, he pitched another 11-inning, complete-game victory over the Texas Rangers in Arlington. Fidrych continued to pitch well heading into the All-Star break:

- June 11: Fidrych pitched a complete game 4–3 victory over the California Angels before a crowd of 36,377 on a Friday night at Tiger Stadium.
- June 19: Fidrych pitched a complete game 4–3 victory over the Kansas City Royals before a crowd of 21,659 on a Wednesday night at Tiger Stadium.
- June 24: Fidrych returned to Fenway Park with his family and friends in the stands. He gave up back-to-back home runs to Fred Lynn and Yastrzemski but won his sixth consecutive start.
- June 28: Fidrych pitched before 47,855 at Tiger Stadium and a national television audience in the millions, as the Tigers hosted the New York Yankees on ABC's Monday Night Baseball with Bob Prince, Warner Wolf, and Bob Uecker in the broadcast booth. Fidrych earned a 5–1 complete-game victory which took only an hour and 51 minutes. Fans would not leave the stadium until The Bird emerged from the dugout for a curtain call. After the broadcast, which was filled with plenty of "Bird" antics, Fidrych became a national celebrity.
- July 3: Fidrych pitched before a sell-out crowd of 51,650 on a Saturday night at Tiger Stadium. He shut out the Baltimore Orioles, 4–0, improved to 9–1 in ten starts, and reduced his earned run average (ERA) to 1.85.
- July 9: Pitching in front of a sell-out crowd of 51,041 at Tiger Stadium, Fidrych held the Royals to one run in nine innings, but Dennis Leonard shut out the Tigers 1–0. Despite the loss, Detroit fans refused to leave the stadium until The Bird made a curtain call.

Fidrych was named to the 1976 AL All-Star team, just the second Tiger player aged 21 or younger to be named an All-Star, following Al Kaline in 1955. The game was played on July 13, 1976 at Veterans Stadium in Philadelphia. Fidrych was named the starter, at the time becoming just the second rookie to start an All-Star game following Dave Stenhouse in 1962. He gave up two earned runs in the first inning, none in the second, and took the loss.

Just three days later, on July 16, Fidrych won his tenth game, a 1–0 victory over the A's. Four days later in Minnesota, before Fidrych's thirteenth start, the Twins released thirteen homing pigeons on the mound before the game. According to Fidrych, "they tried to do that to blow my concentration." Fidrych pitched another complete game, an 8–3 win, and improved his record to 11–2. On Saturday, July 24, Fidrych surrendered four earned runs on nine hits and lasted only 4 1/3 innings; John Hiller got the win for the Tigers in long relief on the Game of the Week.

After the game, Fidrych was interviewed on live television, and a small controversy arose when Fidrych said "bullshit" on the air. Fidrych recalled: "He (NBC commentator Tony Kubek) said, it looked like you were gonna cry. I just said, No, I wasn't about to cry. I was just bullshit.... And then I said, excuse me. I said, I didn't mean to swear on the air but I just showed you my feelings." The next day, Fidrych received a telegram informing him he had been fined $250 by baseball commissioner Bowie Kuhn; however, it was a prank sent by his own teammates.

On July 29 and August 7, Fidrych threw consecutive six-hit complete games. He won one of the games and lost the other. The Tigers edged the Rangers, 4–3, on August 11 as Fidrych notched his 13th win over Gaylord Perry. Six days later, the Tigers drew a season-high 51,822 fans as Fidrych went to 14–4, beating opposing pitcher Frank Tanana 3–2. On August 25, the Tigers downed the White Sox, 3–1, in front of 40,000 fans on a Wednesday night in Detroit. Fidrych held the White Sox to five hits in a game which lasted only 108 minutes. Between August 29 and September 17, Fidrych lost three consecutive decisions, bringing his record to 16–9.

Fidrych beat the Indians two starts in a row, on September 21 and 28. In his last start of the 1976 season, Fidrych picked up his 19th win, defeating the Brewers, 4–1, giving up five hits. A month later, Fidrych was announced as the runner-up for the Cy Young Award, with Jim Palmer taking the award.

Fidrych won the AL Rookie of the Year Award and was named Tiger of the Year by the Detroit baseball writers. He led all of MLB in ERA (2.34) and Adjusted ERA+ (158), while leading the AL in complete games (24). He finished in the top five in several other statistical categories, including wins, win percentage, shutouts, walks plus hits per innings pitched (WHIP), and bases on balls per nine innings pitched. He received the 11th-highest vote total in the year's AL MVP voting.

In Fidrych's 18 home starts in 1976, he compiled a 12–6 record while the Tigers averaged 33,649 fans; the team drew an average of only 13,843 in his non-starts.

During the offseason between the 1976 and 1977 seasons, Fidrych published an autobiography with Tom Clark titled No Big Deal.

== Injuries and retirement ==
Fidrych tore the cartilage in his knee while fooling around and shagging fly balls in the outfield during spring training in 1977. Upon his return from the injury on May 27 of that year, he appeared to pick up right where he left off the previous season, compiling a 6–2 record and 1.83 ERA in his first 8 starts. Then, during a July 4 game against the Baltimore Orioles, he felt his arm, in his words, "go dead." It was a torn rotator cuff, but it would not be diagnosed until 1985. He was removed from the game after 5.2 innings, following a two-run home run by Eddie Murray. The Orioles scored six runs in the inning and won the game 6–4. Fidrych made two more starts before going on the disabled list for the remainder of 1977, finishing the season 6–4 with a 2.89 ERA. He was again invited to the All-Star Game, but he had to decline the invitation due to the injury. While on the disabled list toward the end of the season, Fidrych worked as a guest color analyst on a Monday Night Baseball telecast for ABC; he was subsequently criticized for his lack of preparation, as when play-by-play partner Al Michaels tried talking with him about Philadelphia Phillies player Richie Hebner and Fidrych responded, "Who's Richie Hebner?" As an AL player, Fidrych had never had to face Hebner, who played in the National League. They would later end up teammates on the Tigers in 1980.

He pitched only three games in 1978, winning two, including an opening day win. On August 12, 1980, 48,361 fans showed up at Tiger Stadium to see what turned out to be his last attempt at a comeback. Fidrych pitched his last MLB game on October 1, 1980, in Toronto, going five innings and giving up four earned runs, while picking up the win in an 11–7 Tigers victory which was televised in Detroit.

At the end of the 1981 season, Detroit gave Fidrych his outright release and he signed as a free agent with the Boston Red Sox, playing for one of their minor league teams. However, his torn rotator cuff, still not diagnosed and left untreated, never healed. At age 29, he was forced to retire. Fidrych went to famed sports medicine doctor James Andrews in 1985. Dr. Andrews discovered the torn rotator cuff and operated; still, the damage already done to the shoulder effectively ended Fidrych's chance of coming back to a professional baseball career.

Fidrych remained cheerful and upbeat. In a 1998 interview, when asked who he would invite to dinner if he could invite anyone in the world, Fidrych said, "My buddy and former Tigers teammate Mickey Stanley, because he's never been to my house."

Fidrych lived with his wife Ann, whom he married in 1986, on a 107-acre (0.43 km^{2}) farm in Northborough. They had a daughter, Jessica. Aside from fixing up his farmhouse, he worked as a contractor hauling gravel and asphalt in a ten-wheeler. On weekends, he helped out in his mother-in-law's business, Chet's Diner, on Route 20 in Northborough; the diner was later operated by his daughter. He would also frequent the local baseball field to help teach and play ball with the kids.

== Pitching style ==
Fidrych was not an overpowering pitcher, posting strikeout rates below the league average throughout his career. He was, however, praised for having exceptional control (compiling a walk rate of 1.77 per 9 IP over his first two seasons), and for having good late movement on his pitches while keeping the ball down and inducing many ground balls. He allowed only 23 home runs in 412 1/3 major league innings (0.5/9 rate).

== Personality ==
Fidrych captured the imagination of fans with his antics on the field. He would crouch down on the pitcher's mound and fix cleat marks, in what became known as "manicuring the mound," talk to himself, talk to the ball, aim the ball like a dart, strut around the mound after every out, and throw back balls that "had hits in them," insisting they be removed from the game. He would also walk around to shake hands with the infielders after they made great plays in the field. Because the Tiger coaches were somewhat superstitious about jinxing Fidrych's success, Bruce Kimm, a rookie catcher, caught each of Fidrych's outings.

As his success grew, Tiger Stadium crowds would chant "We want the Bird, we want the Bird" at the end of each of his home victories. The chants would continue until he emerged from the dugout to tip his cap to the crowd. While these "curtain calls" have become more common in modern sports, they were less so in mid-1970s baseball. In his 18 appearances at Tiger Stadium, attendance equaled almost half of the entire season's 81 home games. Teams started asking Detroit to change its pitching rotation so Fidrych could pitch in their ballparks, and he appeared on the cover of numerous magazines, including Sports Illustrated (twice, including once with Sesame Street character Big Bird), Rolling Stone (as of 2026, the only baseball player ever to appear on the cover of the rock and roll magazine), and The Sporting News. In one week, Fidrych turned away five people who wanted to be his agent, saying, "Only I know my real value and can negotiate it."

Fidrych also drew attention for the simple, bachelor lifestyle he led in spite of his fame, driving a green subcompact car, living in a small Detroit apartment, wondering aloud if he could afford to answer all of his fan mail on his league-minimum $16,500 salary, and telling people that if he hadn't been a pitcher, he'd have been happy pumping gas in Northborough.

At the end of his rookie season, the Tigers gave him a $25,000 bonus and signed him to a three-year contract worth $255,000. Economists estimated the extra attendance Fidrych generated around the league in 1976 was worth more than $1 million. Fidrych also did an Aqua Velva television commercial after the 1976 season. He was considered for the role of the jock Tom Chisum in Grease (1978), a role that ultimately went to Lorenzo Lamas.

== Death ==
According to the Worcester County district attorney's office, family friend Joseph Amorello found Fidrych dead beneath his ten-wheel dump truck at his Northborough home at around 2:30 p.m. on April 13, 2009. Fidrych appeared to have been working on the truck at the time of the accident. Amorello later said: "We were just, in general, getting started for the [road-building] season this week and it seems as though his truck was going to be needed. It looked like he was doing some maintenance on it. I found him under the truck. There's not much more I can say. I dialed 911 and that's all I could do." Authorities concluded that Fidrych had suffocated after his clothes had become entangled with a spinning power takeoff shaft on the truck. The Massachusetts medical examiner ruled the death an accident. Fidrych was cremated and a memorial service was held in his honor that was attended by thousands.

A 2012 wrongful-death suit filed by Fidrych's widow against the makers of the truck and the spinning component was dismissed by a Massachusetts appeals court in November 2017. In a unanimous decision, the court ruled that the companies provided warnings and that their equipment was free of design defects. The court decreed that the companies had no legal duty to provide any such warnings because Fidrych had modified the truck.

== Honors and tributes ==
Fidrych was inducted into the Shrine of the Eternals of the Baseball Reliquary in 2002.

In one of Bill James' baseball books, he quoted the Yankees' Graig Nettles as telling about an at-bat against Fidrych, who, as usual, was talking to the ball before pitching to Nettles. Immediately Graig jumped out of the batter's box and started talking to his bat. He reportedly said, "Never mind what he says to the ball. You just hit it over the outfield fence!" Nettles struck out. "Damn," he said. "Japanese bat. Doesn't understand a word of English." Nettles actually hit Fidrych very well in his career, though, with a .389 average [7-for-18] and two home runs.

On April 15, 2009, the Tigers paid tribute to Fidrych at Comerica Park with a moment of silence and a video before their game against the Chicago White Sox.

At the time of his death he was about to be inducted into the National Polish-American Sports Hall of Fame. He was inducted posthumously on June 18, 2009.

On June 19, 2009, Jessica Fidrych honored her father at Comerica Park by throwing out the ceremonial first pitch to manager Jim Leyland for the Tigers game against the Milwaukee Brewers. Prior to throwing out the first pitch, Jessica "manicured the mound" just like her father. Ann Fidrych, widow of Mark Fidrych, was also present on the field for the ceremony. On July 26, 2026 Fidrych’s grandson, David, threw out the first pitch at Comerica Park in honor of his grandfather. He did all of his grandfather’s on the mound rituals, including “manicuring the mound”, pointing the ball & even taking long bounding strides off the mound after the pitch.

The Baseball Project, a band that specializes in songs about baseball, honored Fidrych in their song "1976".

The Varsity Baseball Field at Algonquin Regional High School is named in honor of Mark Fidrych.

== See also ==
- List of Major League Baseball annual ERA leaders
- 1976 Detroit Tigers season
