= Jason Thompson (first baseman, born 1954) =

American baseball player (born 1954)

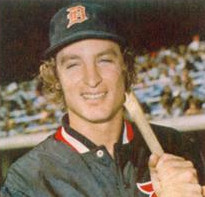
- First baseman
- Born: July 6, 1954 (age 71); Hollywood, California, U.S.
- Batted: Left Threw: Left

MLB debut
- April 23, 1976, for the Detroit Tigers

Last MLB appearance
- April 24, 1986, for the Montreal Expos

MLB statistics
- Batting average: .261
- Home runs: 208
- Runs batted in: 782
- Stats at Baseball Reference

Teams
- Detroit Tigers (1976–1980); California Angels (1980); Pittsburgh Pirates (1981–1985); Montreal Expos (1986)

Career highlights and awards
- 3× All-Star (1977, 1978, 1982)

Jason Dolph Thompson (born July 6, 1954) is an American former professional baseball first baseman. He played in Major League Baseball for the Detroit Tigers, California Angels, Pittsburgh Pirates, and Montreal Expos from 1976 to 1986. He was a three-time MLB All-Star.

== Detroit Tigers ==
Thompson was drafted by the Los Angeles Dodgers in the fifteenth round of the 1972 Major League Baseball draft, but chose instead to play ball at Cal-State Northridge. He was then selected in the fourth round of the 1975 Major League Baseball draft by the Detroit Tigers.

In his first professional season, 1975, he batted .324 with 10 home runs and 38 runs batted in for the Southern League's Montgomery Rebels. With regular first baseman Dan Meyer batting .192 with only two RBIs, the Tigers gave the job to Thompson early into the 1976 season. He responded by going four-for-five in his third game as a major leaguer.

Despite batting just .218, Thompson led the Tigers with 17 home runs and was third on the club with 54 RBIs. He also earned a reputation as one of the top fielding first basemen in the American League. Following the season, he was named to the Topps Rookie All-Star team.

In 1977, Thompson was batting .276 with 12 home runs and 65 RBIs at the All-Star break to gain selection to the AL squad, but he did not appear in the game. He was named to the All-Star team again a year later, and flew out to George Foster in his only at-bat.

In 1979, in a nationally televised NBC game on June 16, Thompson hit two home runs in the game, a 4–2 loss. Thompson initially hit a foul ball over the roof in foul territory in right field completely out of Tiger Stadium off California Angels' right-hander Dave Frost who later gave up both home runs. Thompson also hit several other home runs over the right field roof of Tiger stadium during his time in Detroit. In four plus seasons with the Tigers, Thompson batted .256 with 98 home runs and 354 RBIs.

== California Angels ==
After getting off to a slow start in 1980, Thompson was traded from the Tigers to the Angels for Al Cowens on May 27. The Angels had a shortage of power hitters due to injuries to Don Baylor and Brian Downing at the time. Thompson assumed first base duties upon his acquisition by the Angels with Hall of Famer Rod Carew shifting to designated hitter, however, they traded positions by the end of the season. Thompson batted over .300 for the Angels, but was traded to the Pittsburgh Pirates during spring training the following season for Mickey Mahler and Ed Ott.

== Trade to the Yankees ==
Immediately after acquiring Thompson, the Pirates dealt him to the New York Yankees for Jim Spencer and minor league pitchers Greg Cochran and Fred Tolliver, however, commissioner Bowie Kuhn voided the deal. The Yankees were to pay Spencer's 1981 salary according to the original deal; which put the transaction over the $400,000 limit the commissioner had established for any transaction.

== Pittsburgh Pirates ==
Now part of a team he was never intended to be part of, Thompson got off to a slow start with the Pirates, batting .171 with seven home runs and seventeen RBIs in the first half of the strike shortened season. His hitting improved substantially in the second half of the 1981 season, as he batted .321 with eight home runs and 25 RBIs.

Thompson continued his hot hitting into 1982, hitting thirteen home runs and batting .354 through the month of May to earn the third All-Star nod of his career. For the season, Thompson batted .284 with 31 home runs and 101 RBIs. He became the third player in Pirates history to reach the 100-RBI, 100-walk plateau, finishing fifth in the National League in OPS with a .902 mark.

On June 26, 1984, Thompson hit four home runs in a doubleheader against the Chicago Cubs at Wrigley Field, tying Ralph Kiner's 37-year franchise record for most home runs in a doubleheader.

Thompson remained with the Pirates through 1985, batting .259 with 93 home runs and 354 RBIs in his five seasons with the club. During Spring training 1986, he was dealt to the Montreal Expos for two minor leaguers. He lost his starting job to rookie Andrés Galarraga shortly into the season, and was released on June 30. Thompson was unable to continue his career due to knee injuries.

== Career stats ==
Seasons	Games	PA	AB	Runs	Hits	2B	3B	HR	RBI	SB	BB	SO	Avg.	Slg.	OBP	Fld%
11	1418	5686	4802	640	1253	204	12	208	782	8	816	862	.261	.438	.366	.992

While with the Tigers, Thompson earned the nickname "Roof Top" from his ability to hit balls onto the Tiger Stadium right field roof. On two occasions he powered the ball over the roof and completely out of the stadium. A steady first baseman, he also led each league in total chances in 1977 and 1984.
