= John Wockenfuss =

American baseball player (1949–2022)

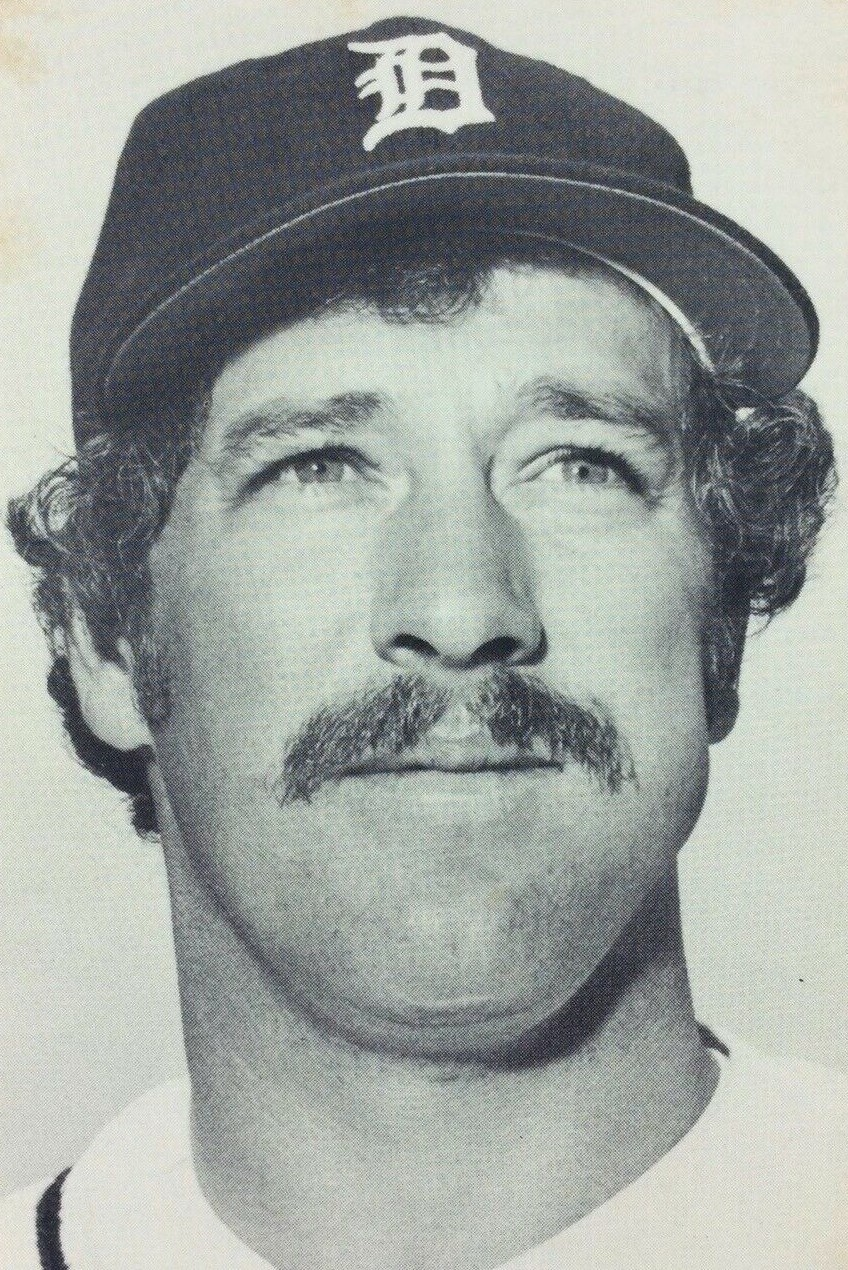
- Wockenfuss in 1981
- Utility player
- Born: February 27, 1949; Welch, West Virginia, U.S.
- Died: August 19, 2022 (aged 73); Wilmington, Delaware, U.S.
- Batted: Right Threw: Right

MLB debut
- August 11, 1974, for the Detroit Tigers

Last MLB appearance
- August 15, 1985, for the Philadelphia Phillies

MLB statistics
- Batting average: .262
- Home runs: 86
- Runs batted in: 310
- Stats at Baseball Reference

Teams
- Detroit Tigers (1974–1983); Philadelphia Phillies (1984–1985)

Johnny Bilton Wockenfuss (February 27, 1949 – August 19, 2022), sometimes known by the nicknames "Fuss" and "Johnny B.", was an American professional baseball player and minor league manager who played in Major League Baseball (MLB) for the Detroit Tigers and Philadelphia Phillies. He was known for his strong throwing arm, unorthodox batting stance, and ability to play at multiple positions.

Wockenfuss began his baseball career as a pitcher in high school. He was drafted by the Washington Senators in the 42nd round of the 1967 amateur draft. Wockenfuss spent seven seasons in the Senators / Texas Rangers' farm system, before being traded to the St. Louis Cardinals in June 1973, where he remained in the minor leagues. He was then acquired by the Detroit Tigers from the Cardinals in December 1973 and played ten seasons for the club from 1974 to 1983, first as a backup catcher and then as a utility player whose assignments included first baseman, designated hitter, outfielder, third baseman, and pinch hitter. Wockenfuss was traded to the Philadelphia Phillies in 1984 and played two seasons there, playing principally at first base, catcher, and as a pinch hitter.

After playing one more season (1986) in A-ball, Wockenfuss managed in the minor leagues for several years. He served four years in the Tigers farm system (1987–1990), two years in the Pittsburgh Pirates' farm system (1992–1993), and two years with the Albany-Colonie Diamond Dogs (1996–1997). He was inducted into the Delaware Sports Hall of Fame in 1993.

== Early years ==
Wockenfuss was born in Welch, West Virginia, on February 27, 1949. He attended John Dickinson High School in Wilmington, Delaware. One of the best all-around athletes Dickinson High produced, he lettered in football, basketball, baseball, and track. Wockenfuss played baseball as a pitcher. He played quarterback for the football team and gained notoriety for his use of a drop kick technique to kick extra points after touchdowns.

== Playing career ==
=== Minor leagues ===
Wockenfuss was drafted by the Washington Senators in the 42nd round of the 1967 Major League Baseball June Amateur Draft. He spent five seasons in the Senators' farm system, including stints with the Geneva Senators (1967–1968), Burlington Senators (1969), and Pittsfield Senators (1970–1972). At the outset of his minor league career, Wockenfuss was quickly converted from pitcher to outfielder to catcher.

In June 1973, Wockenfuss was traded by the Texas Rangers (successor to the Senators) to the St. Louis Cardinals along with Mike Nagy in exchange for Jim Bibby. The Cardinals assigned Wockenfuss to their AAA farm team, the Tulsa Oilers. In 60 games for Tulsa, he compiled a .266 batting average and .357 on-base percentage.

=== Detroit Tigers ===
==== 1973–1975 ====
The Cardinals traded Wockenfuss to the Detroit Tigers on December 3, 1973, in exchange for shortstop Lawrence Elliott. Wockenfuss began the 1974 season with the Evansville Triplets, appearing in 84 games and hitting 11 home runs. He was called up by the Tigers that August, when Detroit catcher Jerry Moses was injured. He appeared in his first major league game on August 11, 1974. Wockenfuss struggled in his first major league season, batting only .138 in 13 games.

In 1975, Wockenfuss considered quitting baseball and working full-time at the pizzeria he opened with his brother in Christiana, Delaware. Wockenfuss ended up appearing in 35 games with the Tigers, including 32 games as the team's starting catcher. He hit .229 with four home runs.

==== 1976–1979 ====
Wockenfuss continued as the Tigers' backup catcher, starting 43 games at the position in 1976 and 33 in 1977. His offensive production improved significantly from .222 and three home runs in 1976 to .274 and nine home runs in 1977. Wockenfuss received negative press in 1976, when he tagged a runner out at the plate, gently rolled the ball to the mound (based on the incorrect assumption that the tag play was the third out), allowing Mickey Rivers to score from second base. Wockenfuss later said, "I don't think [Ralph] Houk ever forgave me for that mistake."

During a locker-room speech by an evangelist in May 1976, Wockenfuss testified that he found God and became a born-again Christian. Previously plagued by bitterness and a fierce temper, Wockenfuss later recalled: "I found that it changed my life. I settled down on the field, was able to concentrate, and it made my home life better." His offensive improvement in 1977 followed his adoption of an unorthodox batting stance: feet close together and touching the back line of the batter's box, much of his back facing the pitcher while looking over his left shoulder at the pitcher, bat held above his head, and the fingers on his right hand waggling before each pitch. He began using the new stance while playing in the Puerto Rican Winter League prior to the 1977 season and batting around .390. Wockenfuss credited his new batting stance for his offensive turnaround.

In 1978, with Milt May and Lance Parrish having locked down the catching duties for the Tigers, Wockenfuss moved to the outfield, starting 49 games in right and left field. His offensive production also continued to improve with a .283 batting average and .357 on-base percentage. In 17 at bats as a pinch hitter during the 1978 season, he hit .353.

With the arrival of Sparky Anderson as Detroit's manager in 1979, Wockenfuss saw an increase in playing time. He appeared in 87 games, including 35 games at first base, 20 games at catcher, six games in the outfield, and 14 games as the team's designated hitter. Wockenfuss also hit 15 home runs with 46 runs batted in (RBI). On August 9, 1979, he hit two home runs, including a grand slam, for five RBI and the best game of his career. In January 1980, Wockenfuss was voted by the Wilmington Sportswriters and Broadcasters Association as the Delaware Athlete of the Year for 1979.

==== 1980–1983 ====
Wockenfuss' career peaked in 1980 as he appeared in 126 games for the Tigers (52 at first base, 28 as the designated hitter, 25 at catcher, and 23 in the outfield) and compiled a career-high .390 on-base percentage. He also tallied career highs in home runs (16), runs (56), RBI (65), and bases on balls (64). One sportswriter in July 1980 referred to Wockenfuss, who was also used as a pinch hitter, as "the most versatile player in the majors today."

Wockenfuss continued to be a valuable role-player for Detroit from 1981 to 1983, appearing in 232 games, including 93 as the designated hitter, 58 at catcher, 55 at first base, 12 in the outfield, and two at third base. In 1982, he compiled a career-high .301 batting average.

=== 1984 trade to Philadelphia ===
In mid-March 1984, Wockenfuss noted that he would be happy to be traded to Philadelphia, a 30-minute drive from his home in Wilmington. He drew criticism with further public complaints about his low pay ($200,000) and limited playing time and the high salaries being paid to unnamed "clowns" among his teammates. Mike Downey wrote at the time: "Wockenfuss is someone the Tigers count on. Nobody in baseball is a better hit-and-run man." Unfortunately, Downey added that Wockenfuss also had a reputation as "the clubhouse carp," and his indirect criticism of the Tigers' owner was a "cardinal sin."

On March 24, 1984, the Tigers traded Wockenfuss and Glenn Wilson to the Philadelphia Phillies for Willie Hernández and Dave Bergman The trade immediately paid dividends for the Tigers as Hernández would win both the American League's Cy Young Award and American League Most Valuable Player that season as Detroit won the World Series.

Wockenfuss played two seasons for the Phillies, appearing in 118 games, 46 at first base, 23 at catcher, and two at third base. In 1984, he compiled a .289 batting average and .390 on-base percentage. In 1985, Wockenfuss dropped by more than 100 points to a .162 batting average in 37 at bats, mostly as a pinch hitter. In July 1985, Wockenfuss asked to be traded, preferably to an American League team where he could extend his career as a designated hitter. He later expressed bitterness at how the Phillies treated him in 1985: "They had me there as a bullpen catcher, carrying buckets of balls to the bullpen. They made me feel like a fool. Like a bum." He consequently gave the Phillies an ultimatum to play him or release him. On August 19, the Phillies granted him an unconditional release. Wockenfuss's salary in his final year with the Phillies was $275,000.

=== Comeback attempt in 1986 ===
In the spring of 1986, Wockenfuss showed up at the Tigers' training camp, offered to pay his own way, and begged for another chance to play. He also showed up at the Boston Red Sox training camp, but was turned away. Unable to find any other takers, Wockenfuss signed with the independent, Single-A Miami Marlins in the Florida State League. Wockenfuss said at the time that he was still "hungry" and hoped to sign with a major league club before the end of the season. Wockenfuss ended up staying with the Marlins through the 1986 season, and Miami sportswriter Tom Archdeacon wrote ..."Although his hair is graying, his knees a little banged up from 15 years of catching and his age nearly twice that of most of his teammates, he is still the anchor of the Marlins' team." For the 1986 season, Wockenfuss compiled a .269 batting average and .375 on-base percentage with 10 home runs and 80 RBI in 136 games.

=== Career statistics ===
In 12 major league seasons, Wockenfuss appeared in 795 games, including 266 as a catcher, 184 as a first baseman, 144 as a designated hitter, 110 as an outfielder, and four as a third baseman. He also appeared in 837 minor league games over 10 seasons. He compiled the following career statistics in his 12 major league seasons:

G	PA	AB	R	H	2B	3B	HR	RBI	SB	BB	SO	BA	OBP	SLG	Fld%
795	2373	2072	267	543	73	11	86	310	5	277	278	.262	.349	.432	.981

== Managerial career ==
In October 1986, the Detroit Tigers hired Wockenfuss to manage their minor league club, the Lakeland Tigers. He took a Lakeland squad that finished 54–79 in 1986 and led them to a 74–61 record in 1987. In 1988, he was promoted to manager of the Tigers' Double-A team in Glen Falls, New York. After leading a turnaround at Glen Falls, Wockenfuss was again promoted, becoming manager of the Triple-A Toledo Mud Hens in 1989. He led Toledo to a 69–76 record in 1989. He was fired as Toledo's manager in late April 1990, after the team started with a 10–14 record.

In 1992, Wockenfuss returned to minor league managing ranks, with the Pittsburgh Pirates' Class-A Salem club in the Virginia League. He was promoted in 1993 to be manager of the Class-AA Carolina Mudcats in the Southern League. Wockenfuss missed portions of the 1993 season after undergoing two back surgeries in April and August to address severe back problems. In January 1994, he announced: "My baseball career is over."

Wockenfuss organized the Tri-State Baseball/Softball Academy in 1994 and worked on that business in 1994 and 1995.

In March 1996, Wockenfuss returned to organized baseball as manager of the independent Albany-Colonie Diamond Dogs. He led the team to the Northeast Independent League title in 1996 and returned as manager in 1997.

== Family and later life ==
Wockenfuss married Pamela Lennon in 1971. They had three children, sons John Bradley and Jeremy James, and daughter Caitlin Tara. Wockenfuss and his wife were divorced in 1986. He later remarried to a second wife, Fran, and they had a daughter named Jessica. They eventually divorced. He married Becky Askins in October 2018, having been introduced to her by his siblings. He had four grandchildren.

In 1993, Wockenfuss was inducted into the Delaware Sports Hall of Fame.

Wockenfuss was diagnosed with dementia in November 2018. He died on August 19, 2022, at the age of 73.
