= 1975 Detroit Tigers season =

Major League Baseball season

1975 Detroit Tigers
- League: American League
- Division: East
- Ballpark: Tiger Stadium
- City: Detroit, Michigan
- Owners: John Fetzer
- General managers: Jim Campbell
- Managers: Ralph Houk
- Television: WWJ-TV (George Kell, Larry Osterman, Don Kremer)
- Radio: WJR (Ernie Harwell, Paul Carey)

The 1975 Detroit Tigers season was the team's 75th season and the 64th season at Tiger Stadium. The Tigers compiled a record of 57–102, which was — at the time — the second worst season in franchise history (it now ranks as the sixth). They finished in last place in the American League East, 37½ games behind the Boston Red Sox. Their team batting average of .249 and team ERA of 4.27 were both second worst in the American League. They were outscored by their opponents 786 to 570. The season included a 19-game losing streak, lasting from July 29 through Aug. 15.

== Offseason ==
- November 18, 1974: Ed Brinkman was traded by the Tigers to the St. Louis Cardinals, and Bob Strampe and Dick Sharon were traded by the Tigers to the San Diego Padres as part of a three-team trade. The Padres sent Nate Colbert to the Tigers, and a player to be named later to the Cardinals. The Cardinals sent Alan Foster, Rich Folkers, and Sonny Siebert to the Padres. The Padres completed the deal by sending Danny Breeden to the Cardinals on December 12.
- December 4, 1974: Woodie Fryman was traded by the Tigers to the Montreal Expos for Tom Walker and Terry Humphrey.
- January 9, 1975: Tom Brookens was drafted by the Tigers in the 1st round (4th pick) of the 1975 Major League Baseball draft.
- February 1, 1975: Gene Michael was signed as a free agent by the Tigers.
- March 29, 1975: Reggie Sanders was traded by the Tigers to the Atlanta Braves for Jack Pierce.

== Regular season ==
Worst Seasons in Detroit Tigers History
Rank	Year	Wins	Losses	Win %
1	2003	43	119	.265
2	2019	47	114	.292
3	1952	50	104	.325
4	1996	53	109	.327
5	2002	55	106	.342
6	1975	57	102	.358

=== Season standings ===
AL East
Team	W	L	Pct.	GB	Home	Road
Boston Red Sox	95	65	.594	—	47‍–‍34	48‍–‍31
Baltimore Orioles	90	69	.566	4½	44‍–‍33	46‍–‍36
New York Yankees	83	77	.519	12	43‍–‍35	40‍–‍42
Cleveland Indians	79	80	.497	15½	41‍–‍39	38‍–‍41
Milwaukee Brewers	68	94	.420	28	36‍–‍45	32‍–‍49
Detroit Tigers	57	102	.358	37½	31‍–‍49	26‍–‍53

=== Record vs. opponents ===
1975 American League record Sources:
Team	BAL	BOS	CAL	CWS	CLE	DET	KC	MIL	MIN	NYY	OAK	TEX
Baltimore	—	9–9	6–6	7–4	10–8	12–4	7–5	14–4	6–6	8–10	4–8	7–5
Boston	9–9	—	6–6	8–4	7–11	13–5	7–5	10–8	10–2	11–5	6–6	8–4
California	6–6	6–6	—	9–9	3–9	6–5	4–14	7–5	8–10	7–5	7–11	9–9
Chicago	4–7	4–8	9–9	—	7–5	5–7	9–9	8–4	9–9	6–6	9–9	5–13
Cleveland	8–10	11–7	9–3	5–7	—	12–6	6–6	9–9	3–6	9–9	2–10	5–7
Detroit	4–12	5–13	5–6	7–5	6–12	—	6–6	7–11	4–8	6–12	6–6	1–11
Kansas City	5–7	5–7	14–4	9–9	6–6	6–6	—	7–5	11–7	7–5	11–7	14–4
Milwaukee	4–14	8–10	5–7	4–8	9–9	11–7	5–7	—	2–10	9–9	5–7	6–6
Minnesota	6–6	2–10	10–8	9–9	6–3	8–4	7–11	10–2	—	4–8	6–12	8–10
New York	10–8	5–11	5–7	6–6	9–9	12–6	5–7	9–9	8–4	—	6–6	8–4
Oakland	8–4	6–6	11–7	9–9	10–2	6–6	11–7	7–5	12–6	6–6	—	12–6
Texas	5–7	4–8	9–9	13–5	7–5	11–1	4–14	6–6	10–8	4–8	6–12	—

=== Notable transactions ===
- June 15, 1975: Nate Colbert was purchased from the Tigers by the Montreal Expos.

=== Roster ===
1975 Detroit Tigers
Roster
Pitchers: 36 Fernando Arroyo; 21 Ray Bare; 28 Ike Brookens; 15 Joe Coleman; 48 Ed Glynn; 49 Steve Grilli; 18 John Hiller; 30 Lerrin LaGrow; 19 Dave Lemanczyk; 29 Mickey Lolich; 37 Tom Makowski; 39 Gene Pentz; 34 Bob Reynolds; 31 Vern Ruhle; 32 Tom Walker	Catchers: 11 Bill Freehan; 47 Terry Humphrey; 10 Gene Lamont; 45 John Wockenfuss; Infielders: 9 Nate Colbert; 2 John Knox; 40 Jerry Manuel; 16 Gene Michael; 27 Jack Pierce; 4 Aurelio Rodríguez; 9 Chuck Scrivener; 3 Gary Sutherland; 7 Tom Veryzer	Outfielders: 43 Billy Baldwin; 42 Art James; 8 Ron LeFlore; 25 Dan Meyer; 34 Bob Molinaro; 22 Ben Oglivie; 44 Leon Roberts; 24 Mickey Stanley; Other batters: 26 Gates Brown; 23 Willie Horton	Manager: 35 Ralph Houk; Coaches: 52 Steve Hamilton (Pitching); 50 Jim Hegan (Bullpen); 51 Joe Schultz (Third Base); 53 Dick Tracewski (First Base)

== Player stats ==
= Indicates team leader

=== Batting ===
==== Starters by position ====
Note: Pos = Position; G = Games played; AB = At bats; H = Hits; Avg. = Batting average; HR = Home runs; RBI = Runs batted in

Pos	Player	G	AB	H	Avg.	HR	RBI
C	Bill Freehan	120	427	105	.246	14	47
1B	Jack Pierce	53	170	40	.235	8	22
2B	Gary Sutherland	129	503	130	.258	6	39
3B	Aurelio Rodríguez	151	507	124	.245	13	60
SS	Tom Veryzer	128	404	102	.252	5	48
LF	Ben Oglivie	100	332	95	.286	9	36
CF	Ron LeFlore	136	550	142	.258	8	37
RF	Leon Roberts	129	447	115	.257	10	38
DH	Willie Horton	159	615	169	.275	25	92

==== Other batters ====
Note: G = Games played; AB = At bats; H = Hits; Avg. = Batting average; HR = Home runs; RBI = Runs batted in

Player	G	AB	H	Avg.	HR	RBI
Dan Meyer	122	470	111	.236	8	47
Mickey Stanley	52	164	42	.256	3	19
Nate Colbert	45	156	23	.147	4	18
Gene Michael	56	145	31	.214	3	13
John Wockenfuss	35	118	27	.229	4	13
Billy Baldwin	30	95	21	.221	4	8
John Knox	43	86	23	.267	0	2
Terry Humphrey	18	41	10	.244	0	1
Art James	11	40	9	.225	0	1
Gates Brown	47	35	6	.171	1	3
Bob Molinaro	6	19	5	.263	0	1
Jerry Manuel	6	18	1	.056	0	0
Chuck Scrivener	4	16	4	.250	0	0
Gene Lamont	4	8	3	.375	0	1

=== Pitching ===
==== Starting pitchers ====
Note: G = Games; IP = Innings pitched; W = Wins; L = Losses; ERA = Earned run average; SO = Strikeouts

Player	G	IP	W	L	ERA	SO
Mickey Lolich	32	240.2	12	18	3.78	139
Joe Coleman	31	201.0	10	18	5.55	125
Vern Ruhle	32	190.0	11	12	4.03	67
Lerrin LaGrow	32	164.1	7	14	4.38	75
Ray Bare	29	150.2	8	13	4.48	71

==== Other pitchers ====
Note: G = Games; IP = Innings pitched; W = Wins; L = Losses; ERA = Earned run average; SO = Strikeouts

Player	G	IP	W	L	ERA	SO
Tom Walker	36	115.1	3	8	4.45	60
Dave Lemanczyk	26	109.0	2	7	4.46	67
Ed Glynn	3	14.2	0	2	4.30	8

==== Relief pitchers ====
Note: G = Games pitched; W = Wins; L= Losses; SV = Saves; GF = Games finished; ERA = Earned run average; SO = Strikeouts

Player	G	W	L	SV	GF	ERA	SO
John Hiller	36	2	3	14	34	2.17	87
Bob Reynolds	21	0	2	3	14	4.67	26
Fernando Arroyo	14	2	1	0	6	4.56	25
Gene Pentz	13	0	4	0	11	3.20	21
Ike Brookens	3	0	0	0	2	5.23	8
Tom Makowski	3	0	0	0	2	4.82	3
Steve Grilli	3	0	0	0	3	1.35	5

== Awards and honors ==
1975 Major League Baseball All-Star Game Bill Freehan, reserve

=== League top ten finishers ===
Joe Coleman

- AL leader in wild pitches (15)
- #2 in MLB in losses (18)
- #2 in MLB in earned runs allowed (124)
- #4 in AL in hit batsmen(9)

Ron LeFlore

- #2 in AL in strikeouts (139)
- #2 in MLB in times caught stealing (20)

Mickey Lolich

- #2 in MLB in losses (18)
- #6 in MLB in complete games (19)

Dan Meyer

- AL leader in at bats per strikeout (18.8)

Willie Horton

- #3 in AL in game played (159)
- #4 in AL in at bats (615)

=== Players ranking among top 100 all time at position ===
The following members of the 1975 Detroit Tigers are among the Top 100 of all time at their position, as ranked by The Bill James Historical Baseball Abstract in 2001:

- Bill Freehan: 12th best catcher of all time
- Aurelio Rodríguez: 91st best third baseman of all time
- Ron LeFlore: 80th best center fielder of all time
- Ben Oglivie: 64th best left fielder of all time
- Willie Horton: 55th best left fielder of all time (played DH for 1975 Tigers)
- Mickey Lolich: 72nd best pitcher of all time

== Farm system ==
Level	Team	League	Manager
AAA	Evansville Triplets	American Association	Fred Hatfield
AA	Montgomery Rebels	Southern League	Les Moss
A	Lakeland Tigers	Florida State League	Stubby Overmire
A	Clinton Pilots	Midwest League	Jim Leyland
Rookie	Bristol Tigers	Appalachian League	Joe Lewis

LEAGUE CHAMPIONS: Evansville, Montgomery
