= List of Detroit Tigers first-round draft picks =

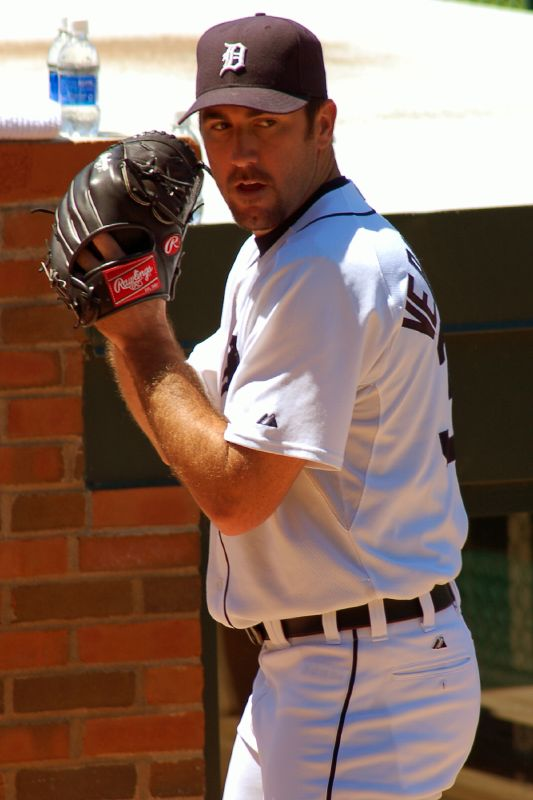
Justin Verlander (2004) is the only first-round pick of the Detroit Tigers to win the Rookie of the Year award.

The Detroit Tigers are a Major League Baseball (MLB) franchise based in Detroit, Michigan. They play in the American League Central division. Since the institution of MLB's Rule 4 Draft, the Tigers have selected 66 players in the first round. Officially known as the "First-Year Player Draft", the Rule 4 Draft is MLB's primary mechanism for assigning players from high schools, colleges, and other amateur clubs to its franchises. The draft order is determined based on the previous season's standings, with the team possessing the worst record receiving the first pick. In addition, teams which lost free agents in the previous off-season may be awarded compensatory or supplementary picks.

Of the 66 players picked in the first round by Detroit, 32 have been pitchers, the most of any position; 25 of these were right-handed, while five were left-handed. Thirteen outfielders were selected, while five shortstops, five catchers, four third basemen, three first basemen, and two second baseman were taken as well. One additional player, Lance Parrish (1974), was drafted as an infielder but ultimately spent the majority of his Major League career at catcher. Thirteen of the players came from high schools or universities in the state of California, followed by Texas with ten players. The Tigers have also drafted five players from their home state of Michigan.

Two of the Tigers' first-round picks have won championships with the franchise. Parrish and Kirk Gibson (1978) won a World Series title on the 1984 championship team. Justin Verlander (2004) is the only first-round pick of the Tigers to win the Rookie of the Year Award, taking the honor in 2006. Two Tigers first-round picks have won the Cy Young Award, both in the American League; Verlander won the award in 2011 with the Tigers and 2007 pick Rick Porcello won in 2016 with the Boston Red Sox. None of their first-round picks have been elected to the Baseball Hall of Fame. Justin Verlander became the first player who was drafted in the 1st round of the draft to win the Most Valuable Player award while with the Tigers in the 2011 season. Gibson won the MVP award in his first year with the Los Angeles Dodgers in 1988.

The Tigers have made ten selections in the supplemental round of the draft and have made the first overall selection three times (1997, 2018, and 2020). They have also had eight compensatory picks since the institution of the First-Year Player Draft in 1965. These additional picks are provided when a team loses a particularly valuable free agent in the previous off-season,^{[V]} or, more recently, if a team fails to sign a draft pick from the previous year. The Tigers failed to sign their 1966 first-round pick, Rick Konik, but they received no compensatory pick.

== Key ==
Year	Each year links to an article about that year's Major League Baseball draft.
Position	Indicates the secondary/collegiate position at which the player was drafted, rather than the professional position the player may have gone on to play
Pick	Indicates the number of the pick
*	Player did not sign with the Tigers
§	Indicates a supplemental pick
'84	Player was a member of the Tigers' 1984 championship team

== Picks ==
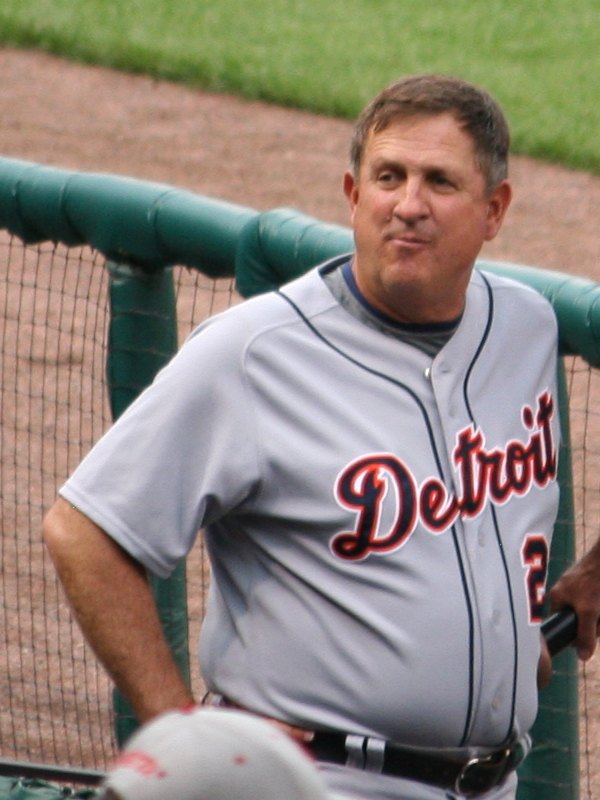
Gene Lamont (1965) was the Tigers' first ever selection in the First Year Player Draft.

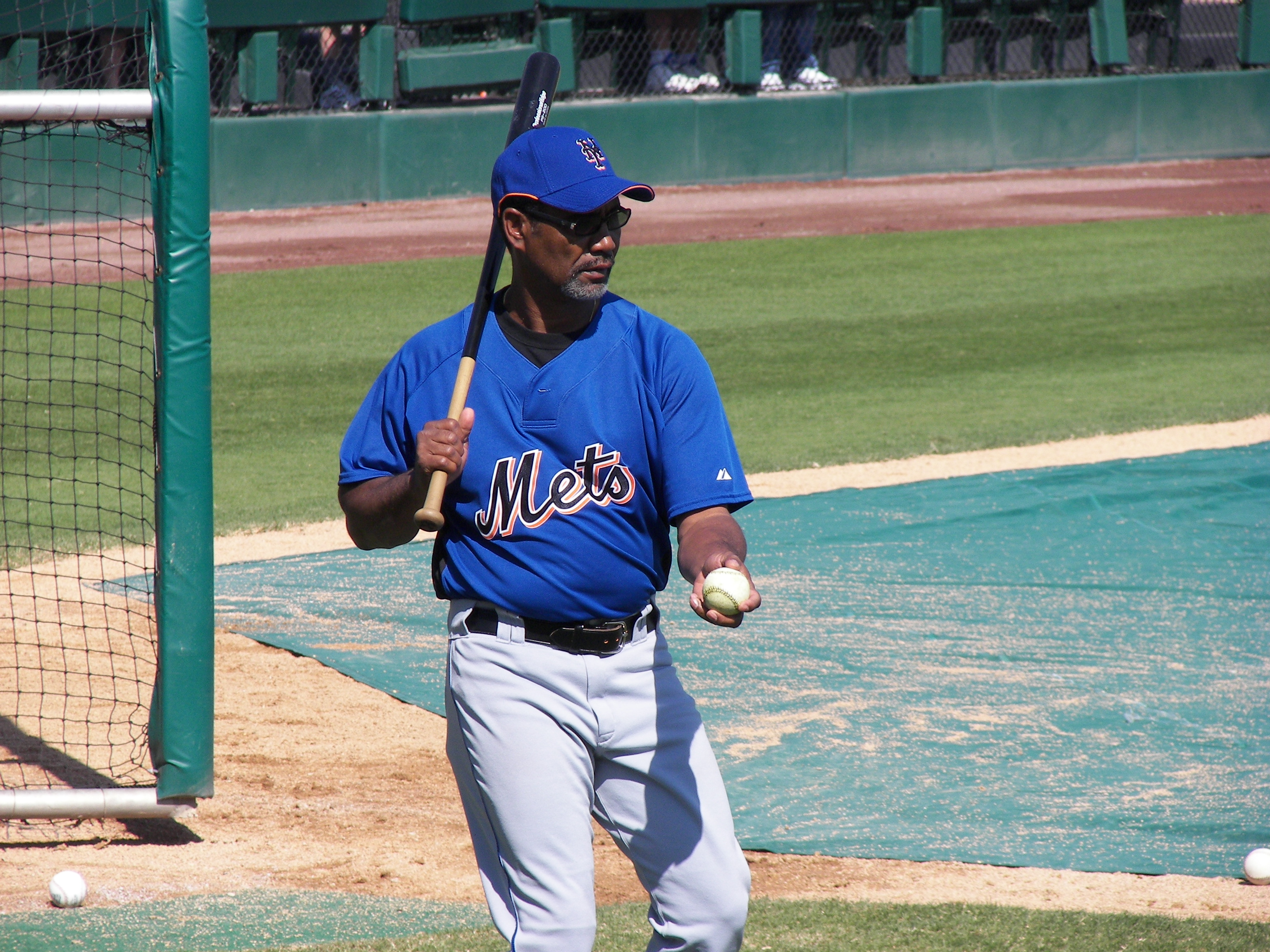
Jerry Manuel (1972) was one of twelve players taken by the Tigers in the first round from California.

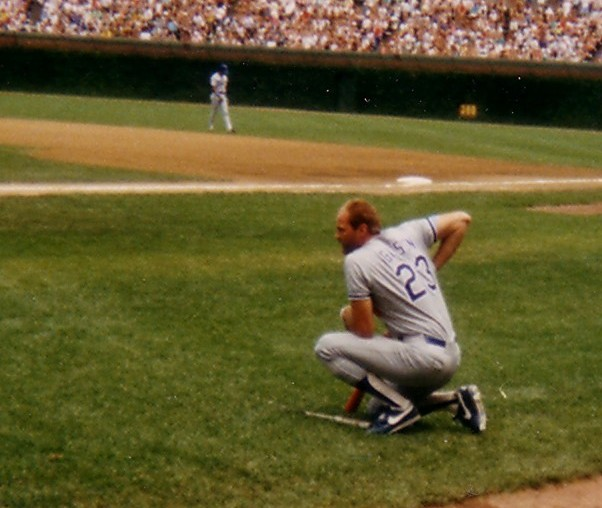
Kirk Gibson (1978) won a World Series with the Tigers in 1984.

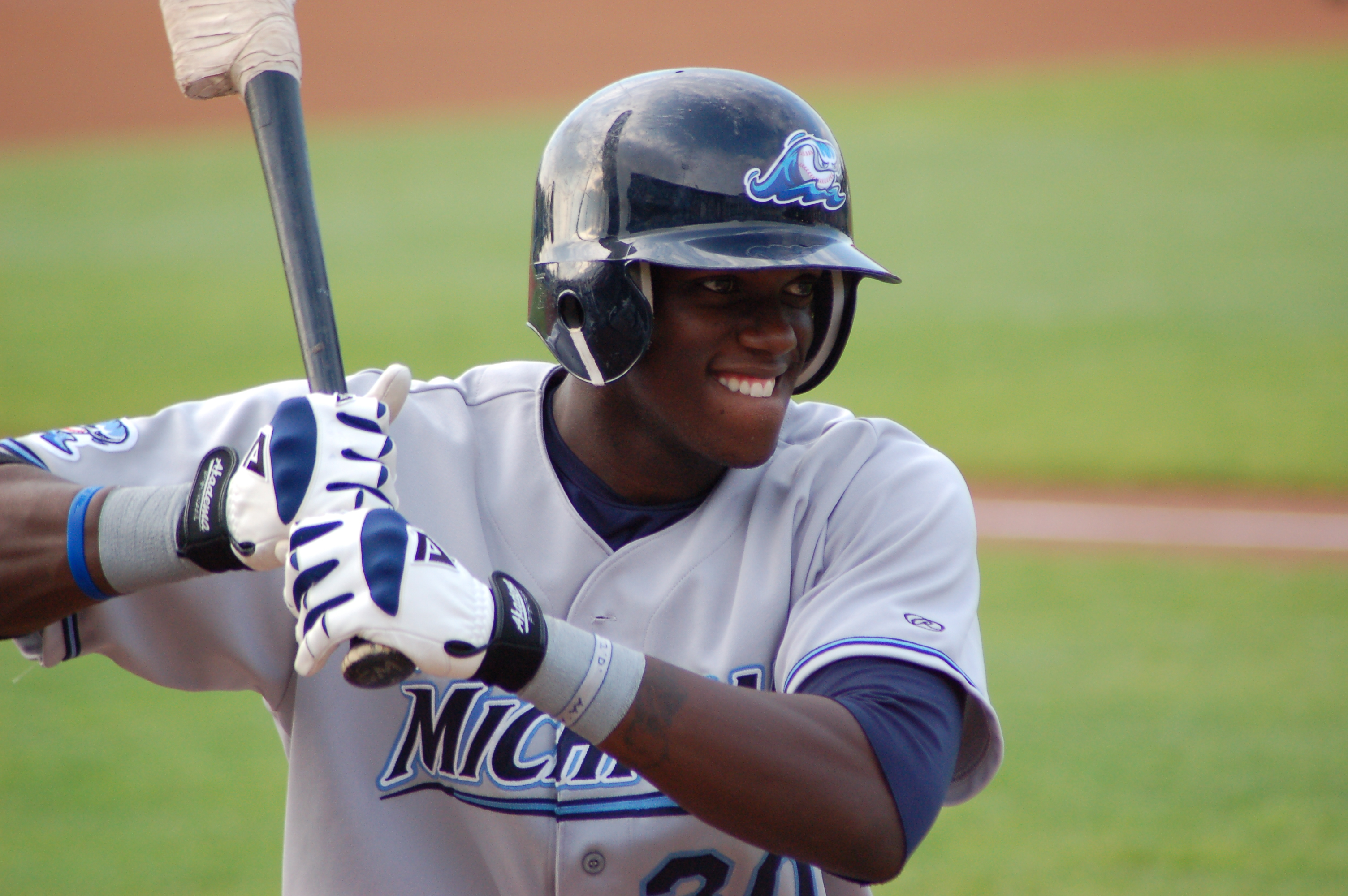
Cameron Maybin (2005) was one of three first-round draft picks of the Tigers taken from North Carolina from 2003 to 2006.

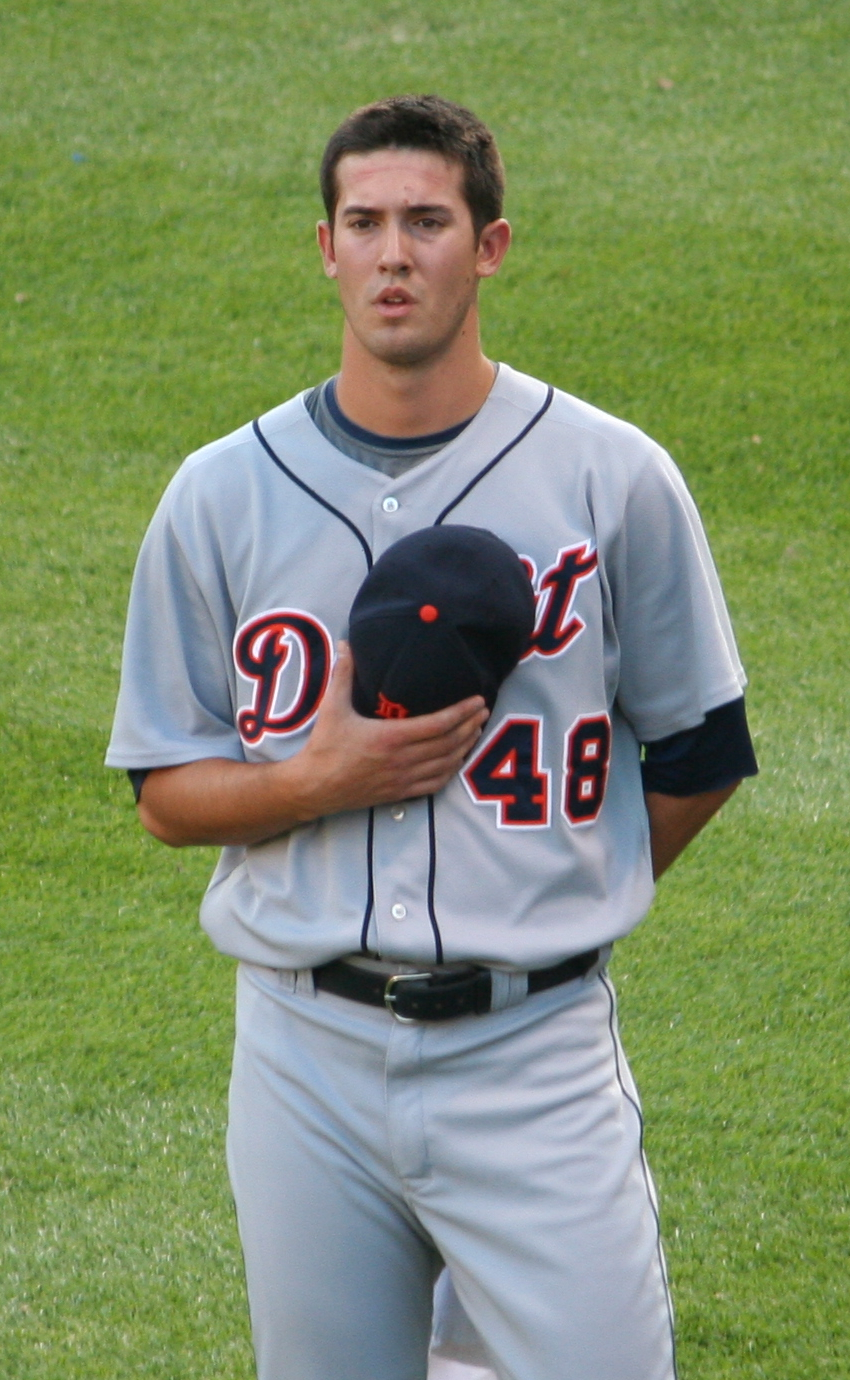
Rick Porcello was taken with the 27th pick of the 2007 draft, the deepest first-round non-compensatory selection the Tigers have ever made.

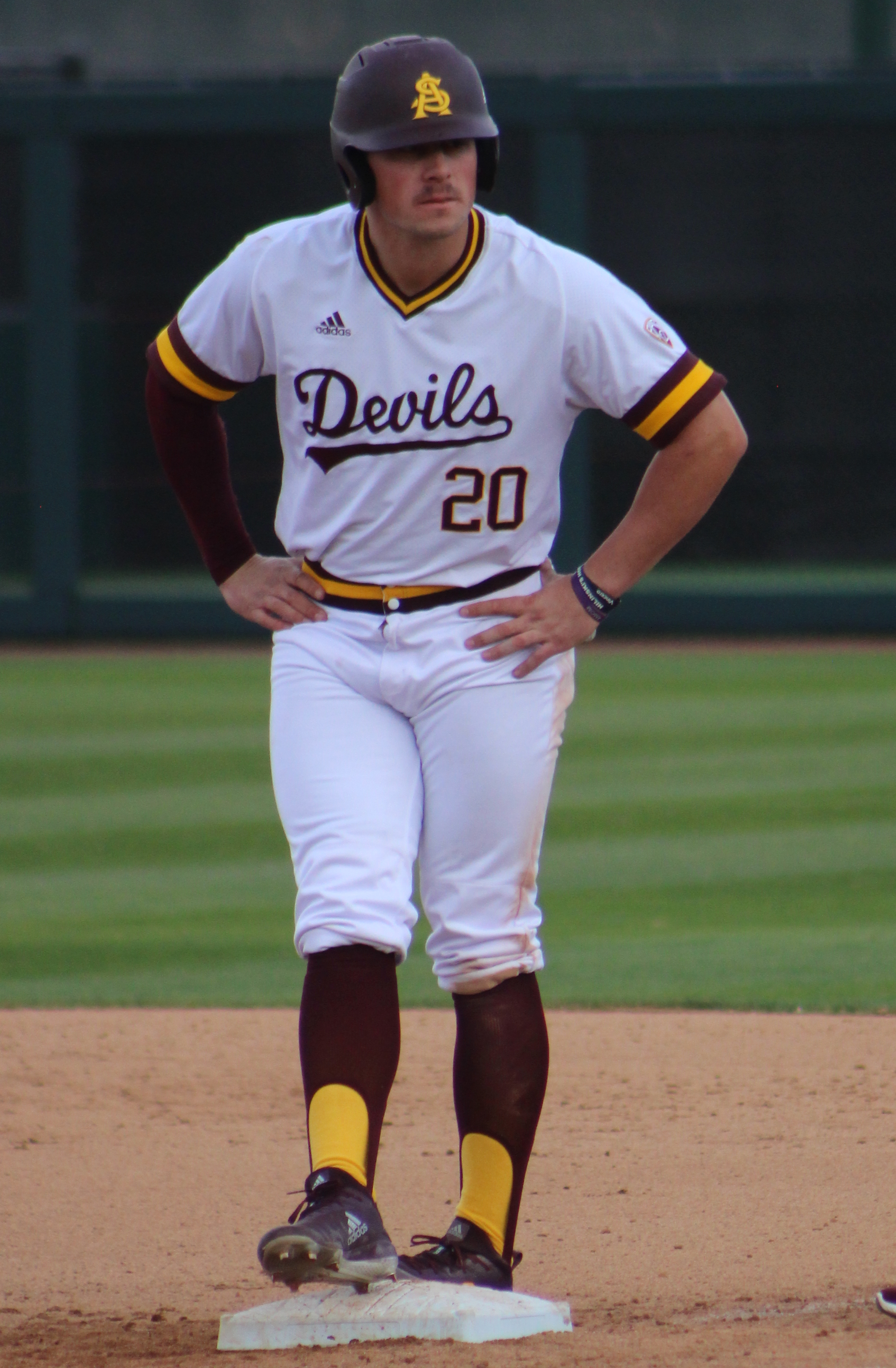
Spencer Torkelson (2020) was Detroit's second first-overall pick in a span of three years.

Year	Name	Position	School (Location)	Pick	Ref
1965	Gene Lamont	Catcher	Hiawatha High School (Kirkland, Illinois)	13	
1966	Rick Konik*	First baseman	St. Andrews High School (Detroit, Michigan)	14	
1967	Jim Foor	Left-handed pitcher	McCluer High School (Florissant, Missouri)	15	
1968	Robert Robinson	Outfielder	Thomas Dale High School (Chester, Virginia)	18	
1969	John Young	First baseman	Enterprise High School (Redding, California)	19	
1970	Terry Mappin	Catcher	Durrett High School (Louisville, Kentucky)	20	
1971	Tom Veryzer	Shortstop	Islip High School (Islip, New York)	11	
1972	Jerry Manuel	Shortstop	Cordova High School (Rancho Cordova, California)	20	
1973	Charles Bates	Third baseman	California State University, Los Angeles (Los Angeles, California)	19	
1974	Lance Parrish'84	Infielder	Walnut High School (Walnut, California)	16	
1975	Les Filkins	Outfielder	George Washington High School (Chicago, Illinois)	3	
1976	Pat Underwood	Left-handed pitcher	Kokomo High School (Kokomo, Indiana)	2	
1977	Kevin Richards	Right-handed pitcher	Roosevelt High School (Wyandotte, Michigan)	5	
1978	Kirk Gibson'84	Outfielder	Michigan State University (East Lansing, Michigan)	12	
1979	Rick Leach	Outfielder	University of Michigan (Ann Arbor, Michigan)	13	
1979	Chris Baker	Outfielder	Livonia Franklin High School (Dearborn Heights, Michigan)	23^{[a]}	
1980	Glenn Wilson	Third baseman	Sam Houston State University (Huntsville, Texas)	18	
1981	Ricky Barlow	Right-handed pitcher	Woodville High School (Woodville, Texas)	17	
1982	Rich Monteleone	Right-handed pitcher	Tampa Catholic High School (Tampa, Florida)	20	
1983	Wayne Dotson	Right-handed pitcher	Estacado High School (Lubbock, Texas)	15	
1984	no first-round pick^{[b]}				
1985	Randy Nosek	Right-handed pitcher	Chillicothe High School (Chillicothe, Missouri)	26	
1986	Phil Clark	Catcher	Crockett High School (Crockett, Texas)	18	
1987	Bill Henderson	Catcher	Westminster Christian High School (Miami, Florida)	20^{[c]}	
1987	Steve Pegues	Outfielder	Pontotoc High School (Pontotoc, Mississippi)	21	
1987	Travis Fryman	Shortstop	Gonzalez Tate High School (Pensacola, Florida)	30^{§}^{[d]}	
1988	Rico Brogna	First baseman	Watertown High School (Watertown, Connecticut)	26	
1989	Greg Gohr	Right-handed pitcher	Santa Clara University (Santa Clara, California)	21	
1990	Tony Clark	Outfielder	Christian High School (El Cajon, California)	2	
1991	Justin Thompson	Left-handed pitcher	Klein Oak High School (Spring, Texas)	32^{§}^{[e]}	
1991	Trever Miller	Left-handed pitcher	Trinity High School (St. Matthews, Kentucky)	41^{§}^{[f]}	
1992	Rick Greene	Right-handed pitcher	Louisiana State University (Baton Rouge, Louisiana)	16	
1993	Matt Brunson	Shortstop	Cherry Creek High School (Englewood, Colorado)	9	
1994	Cade Gaspar	Right-handed pitcher	Pepperdine University (Malibu, California)	18	
1995	Mike Drumright	Right-handed pitcher	Wichita State University (Wichita, Kansas)	11	
1996	Seth Greisinger	Right-handed pitcher	University of Virginia (Charlottesville, Virginia)	6	
1997	Matt Anderson	Right-handed pitcher	Rice University (Houston, Texas)	1	
1998	Jeff Weaver	Right-handed pitcher	California State University, Fresno (Fresno, California)	14	
1998	Nate Cornejo	Right-handed pitcher	Wellington High School (Wellington, Kansas)	34^{§}^{[g]}	
1999	Eric Munson	Catcher	University of Southern California (Los Angeles, California)	3	
2000	Matthew Wheatland	Right-handed pitcher	Rancho Bernardo High School (San Diego, California)	8	
2001	Kenny Baugh	Right-handed pitcher	Rice University (Houston, Texas)	11	
2001	Mike Woods	Second baseman	Southern University (Baton Rouge, Louisiana)	32^{§}^{[h]}	
2002	Scott Moore	Shortstop	Cypress High School (Cypress, California)	8	
2003	Kyle Sleeth	Right-handed pitcher	Wake Forest University (Winston-Salem, North Carolina)	21	
2004	Justin Verlander	Right-handed pitcher	Old Dominion University (Norfolk, Virginia)	2	
2005	Cameron Maybin	Outfielder	T.C. Roberson High School (Arden, North Carolina)	10	
2006	Andrew Miller	Left-handed pitcher	University of North Carolina at Chapel Hill (Chapel Hill, North Carolina)	6	
2007	Rick Porcello	Right-handed pitcher	Seton Hall Prep High School (West Orange, New Jersey)	27	
2007	Brandon Hamilton	Outfielder	Stanhope Elmore High School (Millbrook, Alabama)	60^{§}^{[i]}	
2008	Ryan Perry	Right-handed pitcher	University of Arizona (Tucson, Arizona)	21	
2009	Jacob Turner	Right-handed pitcher	Westminster Christian Academy (St. Louis, Missouri)	9	
2010	Nick Castellanos	Third baseman	Archbishop McCarthy High School (Southwest Ranches, Florida)	44^{§}^{[j]}	
2010	Chance Ruffin	Right-handed pitcher	The University of Texas at Austin (Austin, Texas)	48^{§}^{[l]}	
2011	no first-round pick^{[m]}				
2012	no first-round pick^{[n]}				
2013	Jonathon Crawford	Right-handed pitcher	University of Florida (Gainesville, Florida)	20	
2013	Corey Knebel	Right-handed pitcher	University of Texas at Austin (Austin, Texas)	39^{§}^{[o]}	
2014	Derek Hill	Outfielder	Elk Grove High School (Elk Grove, California)	23	
2015	Beau Burrows	Right-handed pitcher	Weatherford High School (Weatherford, Texas)	22	
2015	Christin Stewart	Outfielder	University of Tennessee (Knoxville, Tennessee)	34^{§}^{[p]}	
2016	Matt Manning	Right-handed pitcher	Sheldon High School (Sacramento, California)	9	
2017	Alex Faedo	Right-handed pitcher	University of Florida (Tampa, Florida)	18	
2018	Casey Mize	Right-handed pitcher	Auburn University (Auburn, Alabama)	1	
2019	Riley Greene	Outfielder	Hagerty High School (Oviedo, Florida)	5	
2020	Spencer Torkelson	Third baseman	Arizona State (Tempe, Arizona)	1	
2021	Jackson Jobe	Right-handed pitcher	Heritage Hall School (Oklahoma City, Oklahoma)	3	
2022	Jace Jung	Second baseman	Texas Tech (Lubbock, Texas)	12	
2023	Max Clark	Outfielder	Franklin Community High School (Franklin, Indiana)	3	
2024	Bryce Rainer	Shortstop	Harvard-Westlake High School (Los Angeles, California)	11	
2025	Jordan Yost	Shortstop	Sickles High School (Citrus Park, Florida)	24	
2025	Michael Oliveto	Catcher	Hauppauge High School (Hauppauge, New York)	34^{§}	
2026	Cameron Flukey	Right-handed pitcher	Coastal Carolina (Conway, South Carolina)	22	

== See also ==
- Detroit Tigers minor league players

== Footnotes ==
- ^{V} Through the 2012 draft, free agents were evaluated by the Elias Sports Bureau and rated "Type A", "Type B", or not compensation-eligible. If a team offered arbitration to a player but that player refused and subsequently signed with another team, the original team was able to receive additional draft picks. If a "Type A" free agent left in this way, his previous team received a supplemental pick and a compensatory pick from the team with which he signed. If a "Type B" free agent left in this way, his previous team received only a supplemental pick. Since the 2013 draft, free agents are no longer classified by type; instead, compensatory picks are only awarded if the team offered its free agent a contract worth at least the average of the 125 current richest MLB contracts. However, if the free agent's last team acquired the player in a trade during the last year of his contract, it is ineligible to receive compensatory picks for that player.
- ^{a} The Tigers gained a compensatory first-round pick in 1979 from the Milwaukee Brewers as compensation for losing free agent Jim Slaton.
- ^{b} The Tigers lost their first-round pick in 1984 to the San Francisco Giants as compensation for signing free agent Darrell Evans.
- ^{c} The Tigers gained a compensatory first-round pick in 1987 from the Philadelphia Phillies for losing free agent Lance Parrish.
- ^{d} The Tigers gained a supplemental first-round pick in 1987 for losing free agent Lance Parrish.
- ^{e} The Tigers lost their initial first-round pick in 1991 to the Milwaukee Brewers for signing free agent Rob Deer and gained a supplemental first-round pick for losing free agent Jack Morris.
- ^{f} The Tigers gained a supplemental first-round pick in 1991 for losing free agent Mike Heath.
- ^{g} The Tigers gained a supplemental first-round pick in 1998 for losing free agent Willie Blair.
- ^{h} The Tigers gained a supplemental first-round pick in 2001 for losing free agent Juan González.
- ^{i} The Tigers gained a supplemental first-round pick in 2007 for losing free agent Jamie Walker.
- ^{j} The Tigers lost their initial first-round pick in 2010 to the Houston Astros for signing free agent José Valverde and gained a supplemental first-round pick for losing free agent Brandon Lyon.
- ^{k} The Tigers gained a supplemental first-round pick in 2010 for losing free agent Iván Rodríguez.
- ^{l} The Tigers gained a supplemental first-round pick in 2010 for losing free agent Fernando Rodney.
- ^{m} The Tigers lost their first-round pick in 2011 to the Boston Red Sox as compensation for signing free agent Víctor Martínez.
- ^{n} The Tigers lost their first-round pick in 2012 to the Milwaukee Brewers as compensation for signing free agent Prince Fielder.
- ^{o} The Marlins gained an extra first-round pick in 2013 as a result of the 2012 Competitive Balance Lottery and the Tigers traded for that pick.
- ^{p} The Tigers gained a supplemental first-round pick in 2015 for losing free agent Max Scherzer.
