= Filkins (surname) =

Filkins is a surname. Notable people with the surname include:

- Dexter Filkins (born 1961), American journalist
- Grace Filkins (1865–1962), American stage actress
- Les Filkins (born 1956), American baseball player
- Perry Filkins (born 1998), American mixed martial artist
- Peter Filkins, American poet and translator
- Zach Filkins (born 1978), American musician and songwriter
