= Bob Molinaro =

American baseball player (born 1950)

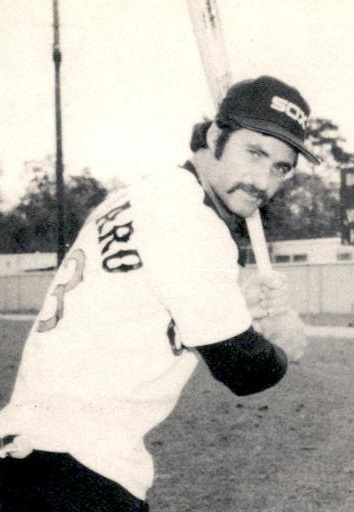
- Outfielder
- Born: May 21, 1950 (age 76); Newark, New Jersey, U.S.
- Batted: Left Threw: Right

MLB debut
- September 18, 1975, for the Detroit Tigers

Last MLB appearance
- October 2, 1983, for the Detroit Tigers

MLB statistics
- Batting average: .264
- Home runs: 14
- Runs batted in: 90
- Stats at Baseball Reference

Teams
- Detroit Tigers (1975, 1977); Chicago White Sox (1977–1978); Baltimore Orioles (1979); Chicago White Sox (1980–1981); Chicago Cubs (1982); Philadelphia Phillies (1982–1983); Detroit Tigers (1983)

Robert Joseph Molinaro (born May 21, 1950) is an American former professional baseball outfielder in the minor and major leagues in a career that lasted 18 years. His baseball career began in 1968, and lasted until 1985. During that time Molinaro played for 13 different teams, in seven different leagues.

Born in Newark, New Jersey, Molinaro played baseball at Essex Catholic High School.

== Playing career ==
=== Minor league baseball ===
Molinaro's career in professional baseball began on June 7, 1968, when he was drafted by the Detroit Tigers in the second round of the 1968 MLB draft. Molinaro signed with the Tigers 10 days later.

Molinaro was then assigned to the rookie class Gulf Coast League Tigers for the 1968 season. He was promoted to Class A the following season and played in the Carolina League for the Rocky Mount Leafs in 1969. After the 1969 season, Molinaro was once again promoted up the ranks of the Tigers' system to Class Double A where he would spend the next two seasons, 1970 and 1971, playing for the Montgomery Rebels of the Southern League.

In 1972 Molinaro finally moved up to Triple A and played the season with the Toledo Mud Hens of the International League. In 1973 he returned to Toledo and also spent time back with the Rebels. After that, he played from 1974 through 1977 for the Tigers' new Triple A club, the Evansville Triplets of the American Association.

=== Major league baseball ===
Molinaro made his major league debut with the Detroit Tigers on September 18, 1975. The first three hits of his MLB career came in a 5–1 victory over the Boston Red Sox at Tiger Stadium two days later on September 20. His first was a one-out triple to left field off Luis Tiant before scoring the Tigers' second run of the game on a Ben Oglivie single in the third. His second was a two-out RBI single that scored Tom Veryzer and ended Tiant's afternoon one inning later in the fourth. He went on to play four more games for the Tigers that season, plus a single game in 1977. On September 22 of that year, Molinaro was selected off waivers by the Chicago White Sox, and he played in four games for the White Sox that season.

Molinaro played a full season with the White Sox in 1978, before heading back to the minor leagues for the 1979 season, which saw him play for the American Association's Iowa Oaks. Molinaro did have another brief stay in the major leagues in 1979 when he played eight games for the Baltimore Orioles. Once again, he was back in a White Sox uniform, and playing full-time for them in 1980 and 1981.

After two more years with the White Sox, Molinaro was sent to the Chicago Cubs on March 29, 1982, to complete an earlier deal made on August 15, 1981. The White Sox sent a player to be named later (PTBNL) to the Cubs, also for a player to be named later, who turned out to be Lynn McGlothen. The White Sox eventually sent Molinaro to the Cubs to complete the trade.

After starting the 1982 season with the Cubs and seeing 65 games of action, Molinaro's contract was purchased by the Philadelphia Phillies on September 2. He was supposed to have been acquired by the Phillies two days earlier on August 31 as the PTBNL to complete a December 8, 1981 transaction that also sent Mike Krukow to Philadelphia for Keith Moreland, Dickie Noles and Dan Larson. That part of the deal was canceled on September 1 by the Office of the Commissioner of Baseball which stated that the acquisition of Molinaro could only be made if he "had not been on the active list of any club in the (Phillies') league during any part of a (regular) season between the date of the agreement and the date of the assignment." He appeared in 19 games with the Phillies that season.

The 1983 season was Molinaro's last in the majors. After returning to the Phillies and playing in 19 games, he was released on June 6 and found himself back in the minor league's this time playing for the Triple A Indianapolis Indians.

A return to the Major Leagues came that September when on the 1st Molinaro was signed as a free agent by the Detroit Tigers. Molinaro only played eight more Major League games with his return to the Tigers. Molinaro's career came to a close after sitting out the 1984 season, although he returned to play one last pro season with the Triple A International League's Rochester Red Wings in 1985.

In between, he pitched winter ball with the Leones del Caracas club of the Venezuelan League between the 1977 and 1979 seasons.

=== Post-playing career ===
After his playing career had ended, Molinaro remained active in baseball as a manager with the Hagerstown Suns of the Class A South Atlantic League from 1986 to 1987, then on to single seasons as a manager with the Canton–Akron Indians of the Eastern League in 1989, the Colorado Springs Sky Sox of the Triple A Pacific Coast League in 1990, and finally with the Port Charlotte Rangers of the Class A Florida State League in 1991.

Preceded by Mike Hargrove	Colorado Springs Sky Sox Manager; 1990	Succeeded by Charlie Manuel
