= Chuck Scrivener =

American baseball player (born 1947)

- Shortstop
- Born: October 3, 1947 (age 79); Alexandria, Virginia, U.S.
- Batted: Right Threw: Right

MLB debut
- September 18, 1975, for the Detroit Tigers

Last MLB appearance
- September 29, 1977, for the Detroit Tigers

MLB statistics
- Batting average: .190
- Home runs: 2
- Runs batted in: 18
- Stats at Baseball Reference

Teams
- Detroit Tigers (1975–77)

Wayne Allison Scrivener, commonly known as "Chuck Scrivener" (born October 3, 1947), is an American former baseball infielder.

Scrivener was called up to the Detroit Tigers in September 1975 and remained with the club through the end of the 1977 season. He appeared in 145 major league games as a shortstop (89 games), second baseman (51 games), and third baseman (11 games), and compiled a.190 batting average with two home runs and 18 RBIs.

He played for Baltimore Polytechnic Institute and Community College of Baltimore before being drafted by the Tigers in the 1968 Major League Baseball January Draft. He spent a total of 11 seasons in the Tigers organization, including three seasons with the Triple-A Toledo Mud Hens (1971-1973) and another three with the Triple-A Evansville Triplets (1974, 1975 and 1978).

Scrivener is the nephew of the late Jack Crouch who played for the Saint Louis Browns and Cincinnati Reds between 1930 and 1933.

== Early years ==
Scrivener was born in 1947 in Alexandria, Virginia. He attended high school at Baltimore Polytechnic Institute (Poly). As a senior at Poly, he won the 1966 Maryland Scholastic Association batting championship with a.529 batting average and also led the association in RBIs, doubles, and stolen bases. He next attended the Community College of Baltimore, where he was selected as the first-team shortstop on the 1968 Tri-State Conference Baseball All Star Team.

== Detroit Tigers organization (1968-1978) ==
Scrivener was drafted by the Detroit Tigers in the second round of the 1968 Major League Baseball January Draft, Secondary Phase. He spent the next eight years in the Tigers' farm system, playing for the Lakeland Tigers (1968), Montgomery Rebels (1969-1971), Rocky Mount Leafs (1969-1970), Toledo Mud Hens (1971-1973), and Evansville Triplets (1974-1975). Scrivener was described by Detroit sports writer Jim Hawkins as "the forgotten man in the Tigers' farm system, forever playing second-string behind each new promising shortstop that came along."

During the 1975 season, with an injury to Mark Wagner, Scrivener became the starting shortstop in Evansville and had his best season, tallying 23 doubles, six triples, 10 home runs, and 65 RBIs. His performance helped Evansville win the Junior World Series title and earned him a shot with the Tigers in September 1975. He made his major league debut on September 18, 1975, at age 27. He appeared in four games for the 1975 Tigers and had four hits, a double, and a stolen base in 16 at bats.

Scrivener remained with the Tigers throughout the 1976 season. He replaced Gene Michael at the Tigers' utility infielder and was described by Detroit scout Jack Tigh as "an excellent defensive ballplayer" and "10 times the ballplayer Gene Michael was last season." An injury to Tom Veryzer in May 1976 provided Scrivener with his first opportunity to start at shortstop. When he hit his first major league home run on August 8, he said it was easily his greatest day in baseball and added: "I wondered if I'd ever hit a home run in the major leagues. It was a real thrill for me . . . I was just trying to keep myself from being too excited, but I couldn't keep the smile off my face.."

Scrivener appeared in a total of 80 games in 1976, including 38 starts at second base and 28 at shortstop. He compiled a.221 batting average and a.282 on-base percentage with seven doubles, a triple, and two home runs. Interviewed in June 1976, Scrivener took no offense at being referred to as a utility player: "I'm just a borderline ball player, at best. I'm just happy to be a fill-in guy. . . . Some guys never know their limitations, but I know mine."

Scrivener again remained with the Tigers in 1977, though he spent most of the season on the bench. He appeared in 61 games but was a starter in only 21 games. His batting average dropped to.083 with only six hits in 72 at bats. He appeared in his last major league game on September 29, 1977. Scrivener spent much of the 1977 season performing tasks such as warming up pitchers, throwing batting practice, and retrieving bats from the clubhouse. Scrivener later recalled: "I never was a great ball player, but I wasn't a bad employee. I tried to keep my nose clean. I didn't make waves. I didn't want to tick anybody off."

During his two years in the majors, Scrivener never played more than 19 games in a row and never made more than $28,000 a year. Reflecting on his salary, Scrivener recalled: "I was really happy to make that. I hear players today saying they can't live on $100,000 a year and I don't understand it. I could live two years on $28,000."

Scrivener was cut by the Tigers in lat March 1978. At the time, Scrivener said: "Sometimes I didn't think I was a big leaguer anyway." He added that "once you start going downhill, it's tough to start going uphill again."

Scrivener returned to the minor leagues for the 1978 season. In his final season of professional baseball, he appeared in 92 games for the Evansville Triplets, compiling a.262 batting average with 21 doubles, three triples, nine home runs, and 46 RBIs. In December 1978, Scrivener received a telephone call from Bill Lajoie advising that he had been released by the Tigers. Scrivener recalled: "My heart was pounding so hard I could hardly hear what he was saying. I had been with the organization for 11 years. I felt like part of the family. In two minutes it was all over."

Scrivener signed with the Toronto Blue Jays in 1979, but he injured his knee and never appeared in a game.

== Later years ==
In 1979, Scrivener returned to Detroit, selling napkins and toilet paper for Fort Howard Paper Co. He resigned in March 1980, refusing to accept a transfer to Illinois.
