= 1971 Major League Baseball draft =

Major League Baseball draft

Overview
- First selection: Danny Goodwin; Chicago White Sox
- First round selections: 24
- Hall of Famers: 3: OF Jim Rice; 3B George Brett; 3B Mike Schmidt

The 1971 Major League Baseball draft took place prior to the 1971 MLB season. The draft saw the Chicago White Sox select Danny Goodwin first overall.

== First round selections ==
= All-Star	= Baseball Hall of Famer

The following are the first round picks in the 1971 Major League Baseball draft.

Pick	Player	Team	Position	Hometown/School
1	* Danny Goodwin	Chicago White Sox	C	Peoria, Illinois
2	Jay Franklin	San Diego Padres	RHP	Vienna, Virginia
3	Tommy Bianco	Milwaukee Brewers	SS	Elmont, New York
4	* Condredge Holloway	Montreal Expos	SS	Huntsville, Alabama
5	Roy Branch	Kansas City Royals	RHP	St. Louis, Missouri
6	Roy Thomas	Philadelphia Phillies	RHP	Lompoc, California
7	Roger Quiroga	Washington Senators	RHP	Galveston, Texas
8	Ed Kurpiel	St. Louis Cardinals	1B	Hollis, New York
9	David Sloan	Cleveland Indians	RHP	Santa Clara, California
10	Taylor Duncan	Atlanta Braves	SS	Sacramento, California
11	Tom Veryzer	Detroit Tigers	SS	Islip, New York
12	Frank Tanana	California Angels	LHP	Detroit, Michigan
13	Neil Rasmussen	Houston Astros	SS	Arcadia, California
14	Rich Puig	New York Mets	2B	Tampa, Florida
15	Jim Rice	Boston Red Sox	OF	Anderson, South Carolina
16	Jeff Wehmeier	Chicago Cubs	RHP	Indianapolis, Indiana
17	William "Sugar Bear" Daniels	Oakland Athletics	RHP	Detroit, Michigan
18	Frank Riccelli	San Francisco Giants	LHP	Syracuse, New York
19	Terry Whitfield	New York Yankees	OF	Blythe, California
20	Rick Rhoden	Los Angeles Dodgers	RHP	Boynton Beach, Florida
21	Dale Soderholm	Minnesota Twins	SS	Miami, Florida
22	Craig Reynolds	Pittsburgh Pirates	SS	Houston, Texas
23	Randy Stein	Baltimore Orioles	RHP	Pomona, California
24	* Mike Miley	Cincinnati Reds	SS	Metairie, Louisiana (East Jefferson High School)

* Did not sign

== Other notable selections ==
= All-Star	= Baseball Hall of Famer

Round	Pick	Player	Team	Position
2	29	George Brett	Kansas City Royals	Shortstop
2	30	Mike Schmidt	Philadelphia Phillies	Shortstop
3	65	Ron Guidry	New York Yankees	Pitcher
4	78	Jerry Mumphrey	St. Louis Cardinals	Shortstop-Outfielder
7	143	Warren Cromartie	Chicago White Sox	Outfielder
7	151	Larry Andersen	Cleveland Indians	Pitcher
12	264	Mike Caldwell	San Diego Padres	Pitcher
15	346	Mike Flanagan*	Houston Astros	Pitcher
25	582	Roger Williams	Atlanta Braves	Outfielder
33	699	Steve Bartkowski*	Kansas City Royals	First Baseman
39	764	Joe Theismann*	Minnesota Twins	Shortstop
42	776	Keith Hernandez	St. Louis Cardinals	First Baseman

* Did not sign

== Background ==
The June 1971 draft was a productive one, even though none of its top ten choices yielded players who would have memorable major league careers. Selected in the regular phase were future Hall of Famers Jim Rice (Boston, 1st round), George Brett (Kansas City, 2nd round) and Mike Schmidt (Philadelphia, 2nd round).

Pitcher Mike Flanagan was selected in the 15th round of the June regular phase by Houston, but enrolled at the University of Massachusetts. One of the more interesting highlights of the June draft was that five quarterbacks were selected including future NFL stars Jim Plunkett, Archie Manning, Dan Pastorini, Steve Bartkowski, Joe Theismann as well as Condredge Holloway, who went on to have a career in the Canadian Football League, where he was awarded Most Outstanding Player while playing for the Toronto Argonauts.

Danny Goodwin, the nation's top pick, could not agree to terms with the White Sox and became the first top choice who did not sign a contract, instead choosing to attend Southern University in Baton Rouge. Four years later, Goodwin was again selected first overall, this time by the Angels.

Preceded by Mike Ivie	1st Overall Picks; Danny Goodwin	Succeeded by Dave Roberts
