= Billy Baldwin (baseball) =

American baseball player (1948–2011)

- Outfielder
- Born: June 9, 1948; Tazewell, Virginia, U.S.
- Died: June 28, 2011 (aged 63); Hudson, Ohio, U.S.
- Batted: Left Threw: Left

MLB debut
- July 29, 1975, for the Detroit Tigers

Last MLB appearance
- September 28, 1976, for the New York Mets

MLB statistics
- Batting average: .231
- Home runs: 5
- Runs batted in: 13
- Stats at Baseball Reference

Teams
- Detroit Tigers (1975); New York Mets (1976)

Robert Harvey Baldwin (June 9, 1948 – June 28, 2011) was an American Major League Baseball outfielder with the 1975 Detroit Tigers and the 1976 New York Mets. Listed at 6 ft 0 in (1.83 m), 175 lb., he batted and threw left-handed.

Baldwin was born in Tazewell, Virginia, and attended Southern University and A&M College in Baton Rouge, Louisiana on a scholarships for baseball, football and soccer. He signed with the Detroit Tigers as an undrafted free agent in 1972, and received his first call to the majors in 1975 when a thumb injury ended Tigers outfielder Mickey Stanley's season. He batted .221 with four home runs and eight runs batted in filling in at right field and center field.

He was traded with Mickey Lolich to the New York Mets for Rusty Staub and Bill Laxton on December 12, 1975. He spent the 1976 season with the Mets triple-A affiliate, the Tidewater Tides, and joined the Mets when rosters expanded that September. He batted .292 over nine games with the big league club.

Though he remained in the minors with the Mets through 1978, he would never see Major League action again. In a two-season career, Baldwin batted .231 (27-for-117) and five home runs, driving in 13 runs while scoring 12 times in 39 games. He also collected four doubles, one triple, and two stolen bases.

Baldwin died in Hudson, Ohio, in 2011.
