= Jack Pierce (baseball) =

American baseball player (1949–2012)

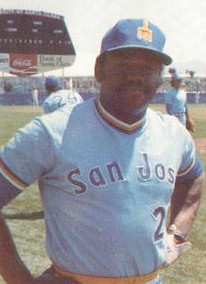
- Pierce in 1978
- First baseman
- Born: June 2, 1949; Laurel, Mississippi, U.S.
- Died: September 13, 2012 (aged 63); Monterrey, Mexico
- Batted: Left Threw: Left

Professional debut
- MLB: April 27, 1973, for the Atlanta Braves
- NPB: 1977, for the Nankai Hawks

Last appearance
- MLB: September 12, 1975, for the Detroit Tigers
- NPB: 1977, for the Nankai Hawks

MLB statistics
- Batting average: .211
- Home runs: 8
- Runs batted in: 22
- Stats at Baseball Reference

Teams
- Atlanta Braves (1973–1974); Detroit Tigers (1975); Nankai Hawks (1977)

Member of the Mexican Professional

Baseball Hall of Fame
- Induction: 2001

Lavern Jack Pierce (June 2, 1949 – September 13, 2012) was an American professional baseball player. Pierce played in parts of three seasons in the majors from 1973 until 1975 with the Atlanta Braves and Detroit Tigers. He also played with the Nankai Hawks in Japan in 1977. However, Pierce is better known for his exploits in minor league baseball. As of 1998, he ranked ninth all-time in minor league home runs with 395.

== Early years ==
Pierce was born in Laurel, Mississippi, in 1948. He attended San Jose High School in San Jose, California, and San Jose City College.

== Professional baseball ==
=== Minor leagues ===
Pierce was drafted by the Atlanta Braves in the third round of the 1969 Major League January Draft-Secondary Phase. He began his professional baseball career in 1970 with the Braves' rookie league team in Mission Valley, Idaho, the Magic Valley Cowboys, where he hit 16 doubles and nine home runs in 281 at bats.

In 1971, Pierce next played with the Single A Kinston Eagles of the Carolina League, where he compiled a .292 batting average, tied for the Carolina League lead with 29 doubles and ranked second with 20 home runs.

In 1972, he played with the Double A Savannah Braves of the Southern League where he hit .292 with 29 doubles, 23 home runs, and 103 RBIs.

=== Atlanta Braves ===
Pierce began the 1973 season with the Triple A Richmond Braves of the International League. After 11 games, he was batting .343 with two home runs and 11 RBIs when he was called up by the Atlanta Braves. Pierce made his major league debut on April 27 and tallied only one hit for a .050 batting average in his brief 11 game call-up before being sent back to Richmond.

In 1974, Pierce told the Braves he did not want to return to Richmond and was sent instead to the Charros de Jalisco of the Mexican Pacific League. He compiled a .306 batting average and ranked second in the Mexican League with 28 home runs, earning himself another call-up to Atlanta, where he again managed only a single hit in nine at bats for a .111 batting average.

=== Detroit Tigers ===
In early 1975, Pierce asked the Braves to trade him. He was traded in March to the Detroit Tigers in exchange for Reggie Sanders. Pierce began the 1975 season with Detroit's Double A Evansville Triplets of the American Association, where he hit .282 with nine home runs and 25 RBIs in 36 games.

Detroit's first baseman Nate Colbert struggled early in the 1975 season, and Pierce was called up at the end of May. Pierce said at the time: "I think I'm as good a first baseman as most anyone. But I've never had a chance to prove it." On June 15, 1975, the Tigers sold Colbert to the Montreal Expos, and Pierce became the team's starting first baseman. He appeared in 53 games for the 1975 Tigers, 47 of them as the Tigers' starting first baseman. In his short time with the Tigers, he committed 13 errors at first base, ranking third among American League first basemen for the entire 1975 season. At the plate, he hit .235 with eight home runs in 170 at bats.

In early August 1975, Pierce lost the job as Detroit's starting first baseman to Danny Meyer. Pierce appeared in his last major league game on September 12. In late September, Pierce acknowledge that his fielding had been subpar: "I know I made some mistakes in the field . . . Dumb mistakes . . . mistakes that I never made before in my life. I messed up -- I know that."

=== Minor leagues, Mexico and Japan ===
Pierce returned to Mexico, where he homered 36 times, winning the first of three homer crowns. He hit .331/~.410/.599 for Puebla in 1976 and also topped the Liga with 109 RBI.

The next season, Pierce once again found himself in another country, this time Japan, where he signed with the Nankai Hawks for the 1977 season. He hit .227/.302/.399 with 13 homers in 291 at-bats. Right before opening day the next year, the Hawks let Pierce go.

Pierce returned to America in 1978, signing a minor league contract with the Seattle Mariners. In 1978, he played for the San Jose Missions, and in 1979 for the Spokane Indians, both Triple-A farm clubs of the Mariners, without getting to the majors.

Pierce returned to his old haunts in Mexico, but struggled in his third trip to the Liga, hitting just .198 in 32 games. Jack returned to form somewhat in 1980; while his average was low and he slugged under .500, he did hit a league-best 17 homers in the strike-shortened season, taking his second home run crown.

In 1984 the Mexican League began using the lively Commando ball and Pierce took advantage better than most – he raised his average 118 points to .364 with an OBP around .438 and a slugging of .659. He was second to Antonio Lora in RBI (117) and third in homers. A year later he cranked out 40 in his second season for the Bravos de León, with 104 runs and 118 RBI, slugging .620. He was third in RBI and second in homers, one behind league leader Andrés Mora.

1986 saw Pierce set a Mexican League record with 54 home runs for the Braves. The old mark had been 46 by Héctor Espino – in addition to Pierce, Nick Castaneda (53) and Willie Aikens (46) at least matched the old record. Pierce hit .381, scored 111, drove in 148, slugged .783 and had an OBP around .464. Pierce also spent some time as Leon's player-manager that year.

After slipping to .277/~.372/.516 with 24 homers in 1987, Pierce retired. As of 2000, his 294 homers in the Liga were 8th in league history, the best by a U.S. native. Pierce had hit .300 and slugged .553 in his 11 years in Mexico.

== Later years ==
Pierce was elected to the Mexican Professional Baseball Hall of Fame in 2001. He was the batting coach of the Sultanes de Monterrey team.

Pierce died from a pulmonary embolism in Monterrey, Mexico at the age of 64.
