= Danny Goodwin =

American baseball player (born 1953)

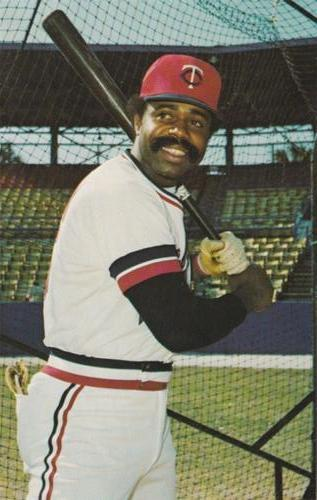
- Designated hitter / First baseman
- Born: September 2, 1953 (age 72); St. Louis, Missouri, U.S.
- Batted: Left Threw: Right

Professional debut
- MLB: September 3, 1975, for the California Angels
- NPB: April 4, 1986, for the Nankai Hawks

Last appearance
- MLB: July 7, 1982, for the Oakland Athletics
- NPB: October 8, 1986, for the Nankai Hawks

MLB statistics
- Batting average: .236
- Home runs: 13
- Runs batted in: 81

NPB statistics
- Batting average: .231
- Home runs: 8
- Runs batted in: 26
- Stats at Baseball Reference

Teams
- California Angels (1975, 1977–1978); Minnesota Twins (1979–1981); Oakland Athletics (1982); Nankai Hawks (1986)
Medals
Men's baseball
Representing United States
Baseball World Cup
Gold medal – first place	1973 Central America	Team

Danny Kay Goodwin (born September 2, 1953) is an American former professional baseball player. He played in Major League Baseball (MLB) as a first baseman and designated hitter from 1975 to 1982. He also played in the Nippon Professional Baseball league with the Nankai Hawks in 1986. Goodwin is the only baseball player to be drafted first overall in the Major League draft in two separate drafts.

== 1971 and 1975 draft first overall pick ==
Goodwin was originally drafted first overall by the Chicago White Sox in the 1971 Major League Baseball draft as a catcher straight out of Peoria High School. He was the initial first overall pick in MLB history not to sign with the team that selected him when he chose to accept a scholarship from Southern University instead because of his desire for a college education and the White Sox offering a lower-than-anticipated signing bonus estimated as between $50,000 and $80,000.

He batted .394 with twenty home runs and 166 runs batted in for SUBR. In 1973, he played collegiate summer baseball with the Cotuit Kettleers of the Cape Cod Baseball League and was named a league all-star. He was a three-time All-America, at the NAIA level his sophomore and junior years, and at the NCAA level his senior year, and was named the Sporting News 1975 College Player of the Year. Shortly afterwards, the California Angels selected him first overall pick in the 1975 Major League Baseball draft and signed him for a major league record $150,000.

== California Angels ==
Eager to get their top prospect to the majors as quickly as possible, the Angels assigned Goodwin to the double-A El Paso Diablos in the Texas League upon his signing. Joining El Paso midway through the 1975 season, Goodwin batted .275 with two home runs and 18 RBIs. He was called up to California in September and had just one hit (off the Kansas City Royals' Steve Busby) in ten at bats.

Goodwin split 1976 between El Paso and the California League Salinas Angels. He batted over .300 for both clubs, while hitting eight home runs and driving in 69. Playing triple-A ball for the first time in his career in 1977, Goodwin batted .305 with ten home runs & 66 RBIs in half a season with the Salt Lake City Gulls to earn a call back up to the majors in mid-July. On July 29, Goodwin hit his first career home run off Hall of Famer Fergie Jenkins. He would end the season with a .209 batting average, eight RBIs and one home run.

Goodwin returned to the El Paso Diablos for the 1978 season where he excelled, producing an impressive .360 batting average along with 25 home runs and 89 RBIs in 101 games. He was called up to the major leagues that August, and seemed to finally display the promise that made him the first overall pick in two drafts. He batted .283 with two home runs and ten RBIs in August. After the season, he and first baseman Ron Jackson were traded to the Minnesota Twins for outfielder Dan Ford. Though Goodwin was a catcher in high school and college, he was only ever used as a designated hitter or pinch hitter by the Angels, and never saw any on the field action.

== Minnesota Twins ==
Goodwin, who was never a very good fielding catcher, was converted into a first baseman by the Twins (though used primarily as a DH his first two seasons in Minnesota). His first season with the Twins stands as his best major league season. After once again starting the season in triple-A, Goodwin joined the Twins midway through the 1979 season. In half a season, Goodwin batted .289 with five home runs and 27 RBIs, all career highs.

Though Goodwin spent a full season in the majors for the first time in his career in 1980, he did not see much playing time. Appearing in just 55 games, he batted .200 with one home run and eleven RBIs. Likewise, he appeared in 59 games in 1981 and batted just .225. He was released after the season.

== Oakland A's ==
Goodwin signed with the Oakland Athletics and spent the 1982 season going back and forth between them and the triple-A Tacoma Tigers. While putting together an exceptional season for Tacoma (.301 avg., 11 home runs, 58 RBIs), Goodwin batted just .212 with two home runs and eight RBIs for the A's. He spent the next two seasons at Tacoma, where he batted .294 with 32 home runs and 147 RBIs, but never returned to the majors. His last professional season was with the Nankai Hawks of Nippon Professional Baseball in 1986.

== Career statistics ==
Games	PA	AB	Runs	Hits	2B	3B	HR	RBI	SB	BB	HBP	SO	Avg.	OBP	Slg.	Fld%
252	707	636	72	150	32	8	13	81	3	61	0	137	.236	.301	.373	.994

Once his playing days ended, Goodwin served as the Atlanta Braves' director of community relations, and later, as director of the Braves’ foundation, developing programs for underprivileged children in the city. In 2011, Goodwin became the first player from a historically black university to be inducted into the National College Baseball Hall of Fame. While at SUBR, Goodwin also earned a degree in premed zoology.
