= Tom Brookens =

American baseball player and coach (born 1953)

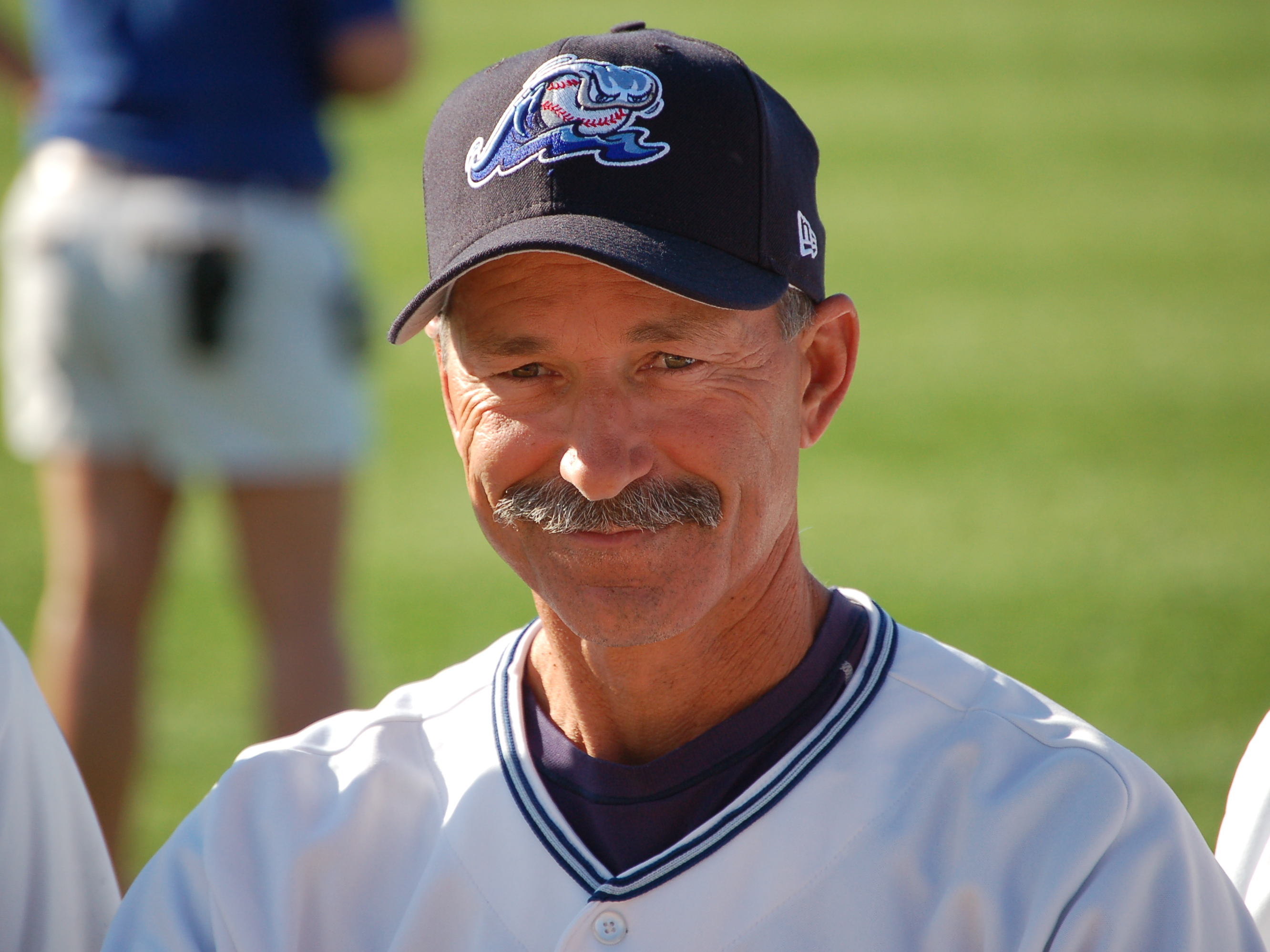
- Third baseman
- Born: August 10, 1953 (age 72); Chambersburg, Pennsylvania, U.S.
- Batted: Right Threw: Right

MLB debut
- July 10, 1979, for the Detroit Tigers

Last MLB appearance
- September 30, 1990, for the Cleveland Indians

MLB statistics
- Batting average: .246
- Home runs: 71
- Runs batted in: 431
- Stats at Baseball Reference

Teams
- As player: Detroit Tigers (1979–1988); New York Yankees (1989); Cleveland Indians (1990); As coach: Detroit Tigers (2010–2013)

Career highlights and awards
- World Series champion (1984)
Medals
Men's baseball
Representing United States
World Baseball Classic
Gold medal – first place	2017 Los Angeles	Team

Thomas Dale Brookens (born August 10, 1953) is an American former professional baseball third baseman. He played for the Detroit Tigers, New York Yankees and Cleveland Indians of the Major League Baseball (MLB). Brookens was on the Tigers' coaching staff from 2009 to 2013, serving as first base coach and later third base coach. He was replaced as third base coach prior to the 2014 season by Dave Clark.

== Playing career ==
On January 9, 1975, Brookens was drafted by the Detroit Tigers in the first round (fourth pick overall) of the 1975 MLB draft. In 12 MLB seasons, Brookens played 1,065 games at third base, 162 games at second base, and 119 games at shortstop. Tigers radio announcer Ernie Harwell nicknamed Brookens "the Pennsylvania Poker", a play on the song "Pennsylvania Polka".

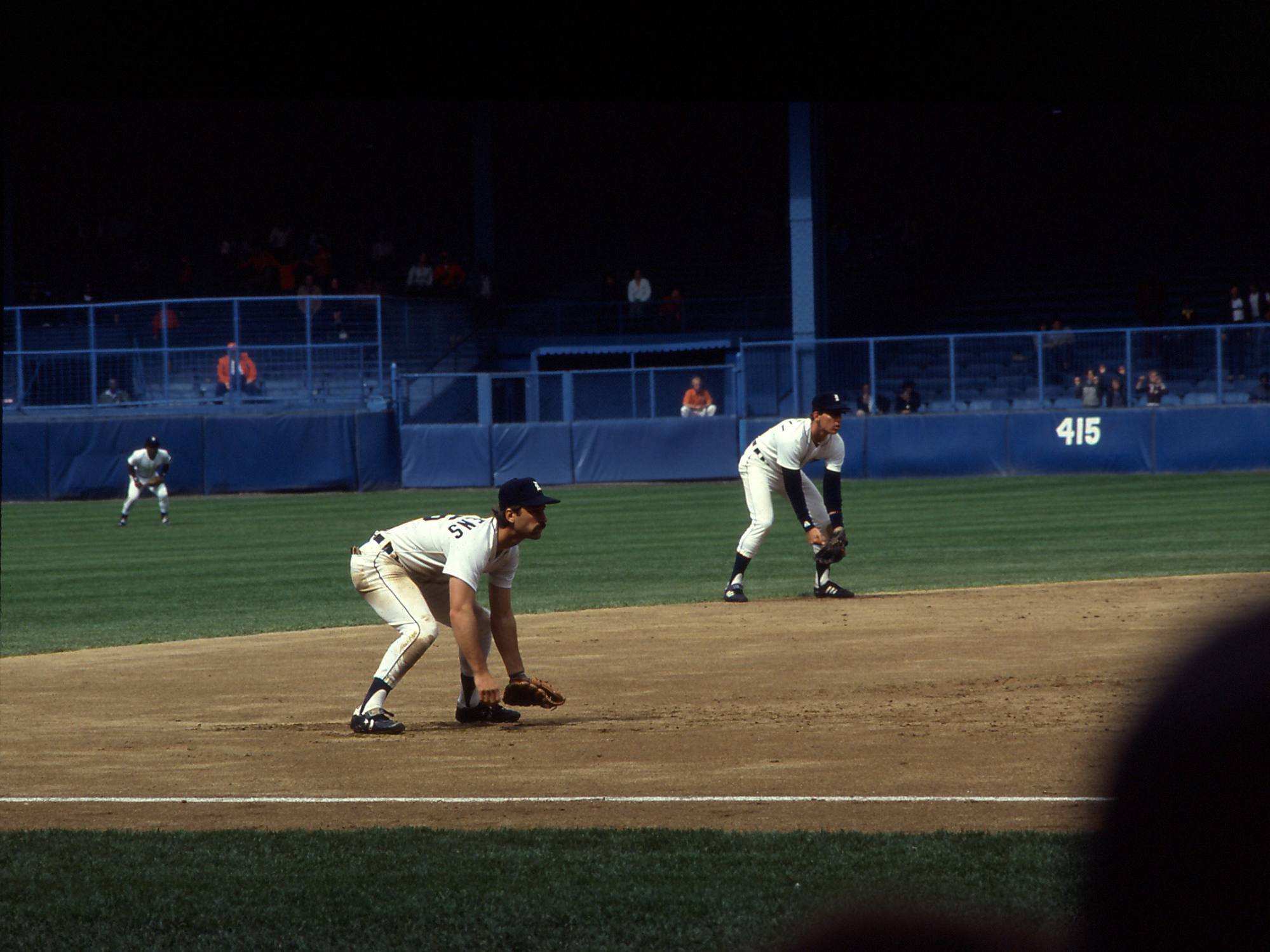
Brookens (left) playing third base for Detroit

Brookens batted .246 in his 12-year career, with 71 home runs and 431 runs batted in (RBIs) in 1,336 games. His range factor (putouts and assists per game) was well above league average. He did lead American League (AL) third basemen in errors twice, in 1980 and 1985, but that was largely because he was getting to so many more grounders than other fielders; his range factor, which measures the number of plays a fielder makes, was consistently above league average. Brookens also has the dubious honor of sharing (with 21 others) the AL record for the most errors in a game by a third baseman, four, on September 6, 1980.

Traditionally an infielder, Brookens found himself behind the plate in a game against the Texas Rangers on July 20, 1985. With regular catcher Lance Parrish hurt and Bob Melvin and Marty Castillo removed from the game in favor of pinch-hitters, Brookens (who had never caught a pro game before, even in the minors) filled the role and wound up catching five innings (11th through the 15th) before Detroit finally won the game.

On August 20, 1980, Brookens went 5-for-5 with a triple and a home run, and also started a triple play in an 8–6 win over the Milwaukee Brewers.

On September 18, 1984, Brookens hit an eighth inning solo home run into the left field seats at Tiger Stadium off of Milwaukee Brewers lefty Mike Caldwell on a 3-2 fastball. This was the clinching game leading the Tigers toward their 1984 World Championship.

Besides, Brookens played winter baseball with the Leones del Caracas club of the Venezuelan League during the 1977–1979 seasons.

He won a World Series ring with the Tigers in 1984.

== As a manager ==
Brookens in 2005 and 2006 was the manager of the Class A New York–Penn League Oneonta Tigers in the Detroit Tigers minor league system. In 2007, Brookens was hired to lead the West Michigan Whitecaps which won the championship of the Class A – Midwest League that year. After winning a championship with the Whitecaps, the Tigers promoted Brookens again in 2008, this time to the Erie SeaWolves, their Class AA – Eastern League affiliate.

== As a coach ==
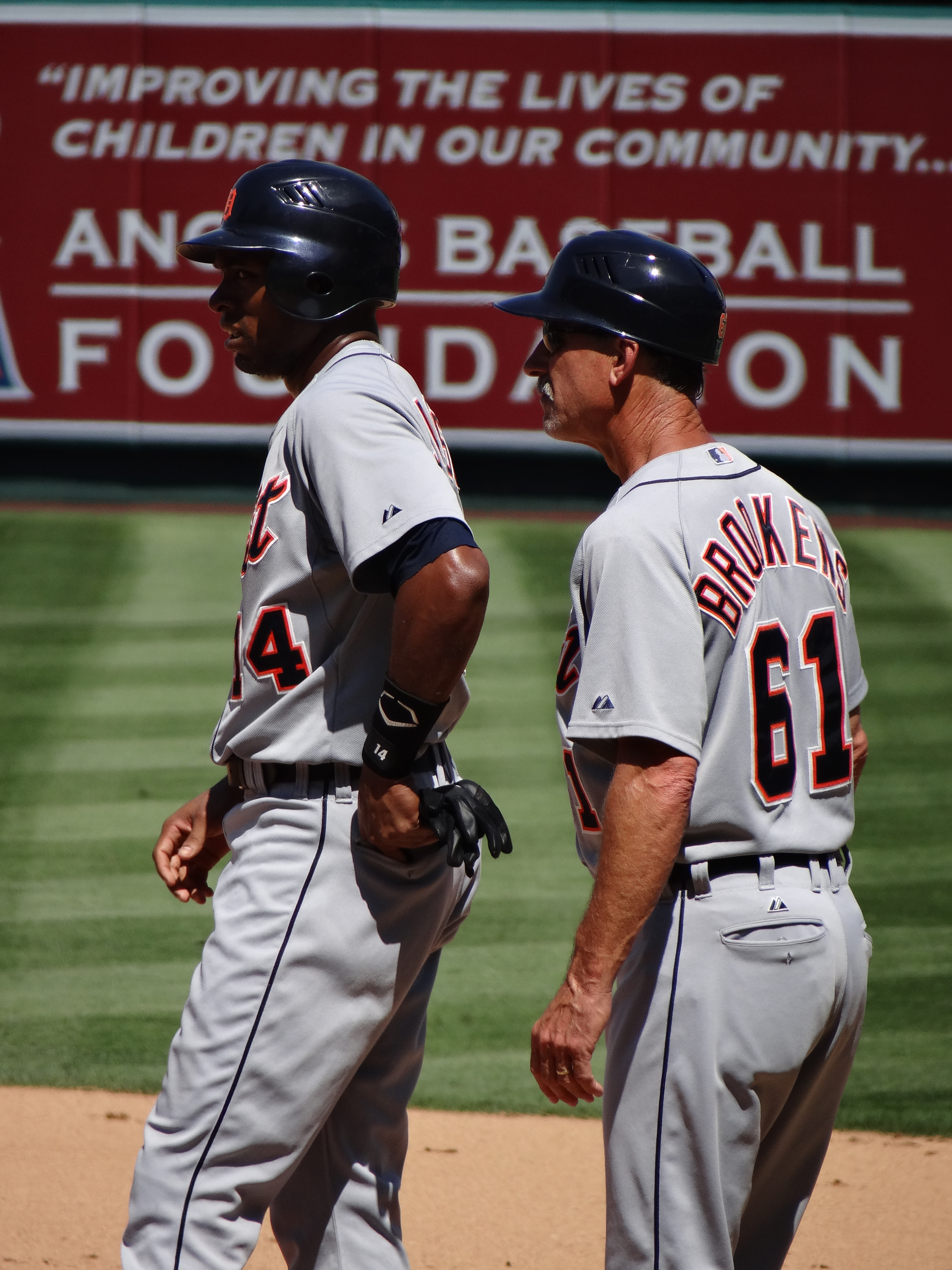
Austin Jackson and Brookens, 2012

On November 9, 2009, the Tigers hired Brookens as their new first base coach. The move reunited Brookens with Tigers manager Jim Leyland, who had managed Brookens in the minor leagues in the 1970s. In 2013, Brookens was moved across the diamond to serve as the Tigers third base coach; he was mentioned as a possible future manager of the club when Leyland retired, but former catcher Brad Ausmus was named Leyland's replacement.

Leyland selected Brookens to serve as bench coach for Team USA during the 2017 World Baseball Classic, coaching on a staff that included pitching coach Jeff Jones (who coached alongside Brookens with the Tigers from 2009 to 2013) and first base coach Alan Trammell, as teammate of Brookens from 1979 to 1988.

== Family ==
Brookens' twin brother Tim was also drafted in 1975 by the Texas Rangers; he was later traded to the Tigers organization, but never made the majors. In spring training, Tim and Tom would sometimes switch identities, even suiting up in each other's uniforms; Tim is believed to have played at least one exhibition game disguised as Tom. Their cousin, Ike Brookens, pitched for the Tigers in 1975, while Ike's son Casey Brookens also played in the minors in the 1990s before retiring to become a high school coach in Pennsylvania.
