= Tom Makowski =

American baseball player (born 1950)

- Pitcher
- Born: December 22, 1950 (age 75); Buffalo, New York, U.S.
- Batted: Right Threw: Left

MLB debut
- May 1, 1975, for the Detroit Tigers

Last MLB appearance
- May 23, 1975, for the Detroit Tigers

MLB statistics
- Win–loss record: 0–0
- Earned run average: 4.82
- Strikeouts: 3
- Stats at Baseball Reference

Teams
- Detroit Tigers (1975)

Thomas Anthony Makowski (born December 22, 1950) is an American former pitcher in Major League Baseball who played for the Detroit Tigers in its 1975 season.

Makowski also played for the New York Mets in 1977 although he did not appear in an official regular season game. His only appearance with the club came in the exhibition Mayor's Trophy Game against the New York Yankees on June 23, getting credit for a win in a 6-4 decision at Shea Stadium.
