= John Young (first baseman) =

American baseball player (1949–2016)

- First baseman
- Born: February 9, 1949; Los Angeles, California, U.S.
- Died: May 8, 2016 (aged 67); Los Angeles, California, U.S.
- Batted: Left Threw: Left

MLB debut
- September 9, 1971, for the Detroit Tigers

Last MLB appearance
- September 25, 1971, for the Detroit Tigers

MLB statistics
- Batting average: .500
- Home runs: 0
- Runs batted in: 1
- Stats at Baseball Reference

Teams
- Detroit Tigers (1971)

John Thomas Young (February 9, 1949 – May 8, 2016) was an American professional baseball player. He also scouted and worked in the front office. Young played in Major League Baseball for the Detroit Tigers in 1971. He founded Reviving Baseball in Inner Cities (RBI), a youth baseball program aimed at increasing participation among African Americans in baseball.

== Career ==
The Cincinnati Reds drafted Young in the 27th round of the 1967 Major League Baseball (MLB) draft. Rather than sign with the Reds, Young chose to enroll at Chapman College, where he played for the school's baseball team. He was drafted again in the first round, with the 16th overall selection, of the 1969 MLB draft by the Detroit Tigers, at which time he signed. He played two games in the major leagues at first base for the Detroit Tigers in 1971, going 2-for-4 with a double and a run batted in. After the 1974 season, the Tigers traded Young to the St. Louis Cardinals for Ike Brookens.

Young rejoined the Tigers as a minor league instructor in 1978, and became a scout for the Tigers in 1979. He was named their director of scouting in 1981. He also scouted for the San Diego Padres, Texas Rangers, and Florida Marlins and was special assistant to the general manager for the Chicago Cubs.

=== Reviving Baseball in Inner Cities ===
While scouting, Young discovered that there were few African American players chosen in the 1986 MLB draft. After presenting his findings to Orioles' general manager Roland Hemond and MLB Commissioner Peter Ueberroth, Ueberroth contacted Tom Bradley, the mayor of Los Angeles, who agreed to fund a youth baseball program in Los Angeles, providing $50,000. Young also received funding from the Amateur Athletic Union.

Young organized 12 teams consisting of 180 13- and 14-year-olds for Reviving Baseball in Inner Cities (RBI) in 1989. He obtained help from African American players, including Darryl Strawberry and Eric Davis, who are from Southern California. MLB assumed operation of the RBI program in 1991.

== Personal life ==
Young was born in Los Angeles, and graduated from Mount Carmel High School. Young and his wife, Sheryl, had three children, Dorian, Jon and Tori. Young had diabetes, and was admitted into a Los Angeles-area hospital to amputate his leg on May 5, 2016. He died in the hospital on May 8. He was interred at Holy Cross Cemetery in Culver City.
