= Reviving Baseball in Inner Cities =

Youth baseball organization

- Formation: 1989
- Founder: John Young
- Parent organization: Major League Baseball
- Budget: US$30,000,000
- Website: Reviving Baseball in Inner Cities

Reviving Baseball in Inner Cities (RBI), known for sponsorship purposes as Nike RBI is a youth baseball program operated by Major League Baseball. This youth initiative is designed to provide young people from underserved and diverse communities the opportunity to play baseball and softball. The program was created by John Young in 1989 in Los Angeles, and now serves more than 200 communities. In 2023, Nike, Inc. became the presenting sponsor.

== Background ==
Working as a scout for the Detroit Tigers of Major League Baseball (MLB) following his playing career, John Young noticed a lack of African American prospects. While working for the Baltimore Orioles, he surveyed prospects selected in the 1986 MLB draft, many of whom attended four-year colleges, and then noticed that among California colleges, 4% of players were African American and less than 3% were Hispanic. He presented his findings to Orioles' general manager Roland Hemond and MLB Commissioner Peter Ueberroth. Ueberroth contacted Tom Bradley, the mayor of Los Angeles, who agreed to fund a youth baseball program in Los Angeles, providing $50,000. Young also received funding from the Amateur Athletic Union.

Young, with the Professional Baseball Scouts of Southern California, organized 12 teams of 180 13- and 14-year-olds in 1989, the first year of the RBI program. Darryl Strawberry and Eric Davis, African American baseball players from Southern California, devoted time and money to help the program.

MLB took over operation of the RBI program in 1991. By 1992, the RBI program expanded to Harlem, St. Louis, and Kansas City. Leonard S. Coleman, Jr., the former president of the National League, took over operation in the program in 1994 and forged a working alliance with the Boys and Girls Clubs of America to help grow the RBI program.

The RBI program has received support from KPMG, the Cal Ripken, Sr. Foundation, Louisville Slugger, New Balance, Rawlings, Wilson Sporting Goods, and Outdoor Cap.

In April 2023, MLB announced that Nike had become the presenting sponsor for RBI.

== Structure ==
Teams compete in three divisions: the Junior Boys division (13 to 15 years of age), the Senior Boys division (16 to 18 years of age), and Girls Softball (up to 18 years of age). League schedules run from May through August. Teams compete in regional tournaments in order to compete in the RBI World Series, which began in 1993. The RBI World Series is aired on the MLB Network and can be streamed on MLB.com, starting in 2010.

RBI operates programs in more than 200 cities, with over 100,000 participants annually. Programs run in the United States, Canada, the Caribbean, and South America. MLB provides college scholarships to RBI participants. A Junior RBI program serves children from the ages of 6 through 12, which was launched in 2009.

== Results ==
Rachel Robinson, widow of Jackie Robinson, has praised the efforts of the RBI program to reach out to African American youth. Alumni of the RBI program include major leaguers CC Sabathia, Jimmy Rollins, Coco Crisp, James Loney, Carl Crawford, B. J. Upton, Justin Upton, Julio Borbon, Efren Navarro, Ricky Romero, Yovani Gallardo, Chris Young, J. P. Crawford, Dominic Smith, and James McDonald, as well as MLB draftees Brice Matthews and Jurrangelo Cijntje.

== See also ==
- Civil Rights Game
- Major League Baseball Urban Youth Academy
