= Art James (baseball) =

American baseball player (born 1952)

- Outfielder
- Born: August 2, 1952 (age 73); Detroit, Michigan
- Batted: Left Threw: Left

MLB debut
- April 10, 1975, for the Detroit Tigers

Last MLB appearance
- August 4, 1975, for the Detroit Tigers

MLB statistics
- Batting average: .225
- Home runs: 0
- Runs batted in: 1
- Stats at Baseball Reference

Teams
- Detroit Tigers (1975)

Arthur James (born August 2, 1952) is former Major League Baseball outfielder who played for the Detroit Tigers in 1975.
