= Reggie Sanders (first baseman) =

American baseball player (1949–2002)

- First baseman
- Born: September 9, 1949; Birmingham, Alabama, U.S.
- Died: January 27, 2002 (aged 52); Los Angeles, California, U.S.
- Batted: Right Threw: Right

MLB debut
- September 1, 1974, for the Detroit Tigers

Last MLB appearance
- October 2, 1974, for the Detroit Tigers

MLB statistics
- Batting average: .273
- Home runs: 3
- Runs batted in: 10
- Stats at Baseball Reference

Teams
- Detroit Tigers (1974)

Reginald Jerome Sanders (September 9, 1949 – January 27, 2002), was an American Major League Baseball player. He played 26 games, mostly at first base, for the Detroit Tigers in 1974. He hit a home run (off Catfish Hunter) in his first major league at bat.

Sanders was traded from the Oakland Athletics to the Tigers for Mike Kilkenny and cash on May 9, 1972. He was dealt from the Tigers to the Atlanta Braves for Jack Pierce in an exchange of minor-league first basemen on March 30, 1975. He was selected by the Chicago White Sox from the Braves in the Rule 5 draft on December 5, 1977.

Sanders died on January 27, 2002.

== See also ==
List of Major League Baseball players with a home run in their first major league at bat
