= Les Filkins =

American baseball player

- Outfielder
- Born: September 14, 1956 (age 69); Chicago, Illinois, U.S.
- Bats: Left Throws: Left

NPB statistics
- Batting average: .268
- Home runs: 2
- Runs batted in: 7
- Stats at Baseball Reference

Teams
- Hiroshima Toyo Carp (1983)

Leslie William Filkins, Jr. (born September 14, 1956) is an American former professional baseball outfielder who played professionally from 1975 to 1983. Filkins was drafted by the Detroit Tigers with the third pick of the 1975 Major League Baseball draft. He played in Detroit's minor league system from 1975 until 1982. He made it as far as Triple A. He batted .255 in his 8 years in the minors, with 60 home runs and 328 runs batted in. In 1983, Filkins played for the Hiroshima Toyo Carp in the Central League.
