= Dan Meyer (first baseman) =

American baseball player (born 1952)

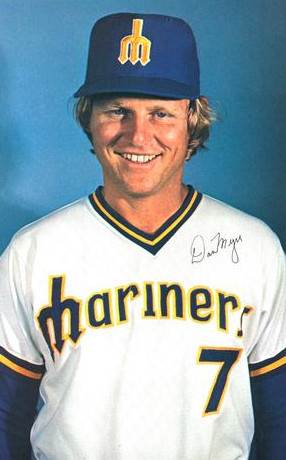
- Meyer in 1978
- First baseman / Left fielder / Third baseman
- Born: August 3, 1952 (age 74); Hamilton, Ohio, U.S.
- Batted: Left Threw: Right

MLB debut
- September 14, 1974, for the Detroit Tigers

Last MLB appearance
- May 24, 1985, for the Oakland Athletics

MLB statistics
- Batting average: .253
- Home runs: 86
- Runs batted in: 459
- Stats at Baseball Reference

Teams
- Detroit Tigers (1974–1976); Seattle Mariners (1977–1981); Oakland Athletics (1982–1985)

Daniel Thomas Meyer (born August 3, 1952) is an American former professional baseball player whose career spanned 17 seasons, 12 of which were played in Major League Baseball (MLB) with the Detroit Tigers (1974–76), Seattle Mariners (1977–81), and Oakland Athletics (1982–85). Meyer primarily played first base but also played left field, third base, and right field. He batted left-handed and threw right-handed. During his playing career, Meyer was listed at 5 feet 11 inches (180 cm) and weighed 180 pounds (82 kg).

After playing college baseball for the Arizona Wildcats and Santa Ana College, Meyer was drafted by Detroit during the 1972 MLB draft. He made his major league debut in 1974. The Mariners selected him in the 1976 expansion draft. He was the first Seattle player to win the American League Player of the Week and Player of the Month awards and was the nascent franchise's leader with 64 home runs through 1984. His 21-game hitting streak in 1979 was the franchise record until 1997. The Mariners traded him to Oakland in late 1981.

== Amateur career ==
Meyer attended Mater Dei High School in Santa Ana, California. In 1970, Meyer was inducted into the school's baseball hall of fame. Meyer spent one year (1971) at the University of Arizona, but left the school after being assigned to the freshman team his first season. In 1972, Meyer enrolled in Santa Ana College, where he played second base.

== Professional career ==
=== Detroit Tigers ===
The Detroit Tigers selected Meyer in the fourth round of the 1972 MLB draft. He received a $12,500 signing bonus, equivalent to $96,200 in 2025. That year, at the age of 19, Meyer made his professional baseball debut with the Bristol Tigers of the rookie-level Appalachian League, where he batted .396 with 93 hits, 11 doubles, six triples, and 14 home runs in 65 games played. On defense, he played second and third base. He led the league in batting average, hits, and total bases (158) that season. During his second professional season in 1973, Meyer was assigned to the Lakeland Tigers of the Class-A Florida State League. With Lakeland, he batted .241 with 114 hits, 17 doubles, six triples, and 10 home runs in 133 games played. In the field, Meyer only played second base. It would later prove to be his last professional season playing at that position.

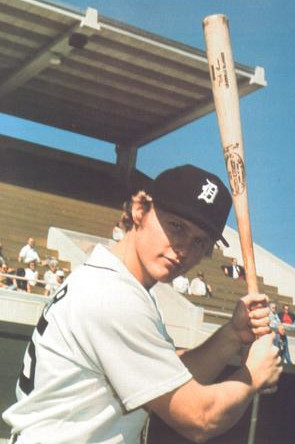
Meyer with the Detroit Tigers, c. 1975.

Meyer began the 1974 season in the minor leagues with the Evansville Triplets of the Triple-A American Association. In 129 games with the Triplets, he batted .302 with 75 runs scored, 146 hits, 26 doubles, seven triples, nine home runs, 57 runs batted in (RBI), and 10 stolen bases. He was an American Association All-Star. Meyer was a September call-up for Detroit that year. On September 14, he made his MLB debut with the Tigers in a game against the New York Yankees, where in one at bat he went hitless. He registered his first hit on September 20, in a game against the Milwaukee Brewers. Meyer then hit two home runs in that game, the first coming in the third inning off of Brewers' starter Bill Champion, and the second coming off of reliever Bill Travers in the seventh inning. In 13 games with Detroit that year, Meyer batted .200 with five runs scored, 10 hits, one double, one triple, three home runs, seven RBIs, and one stolen base. All of his 12 defensive games were played in left field.

In 1975, Meyer played his first full season in the major leagues. He played left field and first base in the field. During the fifth inning of a game against the Boston Red Sox on April 25, Meyer hit a home run to break up Luis Tiant's perfect game bid. One day after hitting the game-winning home run for the Tigers against the Brewers on May 7, Meyer committed a throwing error that allowed the decisive Texas Rangers' run to score. He batted .236 with 56 runs scored, 17 doubles, three triples, eight home runs, 47 RBIs, and eight stolen bases in 122 games in 1975. Meyer led the American League (AL) that year in plate appearances per strikeout with 18.8, a ratio that was four plate appearances more than second-place Mickey Rivers.

Meyer played 105 games in 1976 for the Tigers. He batted .252 with 37 runs scored, 74 hits, eight doubles, four triples, two home runs, 16 RBIs, and 10 stolen bases. His batting average his highest with Detroit, though he had fewer at-bats (470 in 1975, 294 in 1976). During the season, Meyer played 47 games in left field, 19 at first base, and one as the designated hitter (DH).

=== Seattle Mariners ===
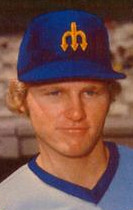
Meyer with the Seattle Mariners in 1977.

The Seattle Mariners selected Meyer with the ninth overall pick in the 1976 MLB expansion draft. He played first base in the franchise's first game in 1977. On May 3, he reached base twice via catcher's interference, tied for the most all-time in one MLB game. On June 9, in a game against the Minnesota Twins, Meyer hit two home runs. In August, he was named the AL Player of the Week after battting .526 with three stolen bases. In the first season of the Mariners, Meyer batted .273 with 75 runs scored, 159 hits, 24 doubles, four triples, 22 home runs, 90 RBIs, and 11 stolen bases in 159 games played. He led the AL with 159 defensive games at first base. He led Seattle in hits and RBIs. Meyer also set multiple career highs in 1977, including games played, plate appearances (639), at bats (582), runs scored, hits, home runs, RBIs, walks (43), strikeouts (51), on-base percentage (.320), and total bases (257).

In 1978, Meyer's offensive statistics declined. In 123 games, he batted .227 with 38 runs scored, 101 hits, 18 doubles, one triple, eight home runs, 56 RBIs, and seven stolen bases. Defensively, he played 121 games at first base and two games in left field. He missed a month of the season with pulled rib muscles.

Meyer was moved back to third base during the 1979 season, while also playing limited time at left field and first base. In June, while Meyer was having success at the plate, he attributed it to switching positions. He won the AL Player of the Month Award for June, after having a 21-game hitting streak. He was the first Mariner player to win the award. His hitting streak, matched by Richie Zisk in 1982, remained a franchise record until Joey Cora surpassed it in 1997. On the season, Meyer batted .278 with 72 runs scored, 146 hits, 21 doubles, seven triples, 20 home runs, 74 RBIs, and 11 stolen bases in 144 games played. He ranked third in the AL in at bats per strikeout.

Meyer started 1980 strong, with a .410 batting average after 10 games and .300 batting average through late July, but he batted .230 the rest of the season. On the whole, he batted .275 with 56 runs scored, 146 hits, 25 doubles, six triples, 11 home runs, 71 RBIs, and eight stolen bases in 146 games. Meyer spent his final season as a Mariners player in 1981, batting .262 with 26 runs scored, 66 hits, 10 doubles, one triple, three home runs, and 22 RBIs in 83 games played. Meyer saw his playing time decrease that season due to strained abdominal muscles, which had him on the disabled list from the start of the season to April 15.

Meyer was the nascent franchise's all-time home run leader, with 64 after five seasons. Dave Henderson surpassed him in 1985. Meyer was a popular player, featured in a Mariners' television commercial that called him "Disco Danny". However, he has one of the lowest wins above replacement totals all-time among Mariners players, according to FanGraphs.

=== Oakland Athletics ===
In December 1981, Seattle traded Meyer to the Oakland Athletics for reliever Rich Bordi. In his first season with the Athletics, Meyer batted .240 with 28 runs scored, 92 hits, 17 doubles, three triples, eight home runs, and 59 RBIs in 120 games. That year, he was primarily used as a first baseman but did see limited time in right field and left field. He was also the DH in 38 games. During the 1983 season, Meyer batted .189 with runs scored, 32 hits, nine doubles, one home run, and 13 RBIs in 69 games played.

In 1984, Meyer started the season in the minor leagues for the first time in ten years. With the Tacoma Tigers of the Triple-A Pacific Coast League, he batted .293 with 134 hits, 19 doubles, two triples, and seven home runs in 124 games played. Meyer was called back up to the majors in September. With the Athletics, he batted .318 with one run scored, seven hits, three doubles, one triple, and four RBIs in 20 games. After the season, he elected free agency.

On January 15, 1985, Meyer re-signed with the Athletics. With Oakland that year, he went hitless in 12 at-bats. He was released by the team on May 26.

=== Later career ===
For the rest of the 1985 season, Meyer played with the Nashville Sounds, the Triple-A affiliate of the Tigers, batting .225 with 13 doubles, one triple, and one home run in 51 games.

Meyer played for the Diablos Rojos del México in the Mexican Baseball League for part of the 1986 season. In 1987, he played three games with the Class-A San Jose Bees of the California League. He played in the inaugural season of the Senior Professional Baseball Association in 1989–1990 for the Bradenton Explorers.

== Personal life ==
Meyer has been married three times. He married his former high school sweetheart in 1972. The couple had one child and divorced in 1978. He married his second wife after the 1978 MLB season. They had three children and divorced in 1989. He married his third wife in 2013.

In 1986, Meyer bought and operated a restaurant in San Ramon, California, later sold in 1989. After his playing career, he worked for AT&T in Pleasanton, California. He later had a produce business.
