= Ike Brookens =

American baseball player (born 1949)

- Pitcher
- Born: January 3, 1949 (age 77); Chambersburg, Pennsylvania, U.S.
- Batted: Right Threw: Right

MLB debut
- June 17, 1975, for the Detroit Tigers

Last MLB appearance
- June 25, 1975, for the Detroit Tigers

MLB statistics
- Win–loss record: 0–0
- Earned run average: 5.23
- Strikeouts: 8
- Stats at Baseball Reference

Teams
- Detroit Tigers (1975)

Edward Dwain "Ike" Brookens (born January 3, 1949) is an American former Major League Baseball (MLB) pitcher who played in 1975 with the Detroit Tigers. He batted and threw right-handed. Brookens had a 0–0 record, with a 5.23 earned run average (ERA), in three games, in his one-year career.

He was drafted by the Washington Senators in the fifth round of the 1967 amateur draft.

Brookens' cousin, Tom Brookens, also played in the majors, with the Tigers, New York Yankees, and Cleveland Indians.
