= Tom Veryzer =

American baseball player (1953–2014)

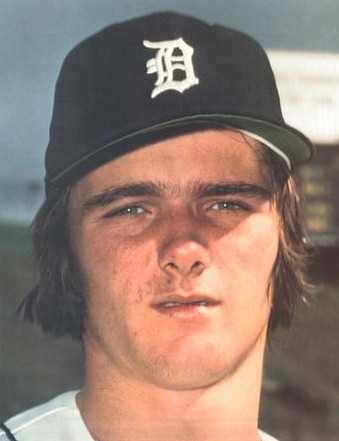
- Shortstop
- Born: February 11, 1953; Port Jefferson, New York, U.S.
- Died: July 8, 2014 (aged 61); Islip, New York, U.S.
- Batted: Right Threw: Right

MLB debut
- August 14, 1973, for the Detroit Tigers

Last MLB appearance
- October 7, 1984, for the Chicago Cubs

MLB statistics
- Batting average: .241
- Home runs: 14
- Runs batted in: 231
- Stats at Baseball Reference

Teams
- Detroit Tigers (1973–1977); Cleveland Indians (1978–1981); New York Mets (1982); Chicago Cubs (1983–1984)

Thomas Martin Veryzer (/vərˈaɪzər/ vər-EYE-zər; February 11, 1953 – July 8, 2014) was an American professional baseball shortstop. He played 12 years in Major League Baseball, appearing in 979 games for the Detroit Tigers (1973–1977), Cleveland Indians (1978–1981), New York Mets (1982), and Chicago Cubs (1983–1984). He ranked third in the American League in 1977 with a range factor of 5.16 per nine innings at shortstop. His career range factor of 4.841 per nine innings at shortstop ranks as the 25th best in Major League history.

== Early years ==
Veryzer was born in Port Jefferson, New York, in 1953. He attended Islip High School in Islip, New York. In high school, he played shortstop for Islip's baseball team and compiled a .467 batting average. He also played soccer and basketball at Islip where his father was the athletic director and basketball coach.

== Professional baseball ==
=== Minor leagues ===
Veryzer was drafted by the Detroit Tigers in the first round (eleventh pick overall) of the 1971 Major League Baseball draft. He signed a bonus contract with the Tigers in June 1971. His older brother, James, had been drafted by the Kansas City Athletics in the 49th round of the 1967 Major League Baseball draft, but had also moved to the Tigers' organization by 1971 as well.

Veryzer played for the Bristol Tigers upon graduating from high school in 1971. He batted just .225 with four home runs and 20 RBIs, but his defensive play earned him Appalachian League MVP honors. He was promoted to the Montgomery Rebels in the Southern League in 1972 where he hit .220.

During spring training in 1973, Veryzer received acclaim for his potential. A Detroit scout predicted that Veryzer would be the greatest shortstop since Honus Wagner. A Chicago scout predicted he would be one of the five greatest shortstops of all time. Detroit manager Billy Martin called Veryzer "the best looking young shortstop I've ever seen." Despite the acclaim, Veryzer began the 1973 season with the Toledo Mud Hens of the International League where he raised his batting average to .250.

=== Detroit Tigers ===
In August 1973, Veryzer was called up by the Tigers. At age 20, he was the sixth youngest player in the American League when he was called up. With Ed Brinkman at shortstop, Veryzer saw little playing time in 1973; he batted .300 (six for 20) and had an RBI single off the Minnesota Twins' Dave Goltz in his first major league at-bat.

Veryzer returned to the minor leagues in 1974 season, batting .296 in 223 at bats with the Evansville Triplets. In August 1974, he was again called up by the Tigers when the team dealt Jim Northrup to the Montreal Expos. On September 20, 1974, he hit a two-run home run in the second inning to give the Tigers a 2–1 lead. After the Tigers surrendered the lead, he hit an RBI single in the seventh to tie the game back up. In all, he went three-for-four with a home run, two walks and four runs batted in.

The Tigers traded Brinkman in November 1974, and Veryzer became the Tigers' starting shortstop in 1975, appearing in 128 games at the position. On June 8, 1975, he doubled with two out in the ninth inning to break-up a no-hitter by Ken Holtzman. For the season, he batted .252 with five home runs and 48 RBIs (both career highs) while also hitting thirteen doubles to be named the shortstop on the Topps Rookie All-Star team. However, his 24 errors at short were fourth highest in the league.

Injuries limited Veryzer to 97 games in 1976. He returned healthy in 1977, but a horrible month of May (.093 batting average, five RBIs and two errors on the field) caused him to lose playing time to Mark Wagner and Chuck Scrivener. The three combined to bat .174 with three home runs and 33 RBIs while committing 26 errors. Veryzer was dealt to the Cleveland Indians for Charlie Spikes at the Winter Meetings on December 9, 1977, opening the door for Alan Trammell to assume the starting shortstop job in Detroit for the next 16 years.

=== Cleveland Indians ===
Larvell Blanks won the starting shortstop job out of spring training 1978, but inconsistent fielding led to his being replaced by Veryzer at the start of May. With Duane Kuiper at second and Buddy Bell at third, the Indians boasted one of the better fielding infields in the American League, however, light hitting relegated them to a sixth-place finish in the American League East. For his part, Veryzer batted .271 with one home run and 32 RBIs. His most memorable moment of the season may have come on September 13 when he drove in the winning run of the Indians' 2–1 victory over the Boston Red Sox with a successful suicide squeeze bunt, knocking the Red Sox out of first place.

His offensive numbers slumped to .220 with no home runs and 34 RBIs, but he had his finest season with the glove in 1979. Veryzer figured in ninety double plays while logging a career high .974 fielding percentage in a career high 702 chances. Tendinitis caused Veryzer to miss two weeks at the start of June, and a month of play in the second half of the 1980 season. He was at his best when healthy, however, batting .271 and putting up a .971 fielding percentage.

Likewise, injuries caused Veryzer to miss two weeks toward the end of the 1981 season. On May 15, 1981, Veryzer made a brilliant play on an Alfredo Griffin ground ball up the middle to record the first out of the day's match-up with the Toronto Blue Jays. From there, Indians pitcher Len Barker retired the next 26 batters he faced for the first perfect game in the majors since 1968.

=== New York Mets ===
In January 1982, Veryzer was traded to the New York Mets for pitcher Ray Searage. Veryzer competed with Ron Gardenhire for the starting shortstop role with Gardenhire winning the spot. Veryzer appeared in only 16 games at shortstop for the Mets, though he also filled in for 26 games at second base. He was batting .333 on June 1 when Claudell Washington ran into him trying to break up a double play. Veryzer sustained a clean break in the left fibula, ending his season.

=== Chicago Cubs ===
In April 1983, Veryzer was traded to the Chicago Cubs for two minor league pitchers. With Larry Bowa at short and Ryne Sandberg beginning his Hall of Fame career at second, Veryzer saw very little playing time with the Cubs. In two seasons with the Cubs, he made just 175 plate appearances, batting .198. However, playing with the Cubs allowed him to reach the post-season for the only time in his career in his final season. He appeared in three of the five games of the 1984 National League Championship Series as a late inning defensive replacement, logging his only career post-season at-bat in game four. He popped out to Garry Templeton in foul territory. He was cut by the Cubs during spring training in 1985.

Veryzer played 12 seasons in Major League Baseball, compiling a career batting average of .241, 687 hits, 231 RBIs, and 14 home runs.

== Later years and family ==
Veryzer and his wife, Vivian, had three children, Tom Jr., Billy, and Jennie. He was inducted into the Suffolk Sports Hall of Fame on Long Island in 1985. He died in July 2014 after suffering a stroke.
