= 1975 Major League Baseball draft =

Baseball draft of amateur players

Overview
- First selection: Danny Goodwin; California Angels
- First round selections: 24
- Hall of Famers: 2: P Lee Smith; OF Andre Dawson

The 1975 Major League Baseball draft took place prior to the 1975 MLB season. The draft saw the California Angels select Danny Goodwin first overall.

== First round selections ==
| = All-Star | = Baseball Hall of Famer |

The following are the first round picks in the 1975 Major League Baseball draft. Many baseball draft experts consider the 1975 draft to be the weakest in MLB history.

| Pick | Player | Team | Position | Hometown/School |
|---|---|---|---|---|
| 1 | Danny Goodwin | California Angels | Catcher | Southern University |
| 2 | Mike Lentz | San Diego Padres | Pitcher | Juanita High School |
| 3 | Les Filkins | Detroit Tigers | Outfield | George Washington High School |
| 4 | Brian Rosinski | Chicago Cubs | Outfield | Evanston Senior High School |
| 5 | Richard OKeefe | Milwaukee Brewers | Pitcher | Yorktown Heights High School |
| 6 | Butch Benton | New York Mets | Catcher | Godby High School |
| 7 | Rick Cerone | Cleveland Indians | Catcher | Seton Hall University |
| 8 | Ted Barnicle | San Francisco Giants | Pitcher | Jacksonville State University |
| 9 | Clint Hurdle | Kansas City Royals | Outfield | Merritt Island High School |
| 10 | Art Miles | Montreal Expos | Shortstop | David Crockett High School |
| 11 | Chris Knapp | Chicago White Sox | Pitcher | Central Michigan University |
| 12 | Sam Welborn | Philadelphia Phillies | Pitcher | Wichita Falls High School |
| 13 | Rick Sofield | Minnesota Twins | Shortstop | Morristown High School |
| 14 | Bo McLaughlin | Houston Astros | Pitcher | David Lipscomb College |
| 15 | Otis Foster | Boston Red Sox | First Base | High Point University |
| 16 | David Johnson | St. Louis Cardinals | Pitcher | Gaylord High School |
| 17 | Jim Gideon | Texas Rangers | Pitcher | University of Texas |
| 18 | Donald Young | Atlanta Braves | Catcher | Dos Pueblos High School |
| 19 | Jim McDonald | New York Yankees | First Base | Verbum Dei High School |
| 20 | Dale Berra | Pittsburgh Pirates | Shortstop | Montclair High School |
| 21 | Bruce Robinson | Oakland Athletics | Catcher | Stanford |
| 22 | Tony Moretto | Cincinnati Reds | Outfield | Harrison High School |
| 23 | Dave Ford | Baltimore Orioles | Pitcher | Lincoln West High School |
| 24 | Mark Bradley | Los Angeles Dodgers | Shortstop | Elizabethtown High School |

== Other notable selections ==
| = All-Star | = Baseball Hall of Famer |

| Round | Pick | Player | Team | Position |
|---|---|---|---|---|
| 2 | 28 | Lee Smith | Chicago Cubs | Pitcher |
| 3 | 49 | Carney Lansford | California Angels | Shortstop |
| 3 | 68 | Don Robinson | Pittsburgh Pirates | Pitcher |
| 4 | 75 | Jason Thompson | Detroit Tigers | Pitcher-First Baseman |
| 4 | 84 | Dickie Noles | Philadelphia Phillies | Pitcher |
| 5 | 99 | Lou Whitaker | Detroit Tigers | Third Baseman |
| 7 | 156 | Keith Moreland | Philadelphia Phillies | Third Baseman |
| 11 | 250 | Andre Dawson | Montreal Expos | Outfielder |
| 15 | 357 | Bob Horner* | Oakland Athletics | Shortstop |
| 16 | 384 | Dave Stewart | Los Angeles Dodgers | Pitcher |
| 20 | 473 | Glenn Hubbard | Atlanta Braves | Second Baseman |
| 21 | 484 | John Tudor* | New York Mets | Pitcher |

* Did not sign

| Preceded by Bill Almon | 1st Overall Picks; Danny Goodwin | Succeeded by Floyd Bannister |
