= Wilmington, North Carolina =

Wilmington
- City
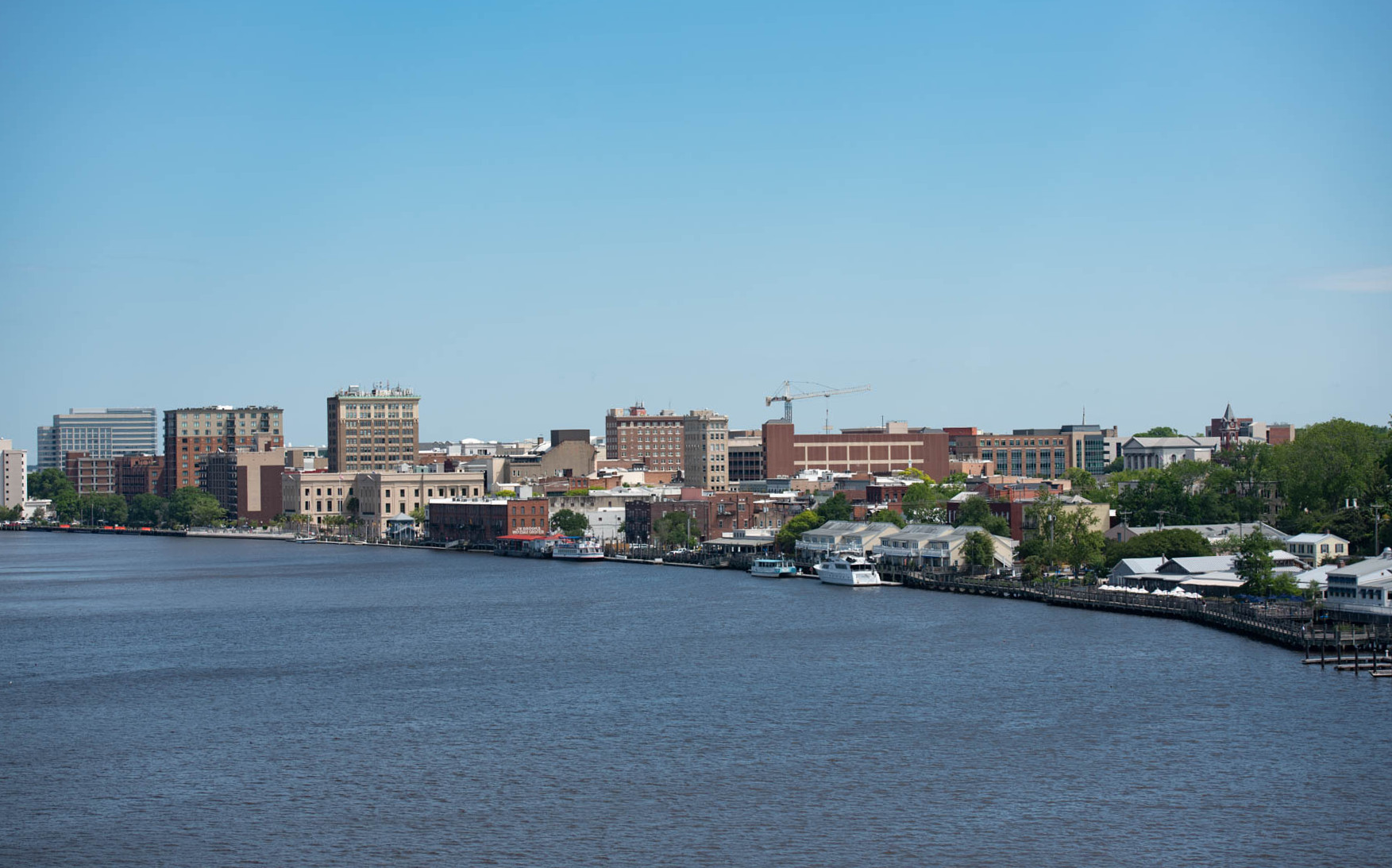
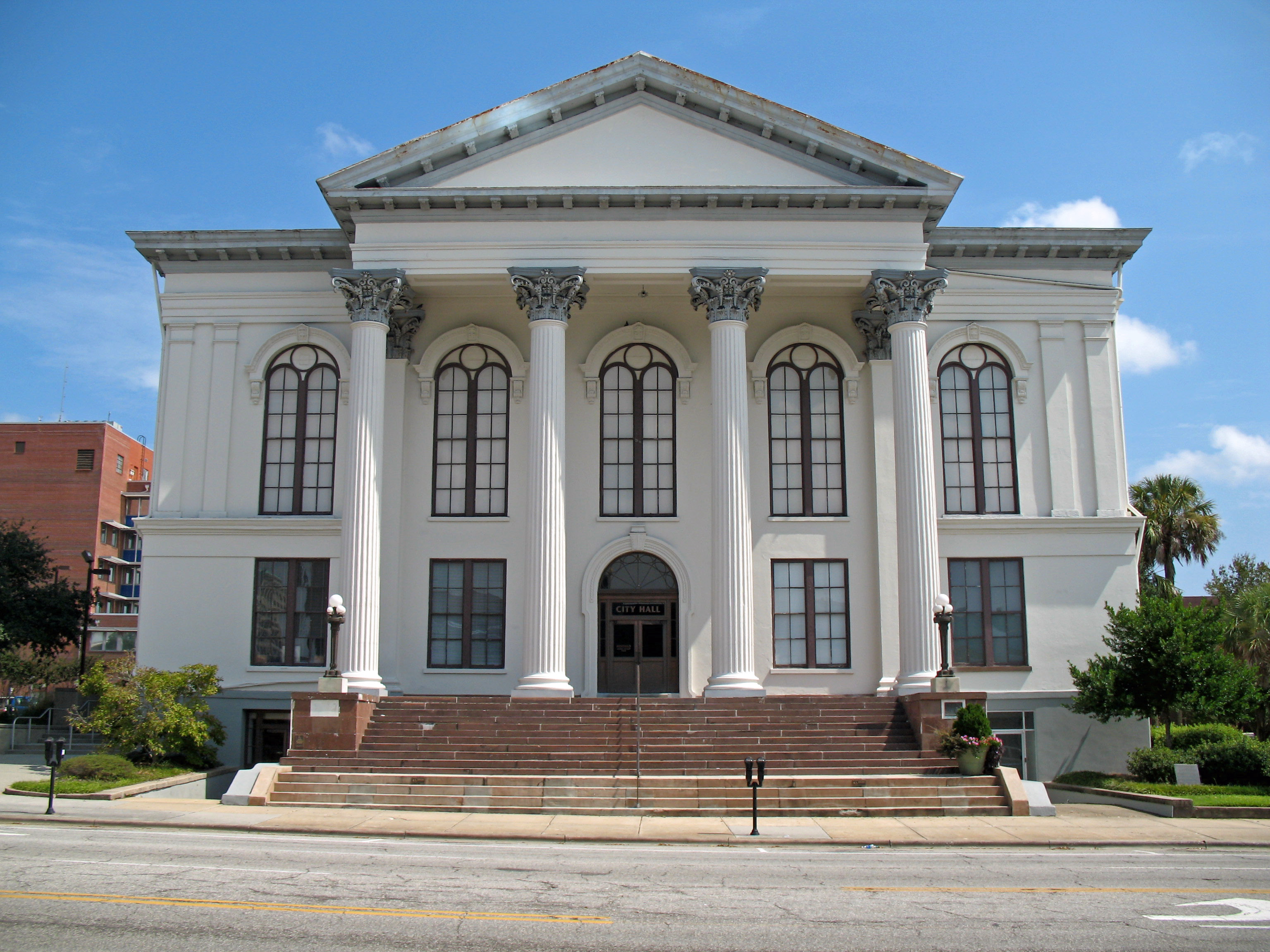
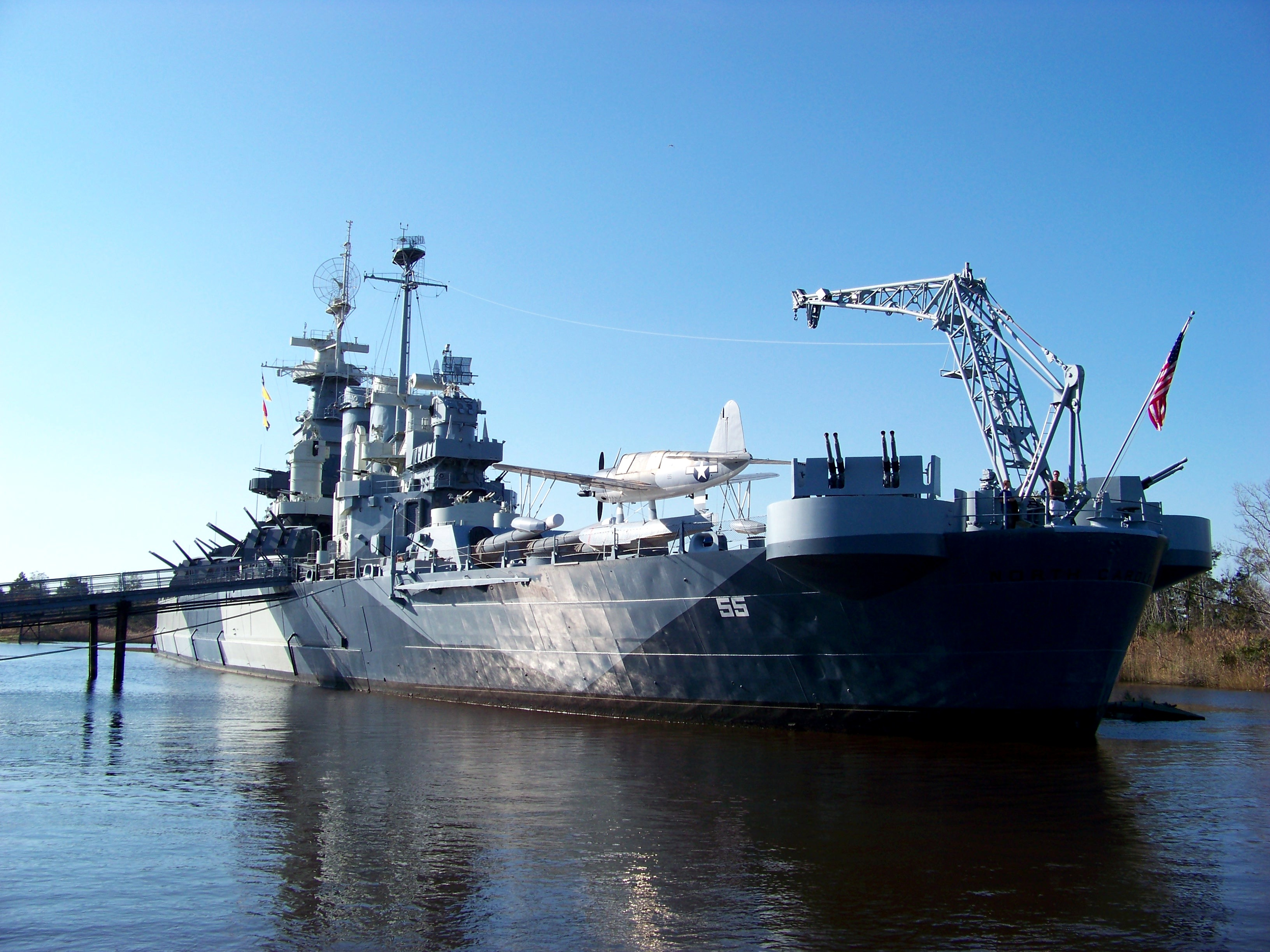
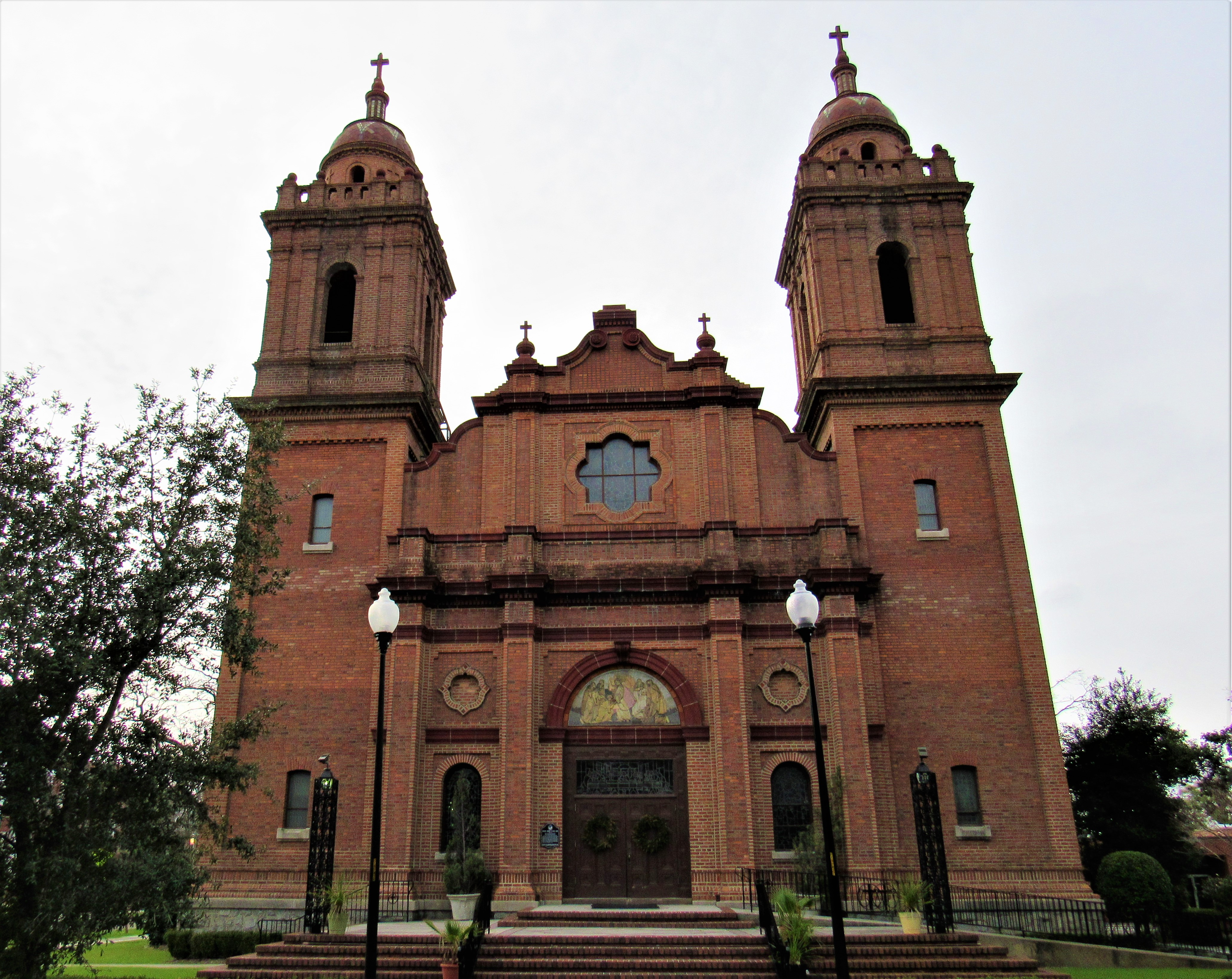
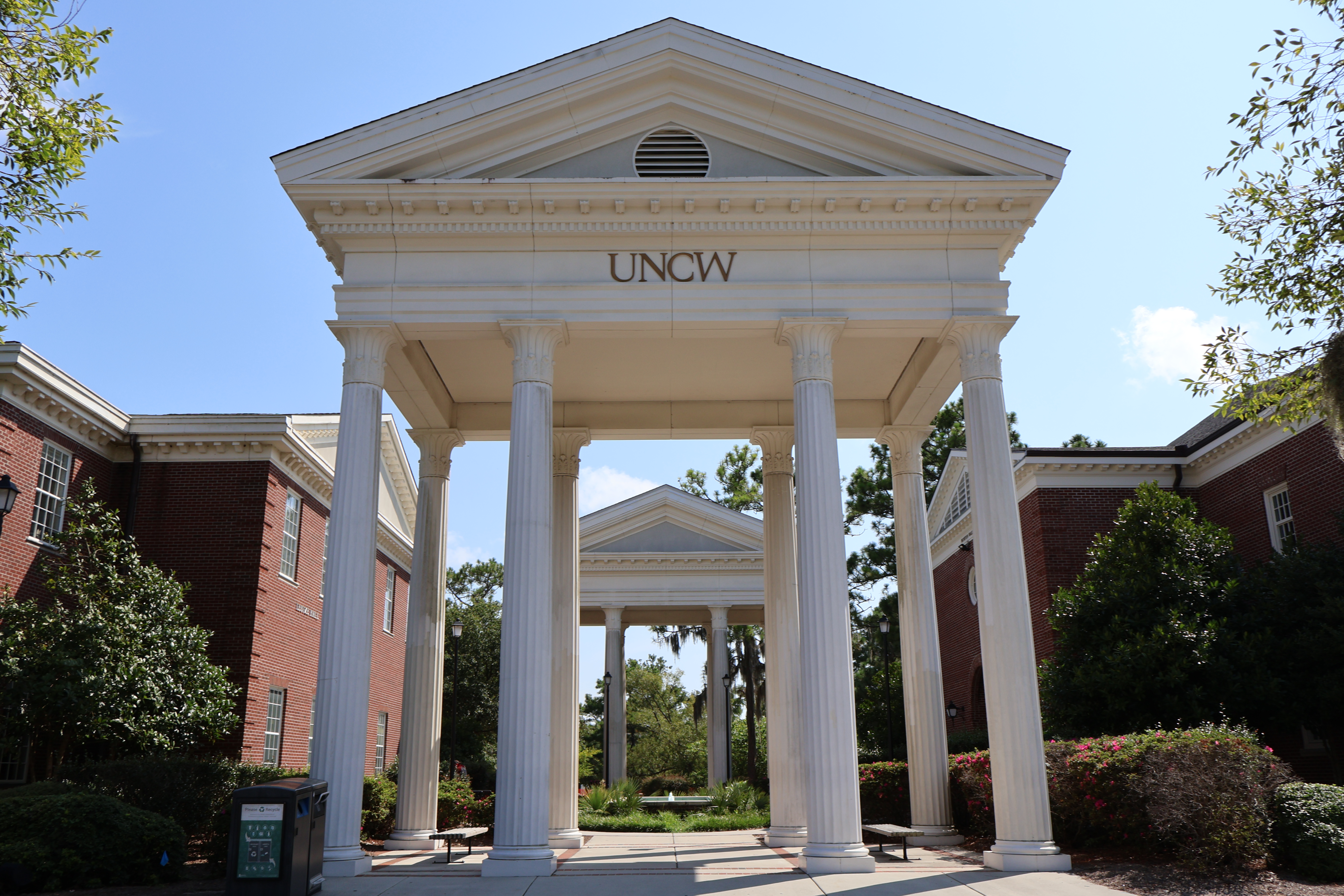
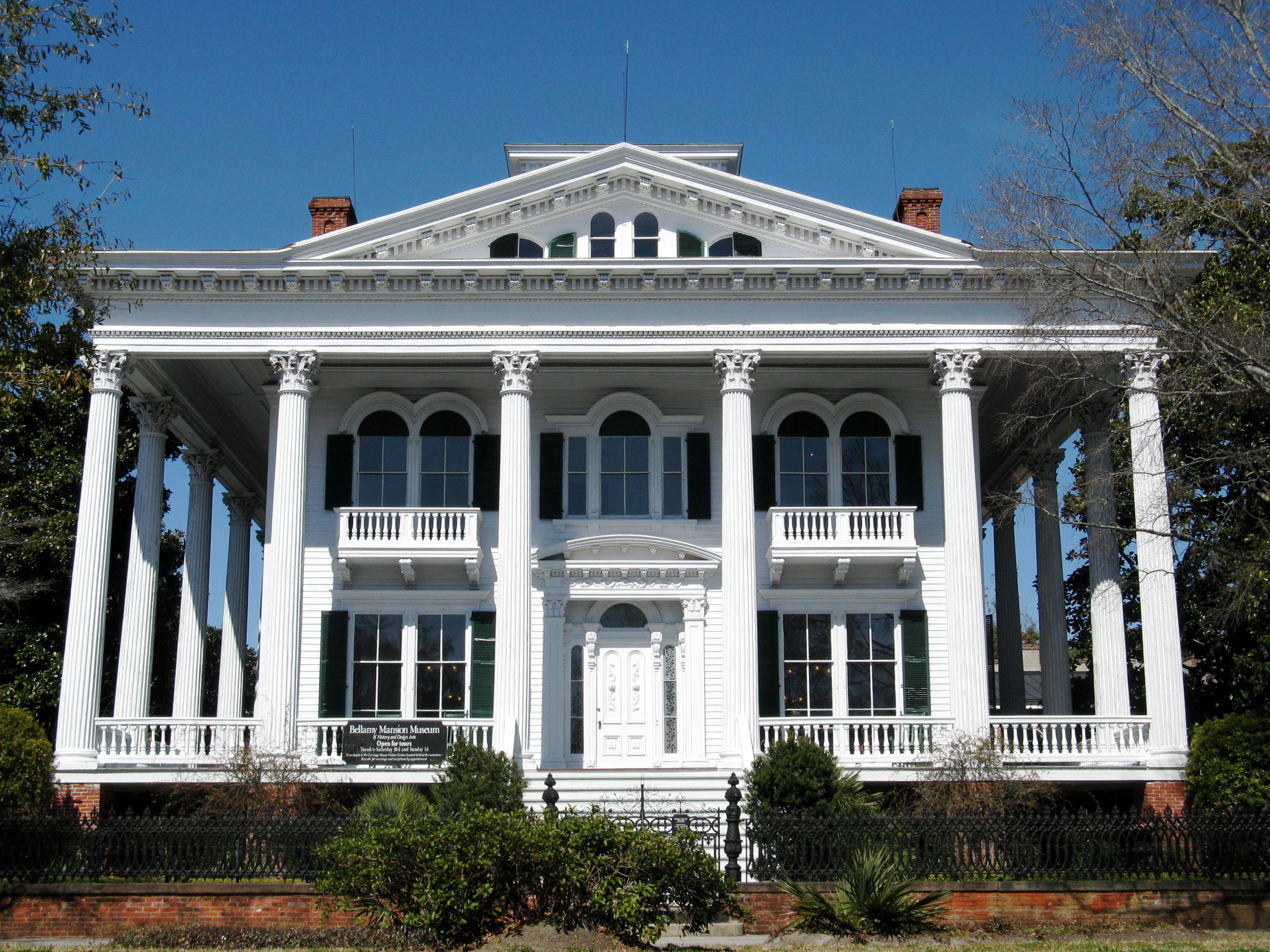
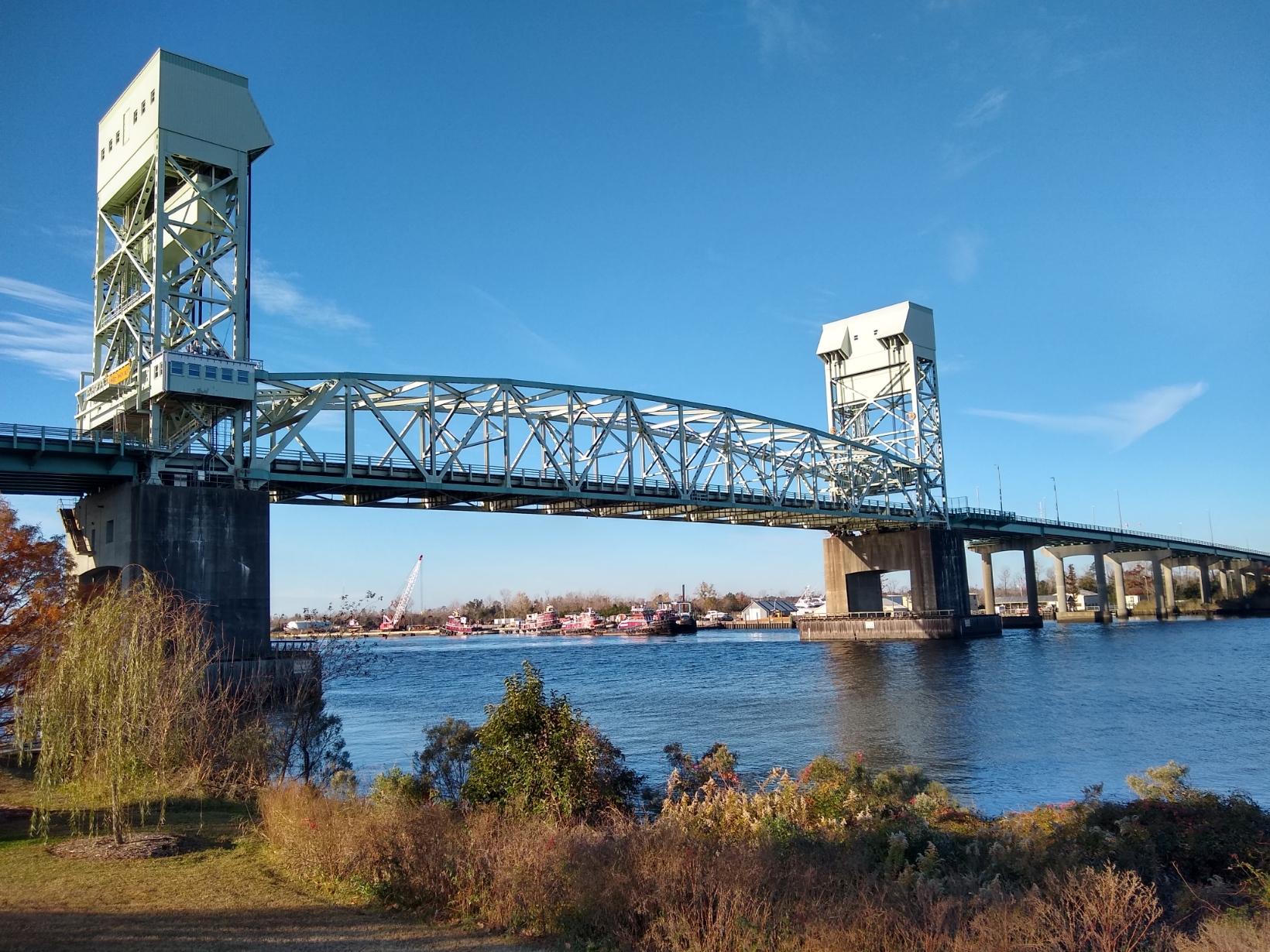
- Wilmington skyline City Hall/Thalian Hall USS North Carolina Basilica Shrine of St. Mary University of North Carolina Wilmington Bellamy Mansion Cape Fear Memorial Bridge

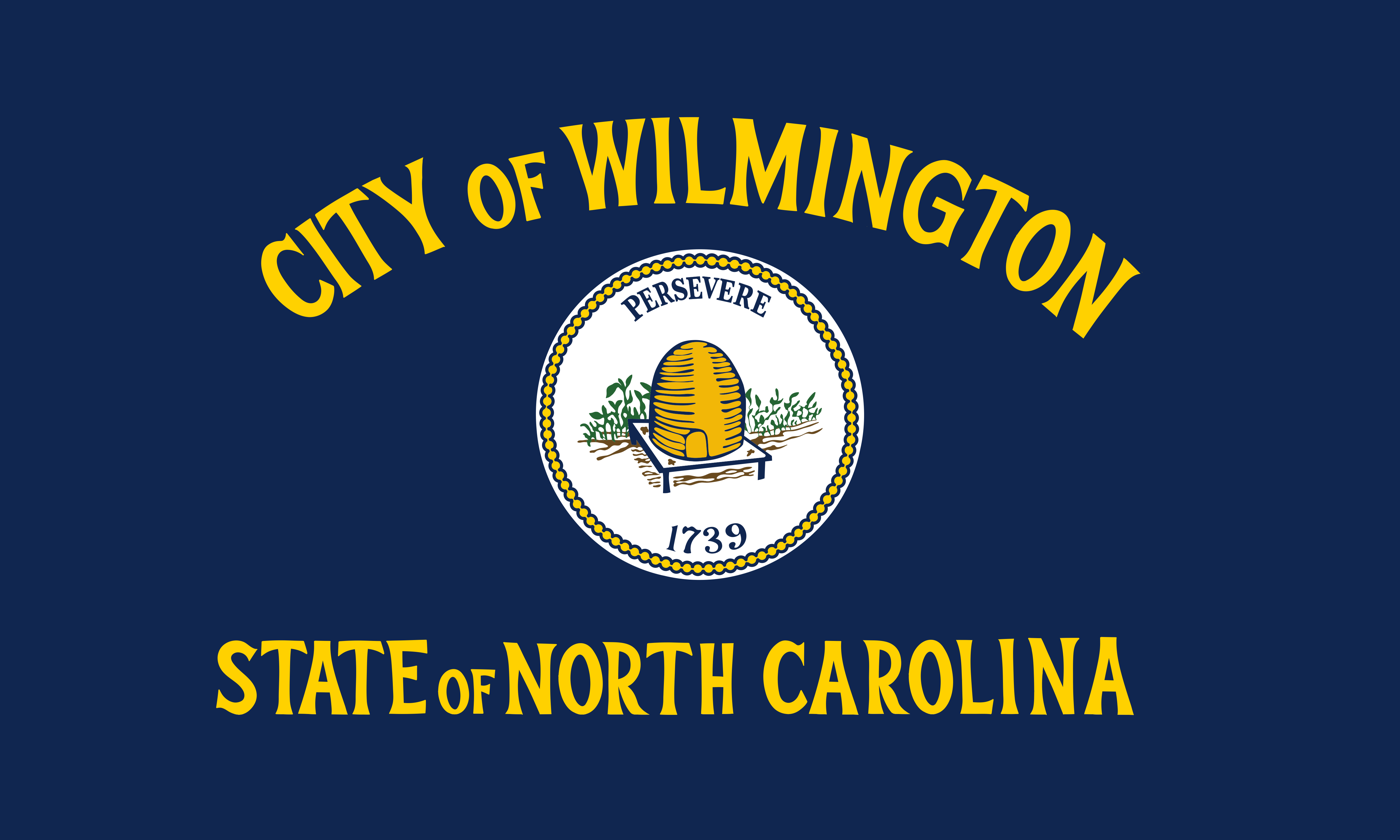
- Flag Seal Logo
- Nicknames: The Port City, ILM, Hollywood of the East, Wilmywood
- Motto: "Persevere"
- Location in New Hanover County, North Carolina

- Location within North Carolina Location within the United States
- Coordinates: 34°12′36″N 77°53′12″W
- Country: United States
- State: North Carolina
- County: New Hanover
- Incorporated: February 20, 1739
- Named for: Spencer Compton, 1st Earl of Wilmington

Government
  - Type: Council–manager
  - Mayor: Bill Saffo (D)

Area
  - Total: 52.97 sq mi (137.19 km^{2})
  - Land: 51.41 sq mi (133.14 km^{2})
  - Water: 1.56 sq mi (4.05 km^{2}) 2.95%
- Elevation: 43 ft (13 m)

Population (2020)
  - Total: 115,451
  - Estimate (2023): 122,698
  - Rank: 241st in the United States; 8th in North Carolina
  - Density: 2,245.9/sq mi (867.15/km^{2})
  - Urban: 255,329 (US: 159th)
  - Urban density: 1,795/sq mi (693/km^{2})
  - Metro: 467,337 (US: 115th)
- Time zone: UTC−5 (EST)
  - Summer (DST): UTC−4 (EDT)
- ZIP codes: 28401–28412
- Area codes: 910, 472
- FIPS code: 37-74440
- GNIS feature ID: 2405754
- Primary Airport: Wilmington International Airport
- Website: wilmingtonnc.gov

Wilmington is a port city in New Hanover County, North Carolina, United States. With a population of 115,451 as of the 2020 census, it is the eighth-most populous city in the state. The county seat of New Hanover County, it is the principal city of the Wilmington metropolitan area, which includes New Hanover, Brunswick, and Pender counties. As of 2023, the region had an estimated population of 467,337.

Wilmington's residential area lies between the Cape Fear River and the Atlantic Ocean, and the city developed as a commercial port in the colonial era. The city was founded in the 1730s, preceded in its foundation in the area by Brunswick Town and Charles Towne. These two towns were abandoned, leaving Wilmington as the main settlement on the Cape Fear River. After going through a series of different names (New Carthage, New Liverpool, Newton), its name became Wilmington. In 1739, Colonel William Bartram, the uncle of the naturalist, introduced a bill to establish Wilmington, named for one of his patrons, Spencer Compton, 1st Earl of Wilmington.

Toward the end of the 19th century, Wilmington was a majority-black, racially integrated, prosperous city – and the most populous in North Carolina. It suffered what became known as the Wilmington massacre in 1898, when white supremacists launched a coup that overthrew the legitimately elected local Fusionist government. It resulted in the expulsion of opposition black and white political leaders from the city, destruction of the property and businesses of black citizens, including the city's only black newspaper, and deaths ranging from an estimated 60 to more than 300 people. By 1910, Charlotte overtook Wilmington as North Carolina's most populous city.

Wilmington's downtown includes a 1.75-mile (2.82 km) riverwalk, developed as a tourist attraction in the late 20th century. In 2003, the city was designated by the U.S. Congress as a "Coast Guard City", one of 29 cities that currently bear that designation. It was formerly the home port for the USCGC Diligence, a United States Coast Guard medium-endurance cutter. Wilmington was declared the first World War II Heritage City in the country in 2020. The World War II battleship USS North Carolina, now a war memorial, is moored across from the downtown port area, and is open to the public for tours. Other attractions include the Cape Fear Museum of History and Science and the Children's Museum of Wilmington.

The city is home to the University of North Carolina Wilmington. Wilmington is also the home of Cinespace Wilmington, (Note: The studio complex was built and owned by De Laurentiis Entertainment Group (DEG) until 1989, Carolco Pictures until 1996, and EUE/Screen Gems Studios until 2023.) the largest domestic television and movie production facility outside California. Dream Stage 10, the facility's newest sound stage, is the third-largest in the United States. It houses the largest special-effects water tank in North America. After the studio complex's opening in 1984, Wilmington became a major center of American film and television production. Numerous movies and television series—in a range of genres—have been filmed/produced in or near the city.

== History ==
=== Colonial beginnings ===
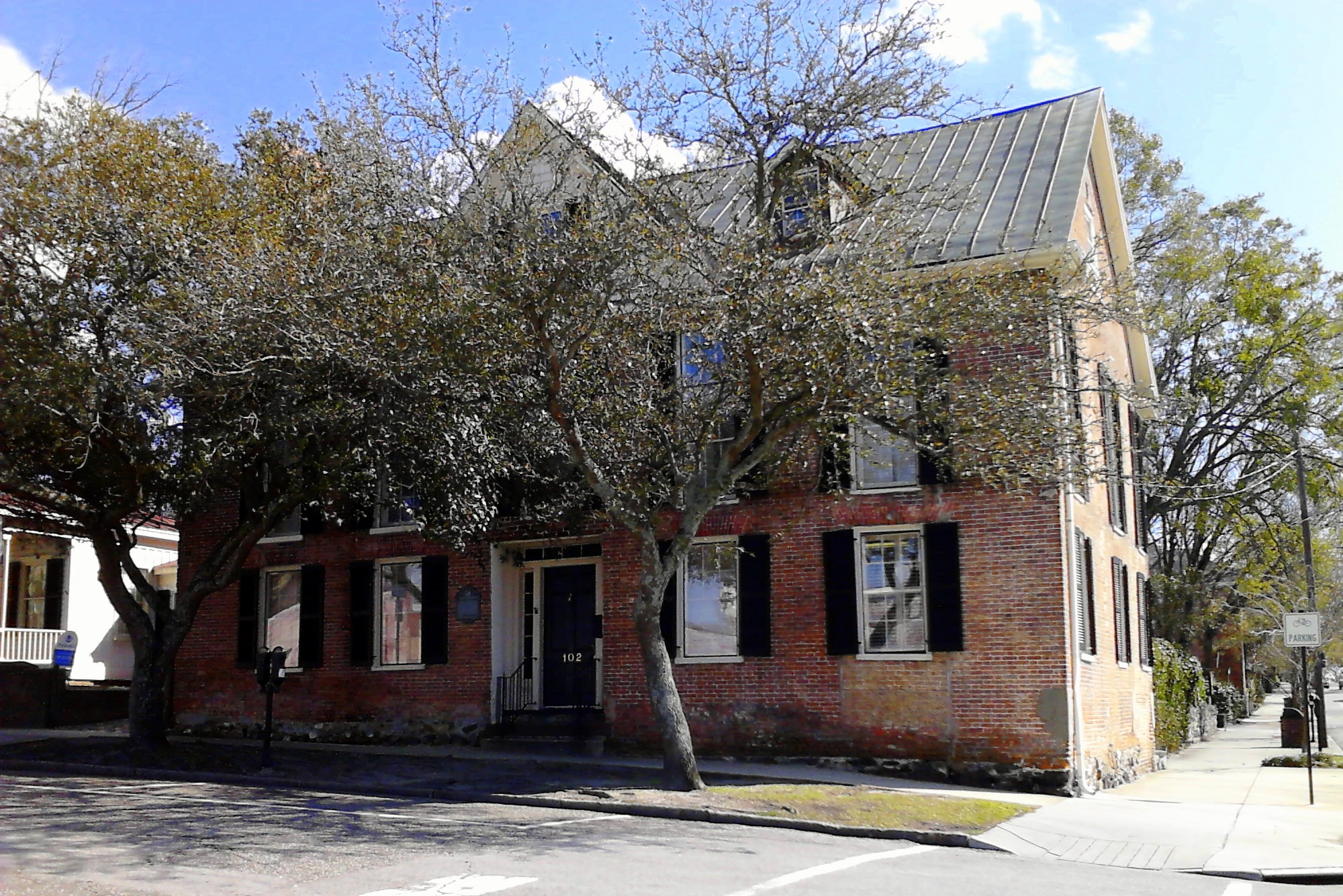
Mitchell-Anderson House (built 1738)

The city was founded in the 1730s. After going through a series of different names (New Carthage, New London, Newton), its name became Wilmington. In 1739, Col. William Bartram, the uncle of the naturalist, introduced a bill to establish Wilmington, named for one of his patrons, Spencer Compton, Earl of Wilmington.

The area along the river had been inhabited by various successive cultures of indigenous peoples for thousands of years.

In the early 16th century, Italian explorer Giovanni da Verrazzano, commissioned by the king of France with a French crew, was reportedly the first European to see this area, including the city's present site. The first permanent colonial settlement in the area was established in the 1720s by European settlers. In September 1732, a community was founded on land owned by John Watson on the Cape Fear River, at the confluence of its northwest and northeast branches. The settlement, founded by the first royal governor, George Burrington, was called New Carthage, and then New Liverpool; it gradually took on the name New Town or Newton. Governor Gabriel Johnston soon after established his government there for the North Carolina colony.

Some early settlers of Wilmington came from the Albemarle and Pamlico regions, as well as from the colonies of Virginia and South Carolina, but most new settlers migrated from the northern colonies, the West Indies, and Northern Europe. Many of the early settlers were indentured servants from Northern Europe. As the indentured servants gained their freedom and fewer could be persuaded to travel to North America because of improving conditions back home, the settlers imported an increasing number of slaves to satisfy the labor demand. By 1767, African slaves accounted for more than 62% of the population of the Lower Cape Fear region. Many worked in the port as laborers, and some in ship-related trades.

Naval stores and lumber fueled the region's economy, both before and after the American Revolution. During the Revolutionary War, the British maintained a garrison at Fort Johnston near Wilmington.

=== Revolutionary era ===
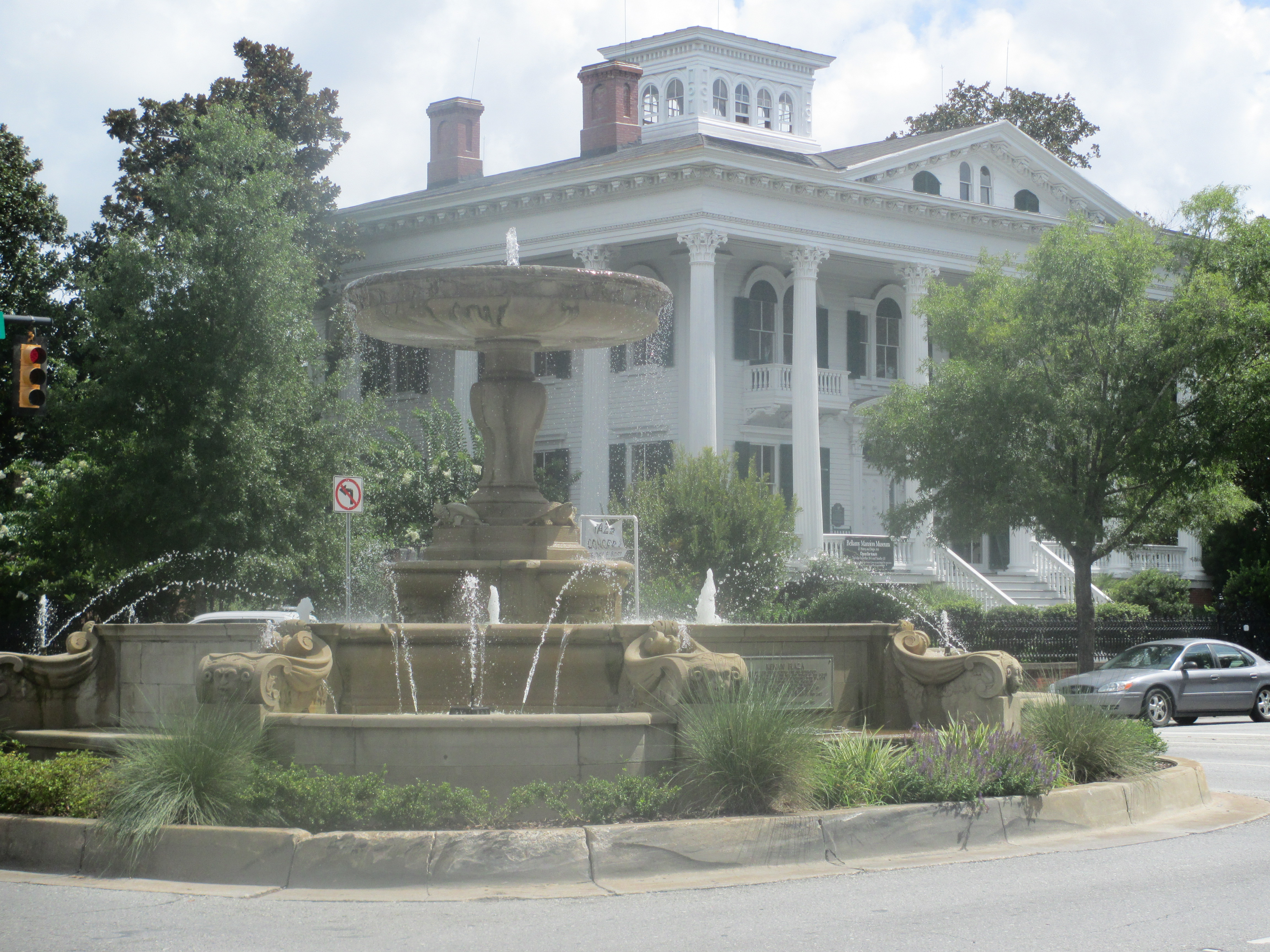
The Bellamy Mansion draws many tourists annually to downtown.

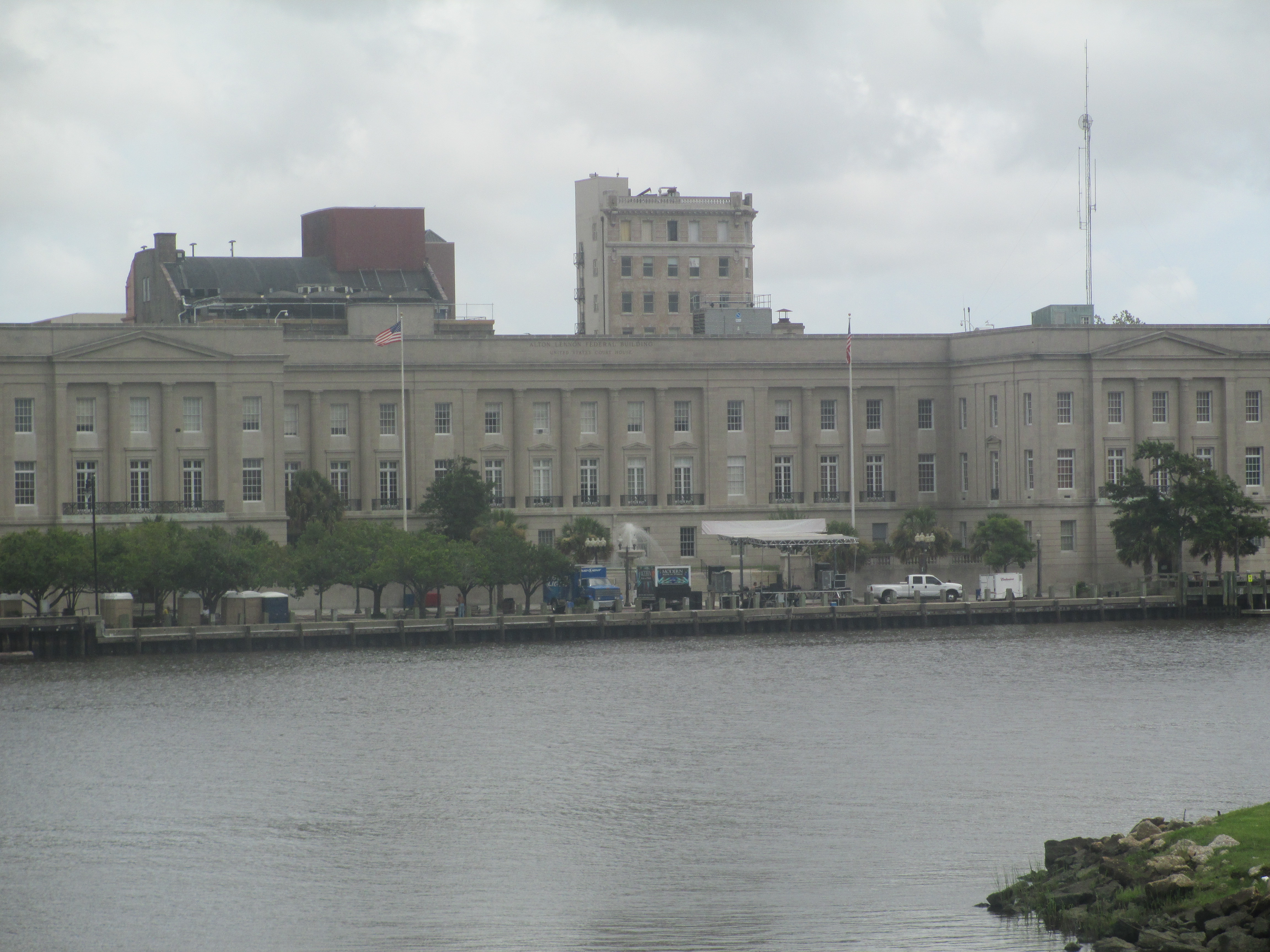
Alton Lennon Federal Building and Courthouse, the backdrop of Andy Griffith's Matlock television series

Due to Wilmington's commercial importance as a major port, it had a critical role in opposition to the British in the years leading up to the revolution. The city had outspoken political leaders who influenced and led the resistance movement in North Carolina. The foremost of these was Wilmington resident Cornelius Harnett, who was serving in the General Assembly at the time, and where he rallied opposition to the Sugar Act in 1764. When the British Parliament passed the Stamp Act the following year, designed to raise revenue for the Crown with a kind of tax on shipping, Wilmington was the site of an elaborate demonstration against it.

On October 19, 1765, several hundred townspeople gathered in protest of the new law, burned an effigy of one town resident who favored the act, and toasted to "Liberty, Property, and No Stamp Duty." On October 31, another crowd gathered in a symbolic funeral of "Liberty". Before the effigy was buried, though, Liberty was found to have a pulse, and celebration ensued.

William Houston of Duplin County was appointed stamp receiver for Cape Fear. When Houston visited Wilmington on business, still unaware of his appointment, he recounted,

"The Inhabitants immediately assembled about me & demanded a Categorical Answer whether I intended to put the Act relating [to] the Stamps in force. The Town Bell was rung[,] Drums [were] beating, Colours [were] flying and [a] great concourse of People [were] gathered together." For the sake of his own life, and "to quiet the Minds of the inraged [sic] and furious Mobb...," Houston resigned his position at the courthouse.

Governor William Tryon made attempts to mitigate the opposition, to no avail. On November 18, 1765, he pleaded his case directly to prominent residents of the area. They said the law restricted their rights. When the stamps arrived on November 28 on HMS Diligence, Tryon ordered them to be kept on board. Shipping on the Cape Fear River was stopped, as were the functions of the courts.

Tryon, after having received his official commission as governor (a position he had assumed only after the death of Arthur Dobbs), was brought to Wilmington by Captain Constantine Phipps on a barge from the Diligence, and "was received cordially by the gentlemen of the borough." He was greeted with the firing of seventeen pieces of artillery, and the New Hanover County Regiment of the North Carolina militia, who had lined the streets. This "warm welcome" was spoiled, however, after a dispute arose between Captain Phipps and captains of ships in the harbor regarding the display of their colors. The townspeople became infuriated with Phipps and threats were made against both sides. After Tryon harangued them for their actions, the townspeople gathered around the barrels of punch and ox he had brought as refreshments. The barrels were broken open, letting the punch spill into the streets; they threw the head of the ox into the pillory, and gave its body to the enslaved population. Because of the unrest, Tryon moved his seat of government to New Bern instead of Wilmington.

On February 18, 1766, two merchant ships arrived without stamped papers at Brunswick Town. Each ship provided signed statements from the collectors at their respective ports of origin that no were stamps available, but Captain Jacob Lobb of the British cruiser Viper seized the vessels. In response, numerous residents from southern counties met in Wilmington. The group organized as the Sons of Liberty and pledged to block implementation of the Stamp Act. The following day, as many as a thousand men, including the mayor and aldermen of Wilmington, were led by Cornelius Harnett to Brunswick to confront Tryon. The governor was unyielding, but a mob retrieved the seized ships. They forced royal customs officers and public officials in the region to swear never to issue stamped paper. The Westminster Parliament repealed the Stamp Act in March 1766.

=== Antebellum period ===
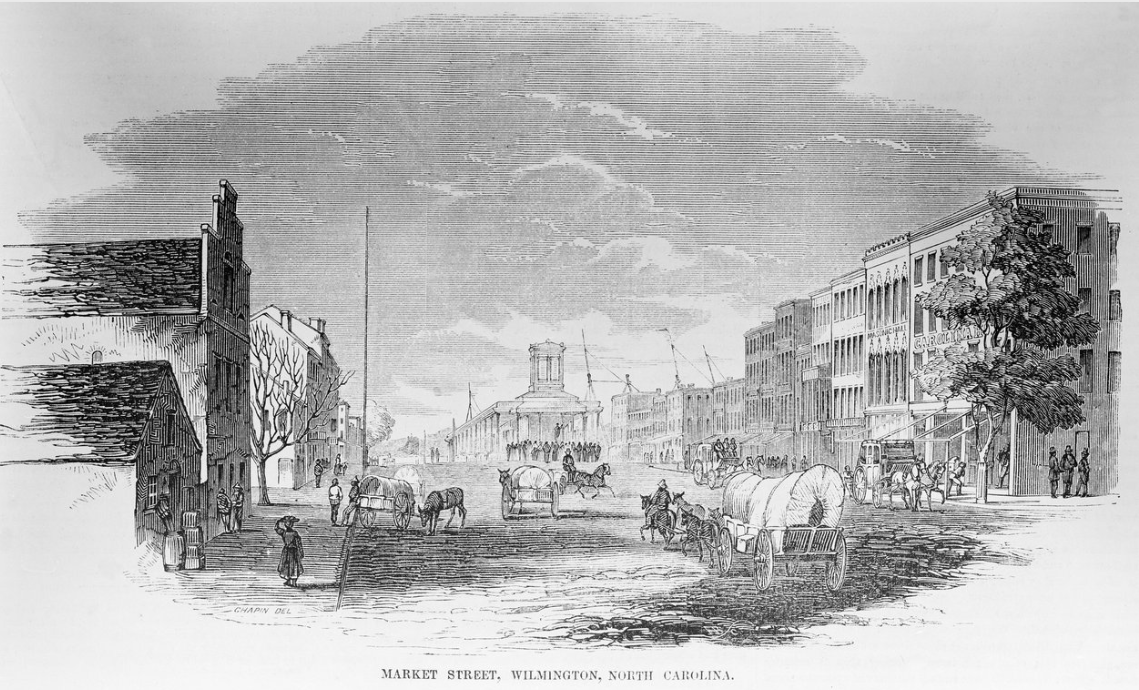
Market Street, facing west, in 1855.

In the 1830s, citizens of Wilmington became eager to take advantage of railroad transportation. At this time, the shipping tonnage registered at Wilmington was 9,035. Plans were developed to build a railroad line from the capital, Raleigh, to Wilmington. When Raleigh citizens declined to subscribe in sufficient number to stock to raise money for the project, organizers changed the terminus to Weldon. When the railroad line was completed in 1840, it was the longest single line of railroad track in the world. The railroad also controlled a fleet of steamboats that ran between Wilmington and Charleston; these were used both for passenger travel and freight. Regular boat lines served Fayetteville, and packet lines traveled to northern ports. The city was a main stopover point, contributing greatly to its commerce.

By mid-century, the churchyard of St. James Episcopal Church and other town cemeteries had become filled with graves. On November 16, 1853, a group of citizens, organized as "the Proprietors of the Wilmington Cemetery", was formed to develop a new cemetery. Sixty-five acres of land around Burnt Mill Creek were chosen as the site for what would be called Oakdale Cemetery. It was the first rural cemetery in North Carolina. The cemetery's first interment, on February 6, 1855, was six-year-old Annie deRosset. Many remains from St. James churchyard were relocated to the new cemetery.

The Wilmington Gas Light Company was established in 1854. Soon after, streetlights were powered by gas made from lightwood and rosin, replacing the old street oil lamps. On December 27, 1855, the first cornerstone was laid, and construction began on a new city hall. A grant from the Thalian Association funded the attached opera house, named Thalian Hall. In 1857, the city opened its first public school, named the Union Free School, on 6th Street between Nun and Church Streets, serving White students.

Wilmington had a Black majority population before the Civil War. While most were slaves, the city had a significant community of free people of color, who developed businesses and trades. For a period up to Nat Turner's rebellion, they had been allowed to vote, carry arms, and serve in the militia. Fears after the rebellion resulted in the state legislature passing laws to restrict the rights of free Blacks.

=== Civil War ===
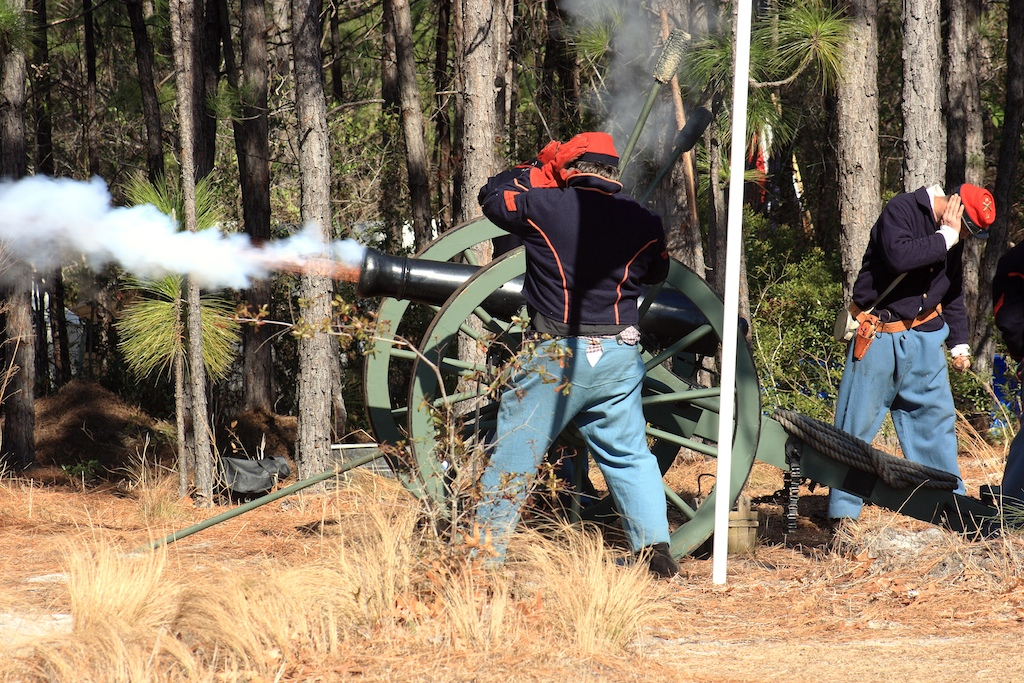
Cannon firing at a re-enactment of the Battle of Forks Road near the Cameron Art Museum

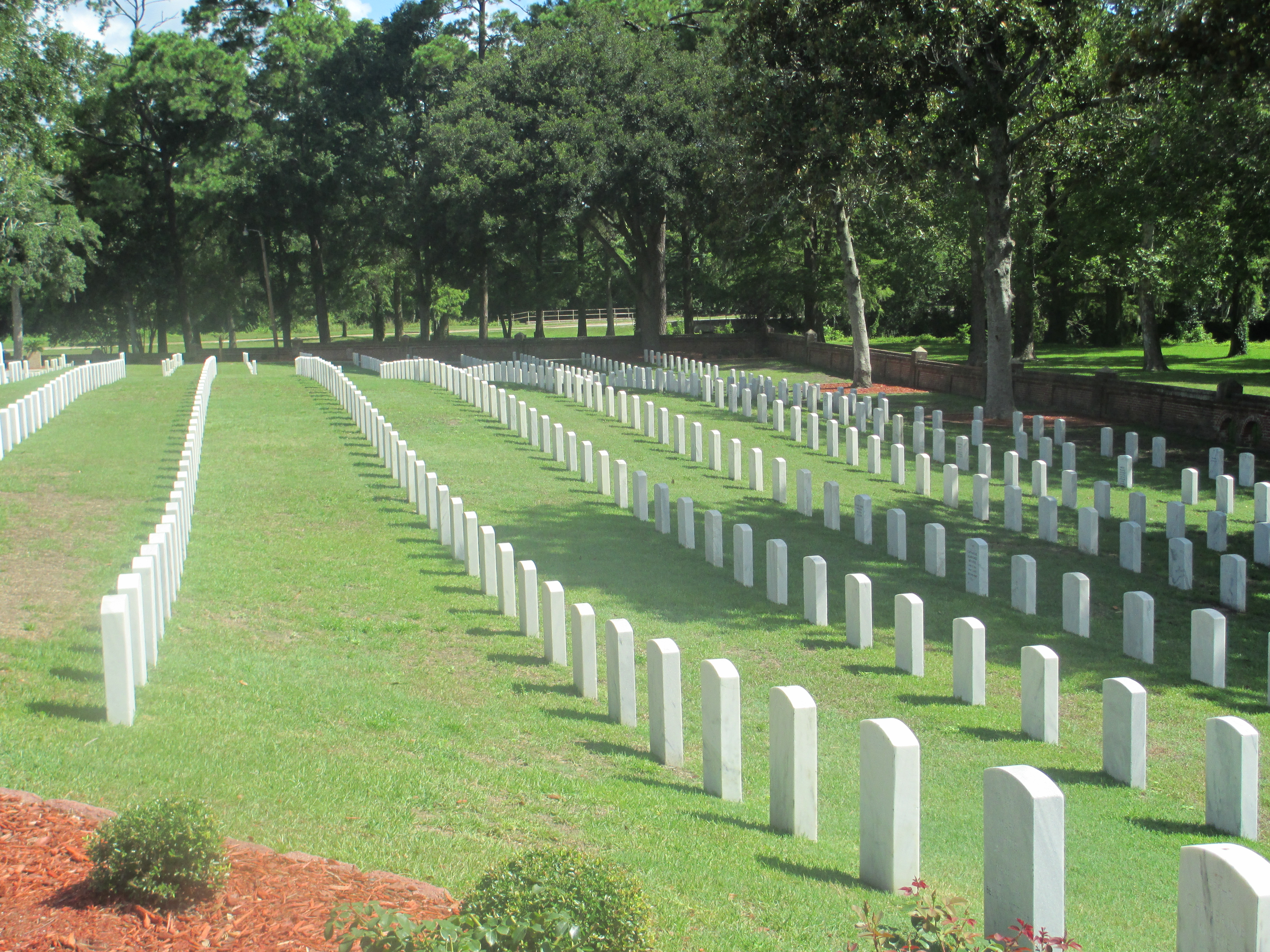
Wilmington National Cemetery has markers dating to the American Revolution and the American Civil War.

During the Civil War, the port was the major base for Confederate and privately owned blockade runners, which delivered badly needed supplies from England. The Union mounted a blockade to reduce the goods received by the South. The city was captured by Union forces in the Battle of Wilmington in February 1865, about one month after the fall of Fort Fisher had closed the port. Wilmington was the last Confederate port to be captured. As nearly all the military action took place some distance from the city, numerous antebellum houses and other buildings survived the war years.

In mid-August 1862, Wilmington was devastated by a deadly outbreak of yellow fever. This fever outbreak was brought about by a blockade runner, Kate. Sources suggest that the runner had crew members who were sick before the ship landed, but Dr. W.T. Wragg would later write an article in the New York Journal of Medicine that there were at least five cases in the city before the ship arrived. Dr. Wragg treated many of the yellow fever victims during the outbreak and claimed that the dirtiness of the city and the fumes of the dirty water left by heavy rains caused the disease. By the end of the outbreak at least 1,500 and perhaps as many as 2,000, contracted yellow fever. Of those, between 650 and 800 died, a mortality rate approximately 40 percent. Walter Reed would later discover in 1900 that yellow fever was transmitted by mosquitoes, so Wilmington's outbreak had to be introduced by a third party and spread by mosquitoes in the city.

=== Reconstruction era and 1898 massacre ===
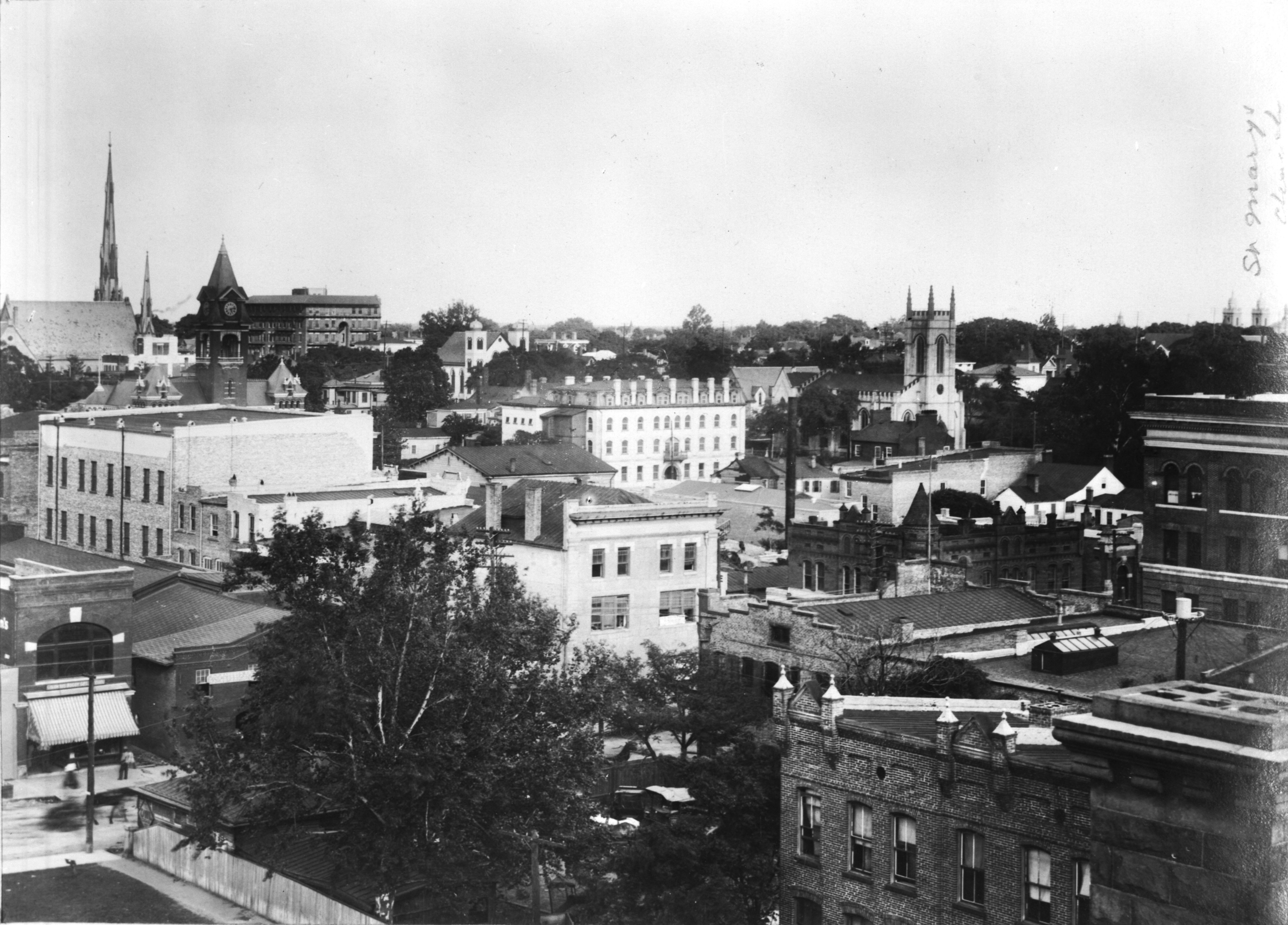
Wilmington c. 1898

During the Reconstruction era, former free Blacks and newly emancipated freedmen built a community in the city. About 55% of its residents were Black people. At the time, Wilmington was the most populous city and the economic capital of the state.

Three of the city's aldermen were Black. Black people were also in positions of justice of the peace, deputy clerk of court, street superintendent, coroners, policemen, mail clerks, and mail carriers.

At the time, Black people accounted for over 30% of Wilmington's skilled craftsmen, such as mechanics, carpenters, jewelers, watchmakers, painters, plasterers, plumbers, stevedores, blacksmiths, masons, and wheelwrights. In addition, they owned 10 of the city's 11 restaurants and were 90% of the city's 22 barbers. The city had more Black bootmakers/shoemakers than White ones, and half of the city's tailors were Black. Lastly, two brothers, Alexander and Frank Manly, owned the Wilmington Daily Record, the only Black-owned newspaper in the state, and one of the few in the country at that time.

In the 1890s, a coalition of Republicans and Populists had gained state and federal offices. The Democrats were determined to reassert their control. Violence increased around elections in this period, as armed White paramilitary insurgents, known as Red Shirts, worked to suppress Black and Republican voting. White Democrats regained control of the state legislature and sought to impose white supremacy, but some Blacks continued to be elected to local offices.

The Wilmington massacre of 1898 (also known as the Wilmington insurrection) occurred as a result of the racially charged political conflict that had occurred in the decades after the Civil War and efforts by White Democrats to re-establish white supremacy and overturn Black voting. In 1898, a cadre of White Democrats, professionals, and businessmen planned to overthrow the city government if their candidates were not elected. Two days after the election, in which a White Republican was elected mayor and both White and Black aldermen were elected, more than 1500 White men (led by Democrat Alfred M. Waddell, an unsuccessful gubernatorial candidate in 1896) attacked and burned the only Black-owned daily newspaper in the state and ran off the new officers. They overthrew the legitimately elected municipal government. Waddell and his men forced the elected Republican city officials to resign at gunpoint and replaced them with men selected by leading White Democrats. Waddell was elected mayor by the newly seated board of aldermen that day. Prominent Black Americans and White Republicans were banished from the city in the following days. This is the only such coup d'état in United States history.

Whites attacked and killed an estimated 60 to more than 300 people; no Whites died in the violence. As a result of the attacks, more than 2100 Blacks permanently left the city, leaving a hole among its professional and middle classes. The demographic change was so large that the city became majority White, rather than the majority Black it was before the coup.

Following these events, the North Carolina legislature passed a new constitution that raised barriers to voter registration, imposing requirements for poll taxes and literacy tests that effectively disfranchised most Black voters, following the example of Mississippi. Blacks were essentially excluded from the political system until after the enactment of the federal Voting Rights Act of 1965.

=== 20th century ===
Wilmington is home to the Bijou Theater, which began as a tent in 1904 and progressed to a permanent structure in 1906. It operated until 1956, making it the oldest movie theater in the state and one of the oldest, continuously running theaters in the country. In 1910, Charlotte passed Wilmington to become North Carolina's most populous city. In the mid-20th century, efforts to preserve many historic building began. Due to this, many historic buildings were listed as National Register of Historic Places. Since the 1980s, Wilmington has remained the largest film and television production area in the state; many locations in and outside the city have been used for filming. In 1990, the extension of Interstate 40 to New Hanover County was opened and officially connected the region to the Interstate Highway System.

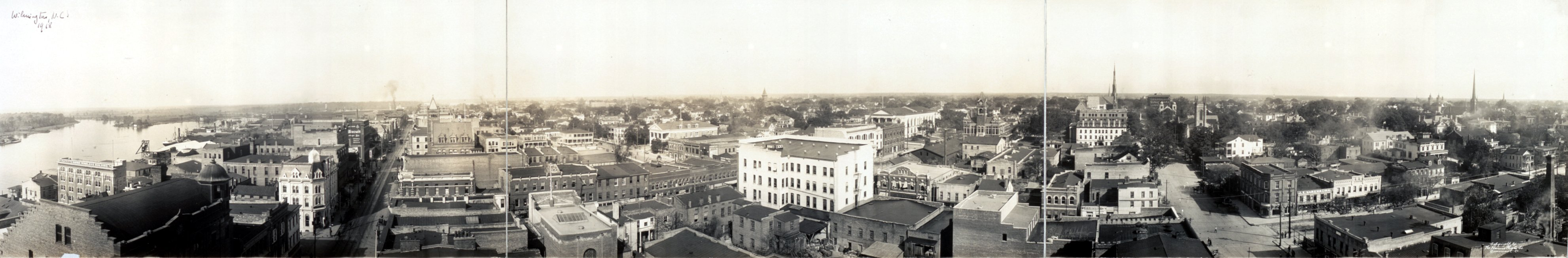
A 1918 panorama of downtown Wilmington

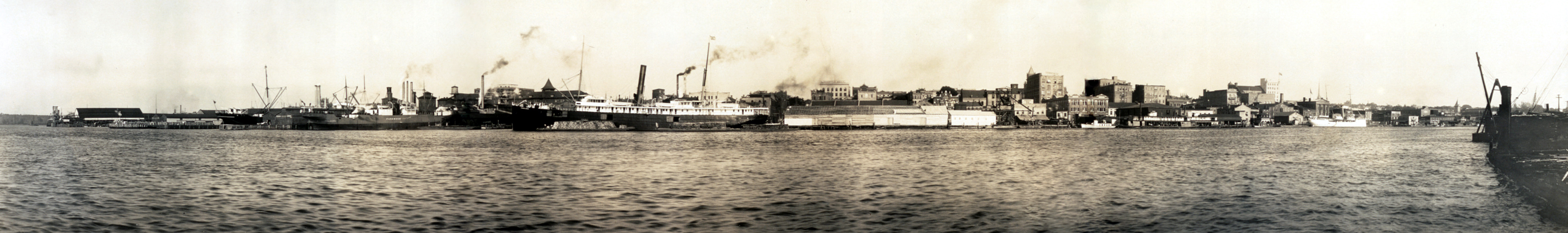
A 1918 panorama of Wilmington's waterfront

During World War II, Wilmington was the home of the North Carolina Shipbuilding Company. The shipyard was created as part of the U.S. government's Emergency Shipbuilding Program. Workers built 243 ships in Wilmington during the five years the company operated.

Three prisoner-of-war (POW) camps operated in the city from February 1944 through April 1946. At their peak, the camps held 550 German prisoners. The first camp was located on the corner of Shipyard Boulevard and Carolina Beach Road; it was moved downtown to Ann Street, between 8th and 10th Avenues, when it outgrew the original location. A smaller contingent of prisoners was assigned to a third site, working in the officers' mess and doing groundskeeping at Bluethenthal Army Air Base, which is now Wilmington International Airport.

=== 21st century ===
Starting in the 1990s, Wilmington began to grow rapidly, partially due to the film industry and the completion of I-40. The city successfully annexed the areas of Seagate in 1998 and Masonboro in 2000. The annexation of Monkey Junction was stopped in 2012 by the North Carolina House of Representatives after local backlash. In 2017, a chemical compound called GenX, discharged by a Chemours plant near Fayetteville, North Carolina, was first found to be present in the Cape Fear River; a major water source for the region. It was also revealed that the same plant had been discharging the chemical compound since 1980. In 2020, then-President Donald Trump designated Wilmington as the first World War II Heritage City in the country due to the city's contributions during the war.

=== National Register of Historic Places ===
The Audubon Trolley Station, Brookwood Historic District, Carolina Heights Historic District, Carolina Place Historic District, City Hall/Thalian Hall, Delgrado School, Federal Building and Courthouse, Fort Fisher, Gabriel's Landing, James Walker Nursing School Quarters, Market Street Mansion District, Masonboro Sound Historic District, Moores Creek National Battlefield, Sunset Park Historic District, USS North Carolina (BB-55) National Historic Landmark, Westbrook-Ardmore Historic District, William Hooper School (Former), Wilmington Historic District, and Wilmington National Cemetery are listed on the National Register of Historic Places.

== Geography ==
Interactive map of Wilmington

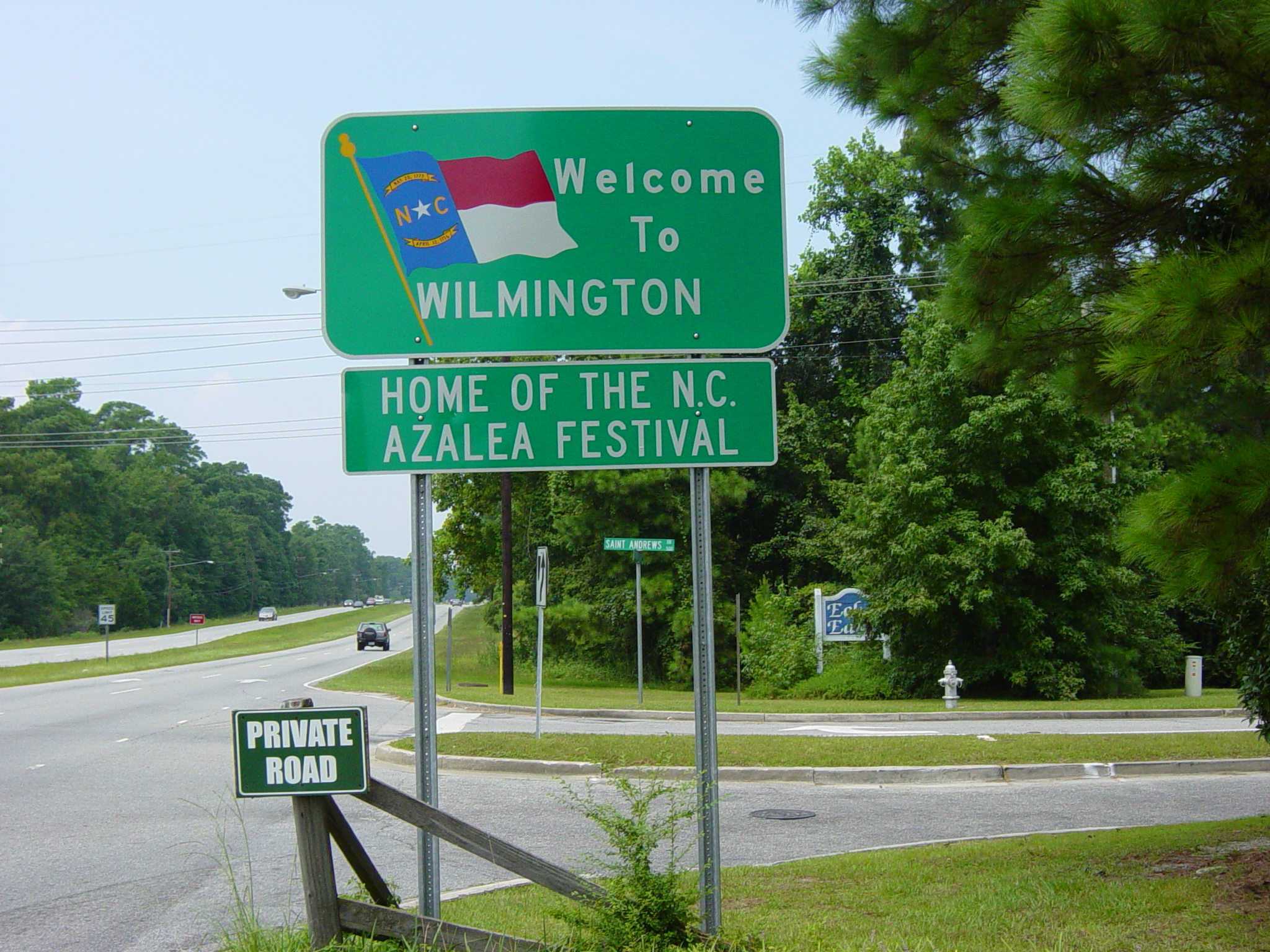
"Welcome to Wilmington" sign

Wilmington is the eastern terminus of Interstate 40, an east-west freeway that ends 2,554 miles away at Barstow, California, where it joins I-15, the gateway to Southern California. This road passes through many major cities and state capitals along the way.

According to the United States Census Bureau, the city has a total area of 52.97 square miles (137.2 km^{2}), of which 51.41 square miles (133.2 km^{2}) is land and 1.56 square miles (4.0 km^{2}) (2.95%) is water. Wrightsville Beach is a common destination in the Wilmington area. Carolina Beach and Kure Beach also add to the city's attractions.

=== Climate ===
Wilmington has a humid subtropical climate (Köppen Cfa), with these characteristics:

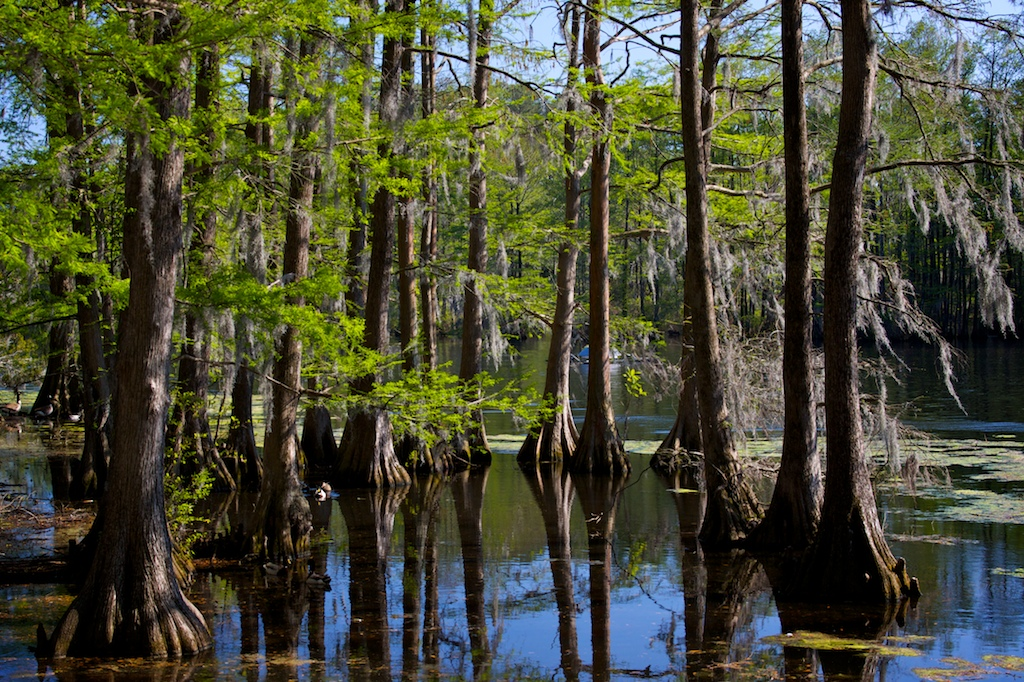
Cypress trees in Greenfield Lake

- Winters are generally mild with January highs in the mid-50s °F (≈12 °C) and lows in the mid-30s °F (≈1 °C). Snowfall does not occur in most years, and when it does, is generally light.
- Spring is reasonably lengthy, beginning in late February and lasting to early May. The presence of abundant dense vegetation in the area causes significant pollen dusting in the springtime that tends to turn rooftops and cars yellow.
- Summer brings high humidity, with daily high temperatures usually ranging from the upper 80s to lower 90s °F (31–34 °C), and daily low temperatures usually from 70 to 75 °F (≈22 °C). Heat indices can easily break the 100 °F (38 °C) mark, though the actual temperature does not in most years. Due to the proximity of warm Atlantic Ocean waters and prevailing tropical-system tracks, the Wilmington area is subject to hurricane or tropical storm activity, mostly from August to early October, with an average frequency of once every seven years. Such tropical systems can bring high winds and very heavy rains, sometimes 4 inches (100 mm) or more in a single tropical system. Precipitation in Wilmington occurs year-round. April is the driest month, with just over 3 inches (76 mm) of rain on average, and August and September are the wettest months, with over 8 inches (200 mm) of rain each, on average. In an average year, the July to September period delivers nearly 40% of annual rainfall.
- Autumn is also generally humid at the beginning, with the threat from tropical weather systems (hurricanes, tropical storms, and tropical depressions) peaking in September.
- Normal January mean temperature: 46.0 °F (7.8 °C). The coldest month in recorded history was January 1977, averaging 35.7 °F (2.1 °C). January 1981 had a colder average minimum of 25.8 °F (−3.4 °C).
- Normal July mean temperature: 81.1 °F (27.3 °C). The hottest month in recorded history was July 2012, averaging 84.7 °F (29.3 °C). July 1993 had a hotter average maximum of 94.0 °F (34.4 °C).
- Average nights ≤ 32 °F (0 °C): 39
- First and last freezes of the season: November 18 and March 20, allowing a growing season of 244 days
- Average days ≥ 90 °F (32 °C): 43, but historically as low as 9 in 1909 and as high as 71 in 1980.
- First and last 90 °F highs: May 15, September 15
- Highest recorded temperature: 104 °F (40 °C) on June 27, 1952
- Lowest daily maximum temperature: 16 °F (−9 °C) on February 13, 1899 and December 30, 1917
- Highest daily minimum temperature: 83 °F (28 °C) on August 1, 1999, and August 9, 2007
- Lowest recorded temperature: 0 °F (−18 °C) on December 25, 1989
- Average annual precipitation: 60.15 inches (1,530 mm), but historically ranging from 27.68 in (703 mm) in 1909 to 102.40 in (2,601 mm) in 2018, aided by 23.02 inches of rain, September 13–16, from Hurricane Florence's slow movement across the Carolinas. The 2018 annual precipitation of 102.40 inches exceeded the previous record wettest year (1877, with 83.65 inches of precipitation).
- Wettest day: 13.38 in (339.9 mm) on September 15, 1999
- Driest month: 0.16 in (4.1 mm) in April 1995
- Wettest month: 24.13 in (612.9 mm) in September 2018, followed closely by 23.41 in (594.6 mm) in September 1999
- Winter average snowfall: 1.6 inches (4.1 cm) (the median amount is 0)
- Snowiest 24-hour period: 12.1 in (30.7 cm) on February 17–18, 1896
- Snowiest month: 15.3 in (38.9 cm) in December 1989, making the winter of 1989–90 the snowiest

Climate data for Wilmington Int'l, North Carolina (1991–2020 normals, extremes 1870–present) (Note: Official snowfall records for Wilmington were kept at the Weather Bureau in downtown from December 1870 to September 1951, and at Wilmington Int'l since October 1951. Precipitation, minimum temperature, and maximum temperature records date to January 1, 1871, March 1, 1873, and April 1, 1874, respectively. For more information, see ThreadEx.)
Month	Jan	Feb	Mar	Apr	May	Jun	Jul	Aug	Sep	Oct	Nov	Dec	Year
Record high °F (°C)	83 (28)	86 (30)	94 (34)	95 (35)	101 (38)	104 (40)	103 (39)	103 (39)	100 (38)	98 (37)	87 (31)	82 (28)	104 (40)
Mean maximum °F (°C)	74.7 (23.7)	76.6 (24.8)	82.4 (28.0)	86.9 (30.5)	92.0 (33.3)	96.3 (35.7)	97.0 (36.1)	96.0 (35.6)	92.1 (33.4)	87.0 (30.6)	81.2 (27.3)	75.4 (24.1)	98.3 (36.8)
Mean daily maximum °F (°C)	57.2 (14.0)	60.3 (15.7)	66.5 (19.2)	74.6 (23.7)	81.1 (27.3)	87.0 (30.6)	90.0 (32.2)	88.3 (31.3)	83.9 (28.8)	76.1 (24.5)	67.4 (19.7)	60.3 (15.7)	74.4 (23.6)
Daily mean °F (°C)	46.8 (8.2)	49.3 (9.6)	55.3 (12.9)	63.6 (17.6)	71.1 (21.7)	78.2 (25.7)	81.5 (27.5)	80.0 (26.7)	75.3 (24.1)	65.9 (18.8)	56.1 (13.4)	49.7 (9.8)	64.4 (18.0)
Mean daily minimum °F (°C)	36.3 (2.4)	38.4 (3.6)	44.1 (6.7)	52.6 (11.4)	61.1 (16.2)	69.3 (20.7)	73.0 (22.8)	71.7 (22.1)	66.7 (19.3)	55.6 (13.1)	44.8 (7.1)	39.1 (3.9)	54.4 (12.4)
Mean minimum °F (°C)	19.3 (−7.1)	23.1 (−4.9)	27.9 (−2.3)	36.4 (2.4)	47.2 (8.4)	57.6 (14.2)	65.2 (18.4)	63.5 (17.5)	54.9 (12.7)	39.6 (4.2)	29.2 (−1.6)	23.6 (−4.7)	17.5 (−8.1)
Record low °F (°C)	5 (−15)	5 (−15)	9 (−13)	28 (−2)	35 (2)	48 (9)	54 (12)	55 (13)	42 (6)	27 (−3)	16 (−9)	0 (−18)	0 (−18)
Average precipitation inches (mm)	3.81 (97)	3.47 (88)	3.97 (101)	3.07 (78)	4.54 (115)	5.67 (144)	6.86 (174)	8.16 (207)	8.69 (221)	4.66 (118)	3.56 (90)	3.69 (94)	60.15 (1,528)
Average snowfall inches (cm)	0.7 (1.8)	0.2 (0.51)	0.0 (0.0)	0.0 (0.0)	0.0 (0.0)	0.0 (0.0)	0.0 (0.0)	0.0 (0.0)	0.0 (0.0)	0.0 (0.0)	0.0 (0.0)	0.0 (0.0)	0.9 (2.3)
Average precipitation days (≥ 0.01 in)	9.9	9.5	9.6	7.7	9.6	11.2	13.2	13.9	10.7	8.0	8.5	9.9	121.7
Average snowy days (≥ 0.1 in)	0.4	0.2	0.0	0.0	0.0	0.0	0.0	0.0	0.0	0.0	0.0	0.1	0.7
Average relative humidity (%)	70.7	68.4	69.1	66.8	73.7	76.3	78.3	80.7	79.9	75.9	73.2	71.5	73.7
Mean monthly sunshine hours	181.5	182.1	238.0	276.3	285.3	280.1	280.7	254.3	230.0	229.3	197.4	181.1	2,816.1
Percentage possible sunshine	58	59	64	71	66	65	64	61	62	65	63	59	63
Source: NOAA (relative humidity and sun 1961–1990)

=== Cityscape ===
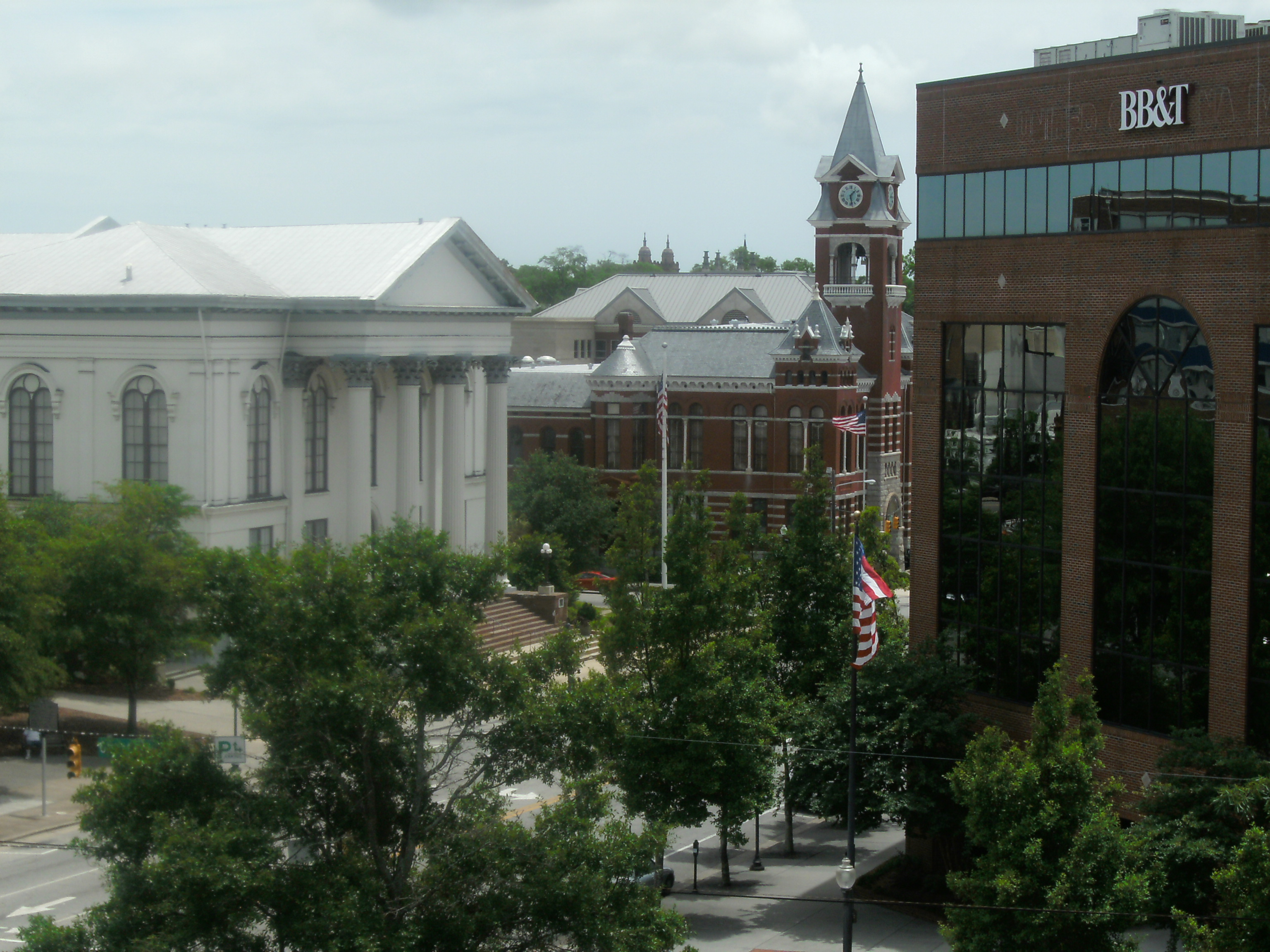
Wilmington theater and banking area

Wilmington boasts a large historic district encompassing nearly 300 blocks. Abandoned warehouses on downtown's northern end have been recently demolished making room for multimillion dollar projects, such as what was the world headquarters of Pharmaceutical Product Development and current tallest building in Wilmington at 228 feet (69 m). (The building was then bought by Thermo Fisher Scientific. In 2023, it was bought by the City of Wilmington and renamed "Skyline Center". It is now the main building for city government operations.) Other completed projects include a state-of-the-art convention center, Live Oak Bank Pavilion, Pier 33 Apartments, and The Cove houseboat community in Port City Marina.

Downtown/Old Wilmington

Downtown Monuments and Historic Buildings
The George Davis Monument (removed)
The Confederate Memorial (removed)
The Bellamy Mansion
Cotton Exchange of Wilmington
The Temple of Israel
The Murchison Building

== Demographics ==
Historical population
Census	Pop.	Note	%±
1800	1,689		—
1820	2,633		—
1830	3,791		44.0%
1840	5,335		40.7%
1850	7,264		36.2%
1860	9,552		31.5%
1870	13,446		40.8%
1880	17,350		29.0%
1890	20,056		15.6%
1900	20,976		4.6%
1910	25,748		22.7%
1920	33,372		29.6%
1930	32,270		−3.3%
1940	33,407		3.5%
1950	45,043		34.8%
1960	44,013		−2.3%
1970	46,169		4.9%
1980	44,000		−4.7%
1990	55,530		26.2%
2000	75,838		36.6%
2010	106,476		40.4%
2020	115,451		8.4%
2025 (est.)	126,809	▲	9.8%
U.S. Decennial Census; 2020

=== 2020 census ===
Wilmington, North Carolina – Racial and ethnic composition Note: the U.S. census treats Hispanic/Latino as an ethnic category. This table excludes Latinos from the racial categories and assigns them to a separate category. Hispanics/Latinos may be of any race.
Race / Ethnicity (NH = Non-Hispanic)	Pop 2000	Pop 2010	Pop 2020	% 2000	% 2010	% 2020
White alone (NH)	52,639	75,432	79,791	69.41%	70.84%	69.11%
Black or African American alone (NH)	19,423	20,850	18,828	25.61%	19.58%	16.31%
Native American or Alaska Native alone (NH)	242	379	317	0.32%	0.36%	0.27%
Asian alone (NH)	677	1,246	1,826	0.89%	1.17%	1.58%
Pacific Islander alone (NH)	60	61	98	0.08%	0.06%	0.08%
Some Other Race alone (NH)	108	195	554	0.14%	0.18%	0.48%
Mixed Race or Multi-Racial (NH)	698	1,826	4,493	0.92%	1.71%	3.89%
Hispanic or Latino (any race)	1,991	6,487	9,544	2.63%	6.09%	8.27%
Total	75,838	106,476	115,451	100.00%	100.00%	100.00%

As of the 2020 census, there were 115,451 people, 54,673 households, and 27,131 families residing in the city.

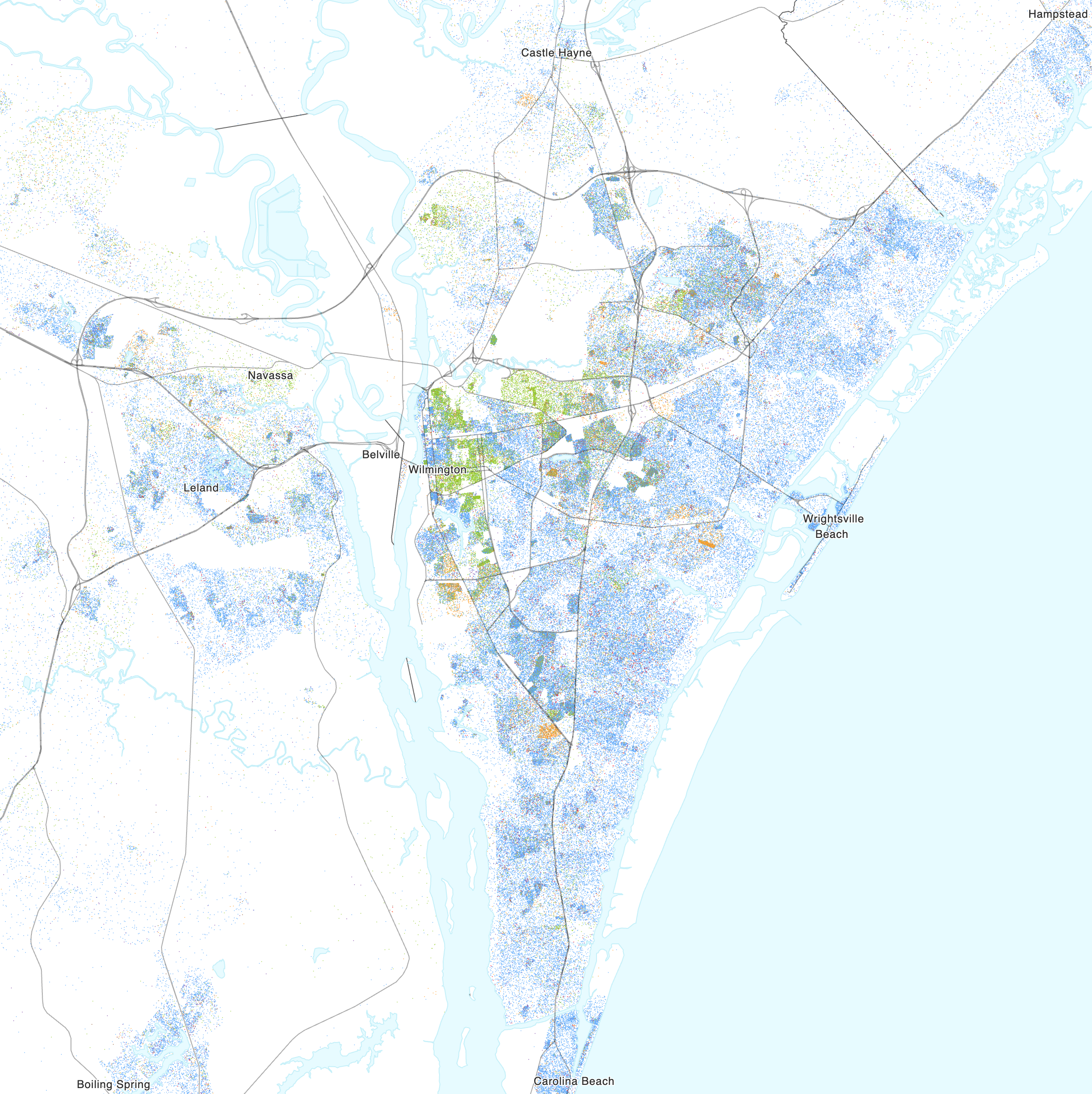
Map of racial distribution in Wilmington, 2020 U.S. census. Each dot is one person: ⬤ White ⬤ Black ⬤ Asian ⬤ Hispanic ⬤ Multiracial ⬤ Native American/Other

=== 2013 census estimate ===
At the 2013 census estimate, there were 112,067 people and 47,003 households in the city. The population density was 2,067.8 inhabitants per square mile (798.4/km^{2}) and there were 53,400 housing units. The racial composition of the city was: 73.5% White, 19.9% Black or African American, 6.1% Hispanic or Latino American, 1.2% Asian American, 0.5% Native American, 0.1% Native Hawaiian or other Pacific Islander.

There were 34,359 households, out of which 20.4% had children under the age of 18 living with them, 33.5% were married couples living together, 14.0% had a female householder with no husband present, and 49.5% were non-families. 36.6% of all households were made up of individuals, and 11.3% had someone living alone who was 65 years of age or older. The average household size was 2.10 and the average family size was 2.77.

In the city, 18.4% of the population was under the age of 18, 17.2% was from 18 to 24, 28.5% from 25 to 44, 20.6% from 45 to 64, and 15.3% was 65 years of age or older. The median age was 34 years. For every 100 females, there were 87.5 males. For every 100 females age 18 and over, there were 85.0 males.

The median income for a household in the city was $31,099, and the median income for a family was $41,891. Males had a median income of $30,803 versus $23,423 for females. The per capita income for the city was $21,503. About 13.3% of families and 19.6% of the population were below the poverty line, including 25.9% of those under age 18 and 12.0% of those age 65 or over.

=== Crime ===
Wilmington
- Crime rates* (2022)

Violent crimes
- Homicide: 10.0
- Rape: 66.5
- Robbery: 93.9
- Aggravated assault: 364.0
- Total violent crime: 534.4

Property crimes
- Burglary: 393.1
- Larceny-theft: 2,243.1
- Motor vehicle theft: 227.7
- Arson: 13.3
- Total property crime: 2,877.2
- Note: Reported crimes per 100,000 population Source: 2022 FBI UCR Data

Wilmington has an increasing problem with gang violence, and on October 15, 2013, the WPD and NHC sheriff's department created a joint task force to combat gang violence. Just a day later the city council approved $142,000 in funding for a gang investigative unit.

=== Religion ===
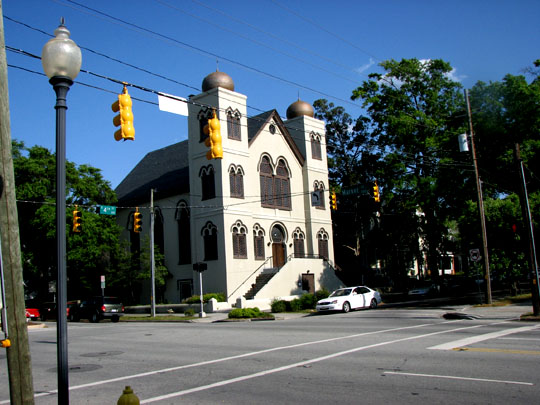
The Temple of Israel in downtown Wilmington

Approximately half of Wilmington's population is religiously affiliated (47.30%), with the majority of practitioners being Christian. The two largest Christian denominations in Wilmington are Protestant: Baptists (14.66%) and Methodists (8.29%), followed by Roman Catholics (7.42%). There are also a significant number of Presbyterians (3.19%), Episcopalians (2.30%), Pentecostals (1.45%), and Lutherans (1.32%). Other Christian denominations make up 7.02%, and the Latter-Day Saints have 0.90%. Much smaller is the proportion of residents who follow Islam (0.46%), and Judaism (0.25%). A small percentage of people practice Eastern religions (0.04%).

Wilmington has significant historical religious buildings, such as the Basilica Shrine of St. Mary and the Temple of Israel.

== Economy ==
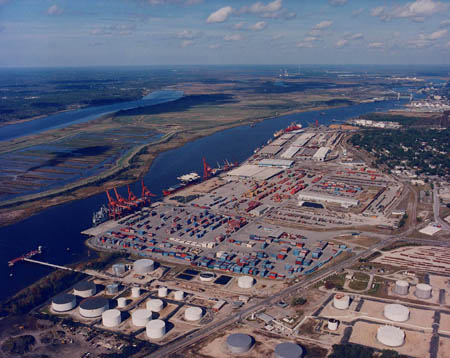
Port of Wilmington from the air

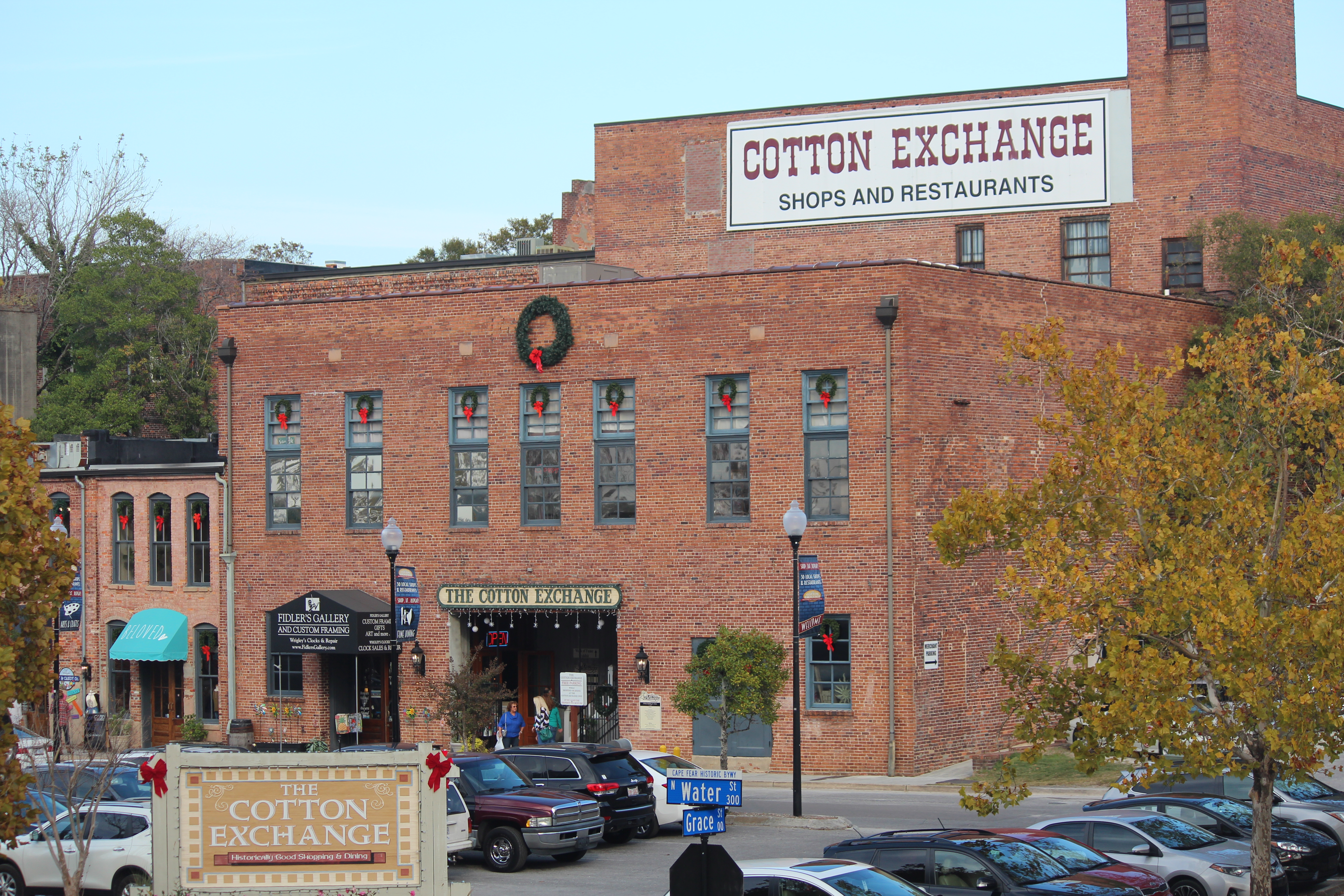
Cotton Exchange of Wilmington

Wilmington's industrial base includes electrical, medical, electronic and telecommunications equipment; clothing and apparel; food processing; paper products; nuclear fuel; and pharmaceuticals. Wilmington is part of North Carolina's Research coast, adjacent to the Research Triangle Park in Durham.

Also important to Wilmington's economy is tourism due to its close proximity to the ocean and vibrant nightlife. Retail areas include the Cotton Exchange of Wilmington and Independence Mall.

Located on the Cape Fear River, which flows into the Atlantic Ocean, Wilmington is a sizable seaport, including private marine terminals and the North Carolina State Ports Authority's Port of Wilmington.

Wilmington is home to the Greater Wilmington Chamber of Commerce, the oldest Chamber in North Carolina, organized in 1853. Companies with their headquarters in Wilmington include Live Oak Bank.

=== Top employers ===
According to the city's 2023 Comprehensive Annual Financial Report, the top employers in the city are:

#	Employer	Employees
1	Novant Health	8,581
2	New Hanover County Schools	3,702
3	University of North Carolina Wilmington	2,236
4	New Hanover County	1,982
5	GE Vernova Hitachi Nuclear Energy	1,888
6	Thermo Fisher Scientific (PPD)	1,800
7	City of Wilmington	1,116
8	Cape Fear Community College	1,083
9	Corning	1,000
10	Wilmington Health	1,000

== Arts and culture ==
=== Performing arts ===
The city supports a very active calendar with its showcase theater, Thalian Hall, hosting about 250 events annually. The complex has been in continuous operation since it opened in 1858 and houses three performance venues, the Main Stage, the Grand Ballroom, and the Studio Theater.

The Hannah Block Historic USO/Community Arts Center, 120 South Second Street in the Wilmington Historic District, is a multiuse facility owned by the City of Wilmington and managed by the Thalian Association, the Official Community Theater of North Carolina. Here, five studios are available to nonprofit organizations for theatrical performances, rehearsals, musicals, recitals and art classes. For more than half a century, the Hannah Block Historic USO Building has facilitated the coming together of generations, providing children with programs that challenge them creatively, and enhance the quality of life for residents throughout the region.

The Hannah Block Second Street Stage is home to the Thalian Association Children's Theater. It is one of the main attractions at the Hannah Block Community Arts Center. The theater seats 200 and is used as a performance venue by community theater groups and other entertainment productions.

The University of North Carolina at Wilmington College of Arts and Science departments of Theatre, Music and Art share a state-of-the-art, $34 million Cultural Arts Building, which opened in December 2006. The production area consists of a music recital hall, art gallery, and two theaters. Sponsored events include 4 theater productions a year.

The Brooklyn Arts Center at St. Andrews is a 125-year-old building on the corner of North 4th Street and Campbell Street in downtown Wilmington. The Brooklyn Arts Center at Saint Andrews (BAC) is on the National Register of Historic Places. The BAC is used for weddings, concerts, fundraisers, art shows, vintage flea markets, and other community-driven events.

Wilmington is home to the Wilmington Conservatory of Fine Arts, a studio for foundlings. The Wilmington Conservatory of Fine Arts is the only studio in the region to offer Progressing Ballet Technique instruction from two certified instructors. The Conservatory is also host to Turning Pointe Dance Company, a faith-based dance company, which performs artistic pieces such as "Pinocchio" for the Wilmington Community.

=== Film and television series ===
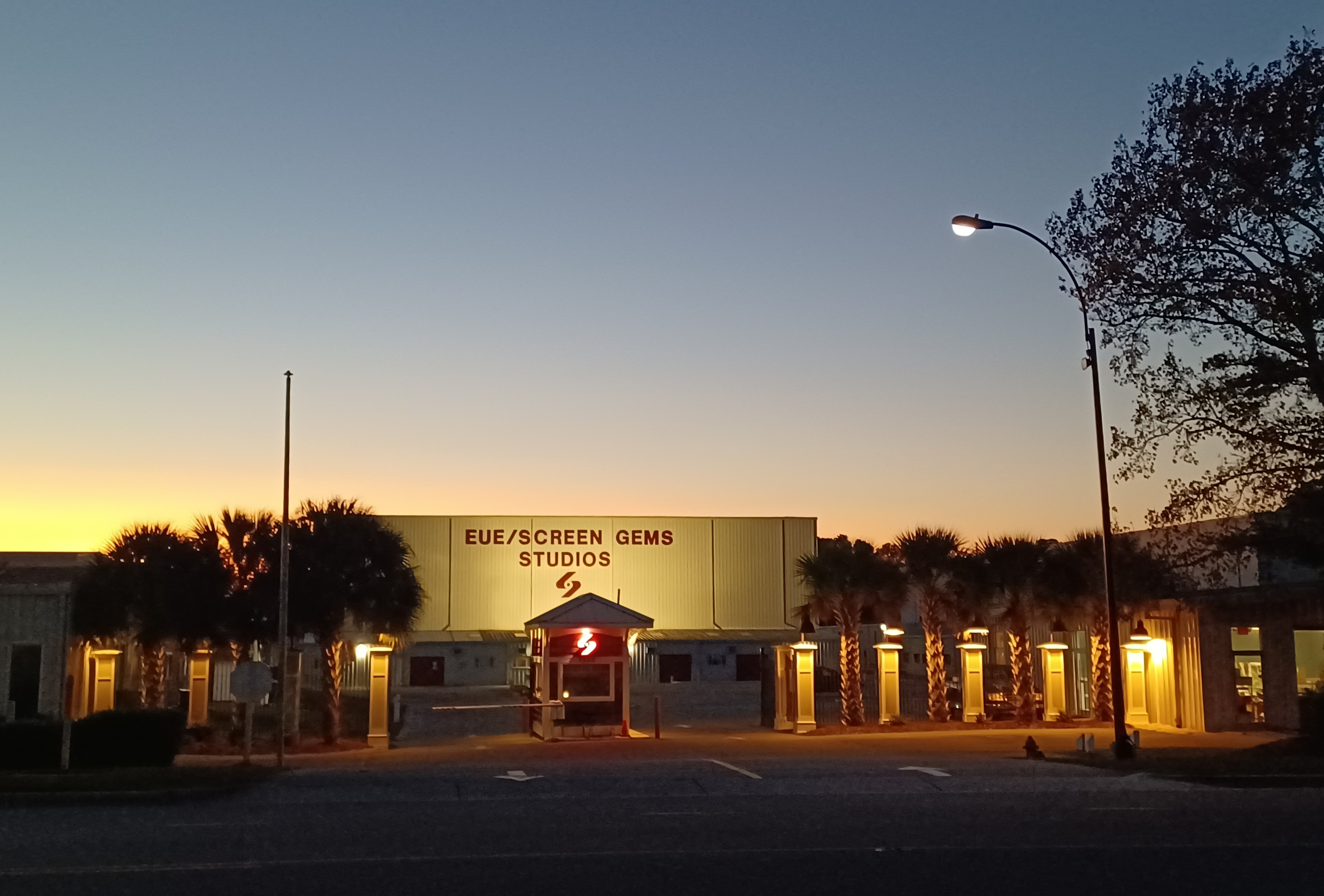
EUE/Screen Gems Studios (now Cinespace Wilmington) in November 2022

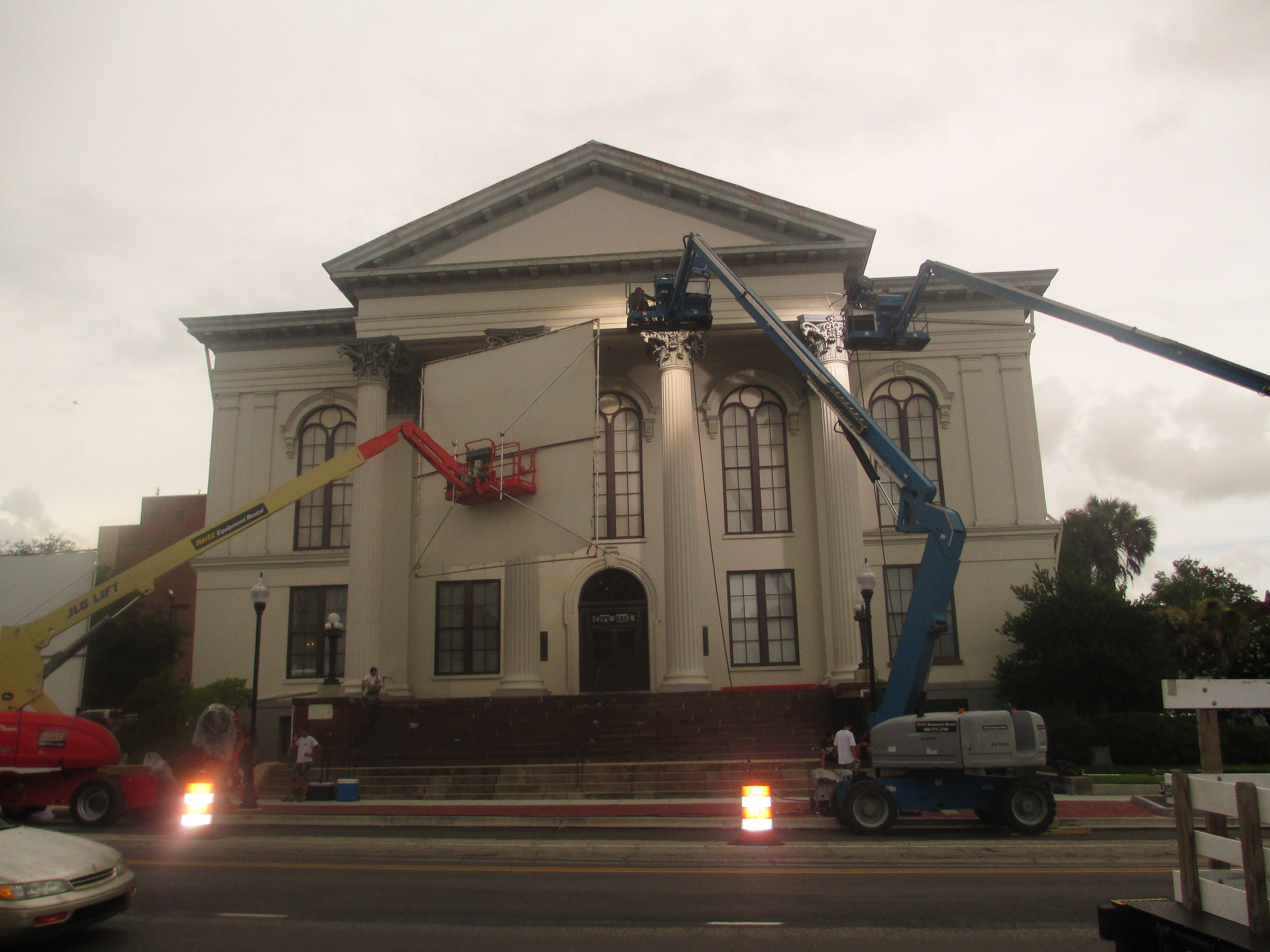
Thalian Hall, with movie crews filming in July 2012

Wilmington is home to Cinespace Wilmington. The city's prominent place in cinema throughout the 1980s and 1990s earned the city the moniker "Hollywood East". Popular television series like Matlock (1986–1995), Dawson's Creek (1998–2003), One Tree Hill (2003–2012), Eastbound & Down (2009–2013), Sleepy Hollow (2013–2017), Under the Dome (2013–2015), Outer Banks (2020–present), and The Summer I Turned Pretty (2022–present) were partially or fully filmed at the studio complex and on location throughout the city. Movies partially or fully shot in or near Wilmington include Firestarter (1984), Blue Velvet (1986), Maximum Overdrive (1986), Weekend at Bernie's (1989), Teenage Mutant Ninja Turtles (1990), Super Mario Bros. (1993), Radioland Murders (1994), The Crow (1994), I Know What You Did Last Summer (1997), The Conjuring (2013), Iron Man 3 (2013), Safe Haven (2013), We're the Millers (2013), The Black Phone (2021), Halloween Kills (2021), and Scream (2022). Actor Brandon Lee was killed after an accidental shooting during the filming of The Crow.

Since 1995, Wilmington annually hosts Cucalorus, an independent film festival. It is the keystone event of The Cucalorus Film Foundation, a non-profit organization. The Foundation also sponsors weekly screenings, several short documentary projects, and the annual Kids Festival, with hands on film-making workshops.

The Cape Fear Independent Film Network also hosts a film festival annually, and the Wilmington Jewish Film Festival also takes place yearly. For several years Wilmington was also the location of fan conventions for One Tree Hill, reuniting the cast and drawing tourists to the city.

In 2014, Governor Pat McCrory decided not to renew the film incentives, which ended up taking a massive toll on not just Wilmington's but North Carolina's entire film industry. As a result, most productions and film businesses moved to other cities, especially to Atlanta, Georgia. For the years following, were many attempts to bring the industry back to North Carolina via the North Carolina Film and Entertainment Grant. This grant designates $31 million per fiscal year (July 1 – June 30) in film incentives.

In the early 2020s, after the COVID-19 lockdowns and changes to state legislation, filming in the city began to increase again, with 2021 being the biggest year to date for both the city's film industry as well as the whole film industry at large in North Carolina.

In 2022, Dark Horse Studios—which became Wilmington's second film studio in 2020—planned a 20-million-dollar expansion to their studio complex in Wilmington, set to be complete in 2024.

On September 27, 2023, Cinespace Studios announced it had purchased the EUE/Screen Gems Studios location in Wilmington.

=== Literature ===
Birthplace of Johnson Jones Hooper (1815–1862), Author of the Simon Suggs Series.

Birthplace of Robert Ruark (1915–1965)

Now rare, an early edition of the Scottish poet Robert Burns's "Poems, Chiefly in the Scottish Dialect" was printed by Bonsal and Niles of Market Street, Baltimore in 1804.

=== Music ===
Chamber Music Wilmington was founded in 1995 and presents its four-concert "Simply Classical" series every season. The concerts are performed by world-class chamber musicians and are held at UNCW's Beckwith Recital Hall.

The Wilmington Symphony Orchestra was established in 1971 and offers throughout the year a series of five classical performances, and a Free Family Concert.

One of the largest DIY festivals, the Wilmington Exchange Festival, occurs over a period of five days around Memorial Day each year.

Beginning in 1980, the North Carolina Jazz Festival is an annual three-day traditional jazz festival that features world-renowned jazz musicians.

The Cape Fear Blues Society is a driving force behind blues music in Wilmington. The organization manages, staffs and sponsors weekly Cape Fear Blues Jams and the annual Cape Fear Blues Challenge talent competition (winners travel to Memphis, Tennessee, for the International Blues Challenge). Its largest endeavor is the Cape Fear Blues Festival, an annual celebration that showcases local, regional and national touring blues artists performing at a variety of events and venues, including the Cape Fear Blues Cruise, Blues Workshops, an All-Day Blues Jam, and numerous live club shows. Membership in the CFBS is open to listeners and musicians alike.

=== Museums and historic sites ===
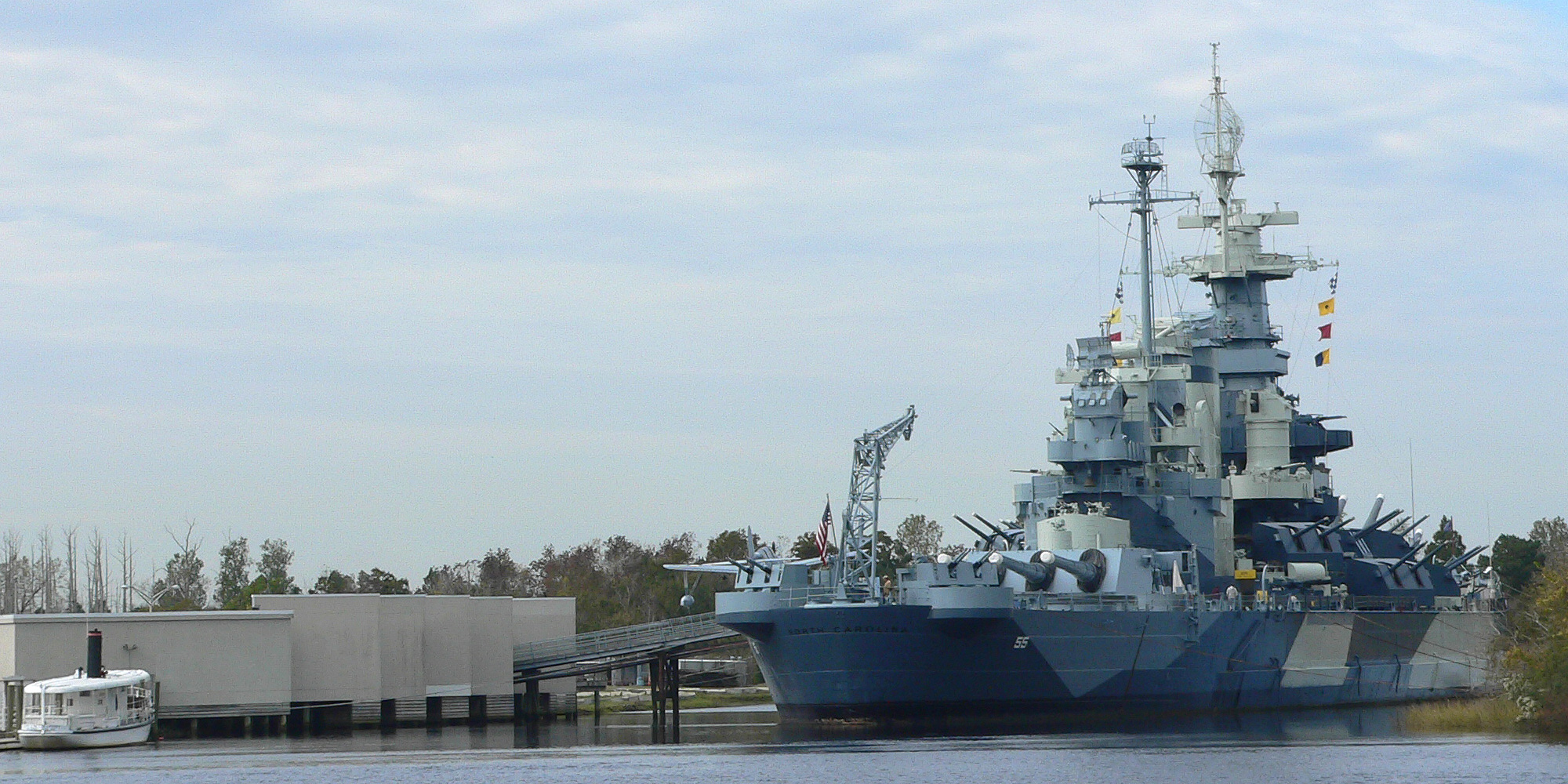
The USS North Carolina Battleship Memorial, seen from downtown Wilmington, across the Cape Fear River

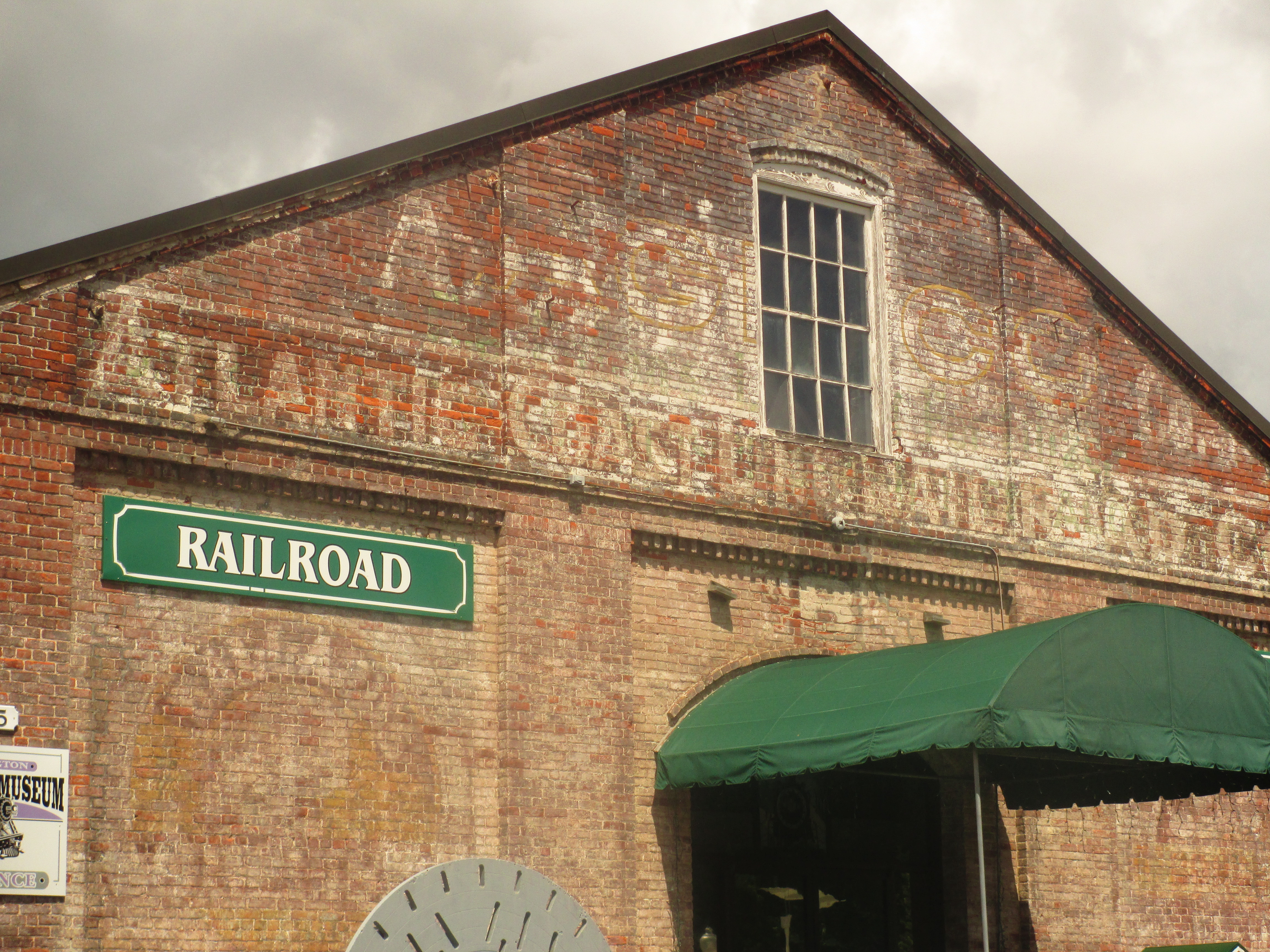
The Railroad Museum is located behind the Hilton Hotel.

- Bellamy Mansion Museum of History & Design Arts
- Cameron Art Museum
- Cape Fear Museum of History and Science
- The Children's Museum of Wilmington
- First Baptist Church, founded in 1808
- First Presbyterian Church, historic Presbyterian church
- Grace United Methodist Church, founded in 1797
- Hannah Block Historic USO/Community Arts Center
- Latimer House Museum and Gardens
- St. James Episcopal Church, oldest church in Wilmington
- St. Mary Catholic Church, historic Roman Catholic church in Wilmington
- Sunset Park Historic District
- Temple of Israel, oldest synagogue in North Carolina
- USS North Carolina Memorial
- Wilmington Railroad Museum

The Second and Orange Street USO Club was erected by the Army Corps of Engineers at a cost of $80,000. Along with an identical structure on Nixon Street for African-American servicemen, it opened in December 1941, the same month that the Japanese attacked Pearl Harbor. From 1941 to 1945, the USO hosted 35,000 uniformed visitors a week. Recently renovated with sensitivity to its historic character, the Hannah Block Historic USO (HBHUSO) lobby serves as a museum where World War II memorabilia and other artifacts are displayed. The building itself was rededicated in Ms. Block's name in 2006 and restored to its 1943 wartime character in 2008. The building is listed in the National Register of Historic Places. The World War II Wilmington Home Front Heritage Coalition, an all volunteer 501(c)(3) preservation organization, is the de facto preservationist of the building's history and maintains the home front museum.

=== Festivals ===
Wilmington is host to many annual festivals, including, most notably, the Azalea Festival. The Azalea Festival, sponsored by the Cape Fear Garden Club, features a garden tour, historic home tour, garden party, musical performances, a parade, and a fireworks show. It takes places every year in April.

== Sports ==
Club	League	Venue	Founded	Titles
Wilmington Sharks	CPL, Baseball	Buck Hardee Field at Legion Stadium	1997	2
Wilmington Hammerheads (Note: Disbanded in 2017. All operations were moved to its youth team, Wilmington Hammerheads Youth FC.)	USL, Soccer	Legion Stadium	1996	1
Wilmington Sea Dawgs	TRBL, Basketball	Wilmington YMCA	2006	0

The Wilmington Sharks are a Coastal Plain League (CPL) baseball team in Wilmington that was founded in 1997 and was among the charter organizations when the CPL was formed that same year. The roster is made up of top collegiate baseball players fine-tuning their skills using wood bats to prepare for professional baseball. Their stadium is located at Buck Hardee Field at Legion Stadium.

The Wilmington Sea Dawgs are a Tobacco Road Basketball League (TRBL) team that began its inaugural season with the American Basketball Association (ABA) in November 2006 and have also played in the Premier Basketball League, and the Continental Basketball League.

The Wilmington Hammerheads were a professional soccer team based in Wilmington. They were founded in 1996 and played in the United Soccer Leagues Second Division. Their stadium was Legion Stadium, however, UNCW Soccer Stadium for their 2017 season. After the 2009 season, the USL discontinued their relationship with the franchise owner Chuck Sullivan. The Hammerheads franchise returned in 2011, but was disbanded again in 2017. Currently, the organization only manages its youth team under the name Wilmington Hammerheads Youth FC.

The University of North Carolina Wilmington sponsors 19 intercollegiate sports and has held Division 1 membership in the NCAA since 1977. UNCW competes in the Colonial Athletic Association and has been a member since 1984.

The University of North Carolina Wilmington is also home to the Seamen Ultimate Frisbee team. The team won the National Championship in 1993 and most recently qualified for the USA Ultimate College Nationals tournament in 2014

The Cape Fear Rugby Football Club is an amateur rugby club playing in USA Rugby South Division II. They were founded in 1974 and hosts the annual Cape Fear Sevens Tournament held over July 4 weekend; hosting teams from all over the world. They own their own rugby pitch located at 21st and Chestnut St.

Off and on, from 1900 to 2001, Wilmington has been home to a professional minor league baseball team. The Wilmington Pirates, a Cincinnati Reds farm team, were one of the top clubs in the Tobacco State League from 1946–50. Most recently the Wilmington Waves, a Class A affiliate of the Los Angeles Dodgers, played in the South Atlantic League. Former All Star catcher Jason Varitek played for Wilmington's Port City Roosters in 1995 and 1996. In 1914 the Philadelphia Phillies held spring training in Wilmington.

The beach near Wilmington, NC is home to the annual O’Neil/Sweetwater Pro-Am and Music Festival, the second-largest surfing contest on the East Coast.

== Government ==
Wilmington adopted a council–manager form of government in 1941.

== Education ==
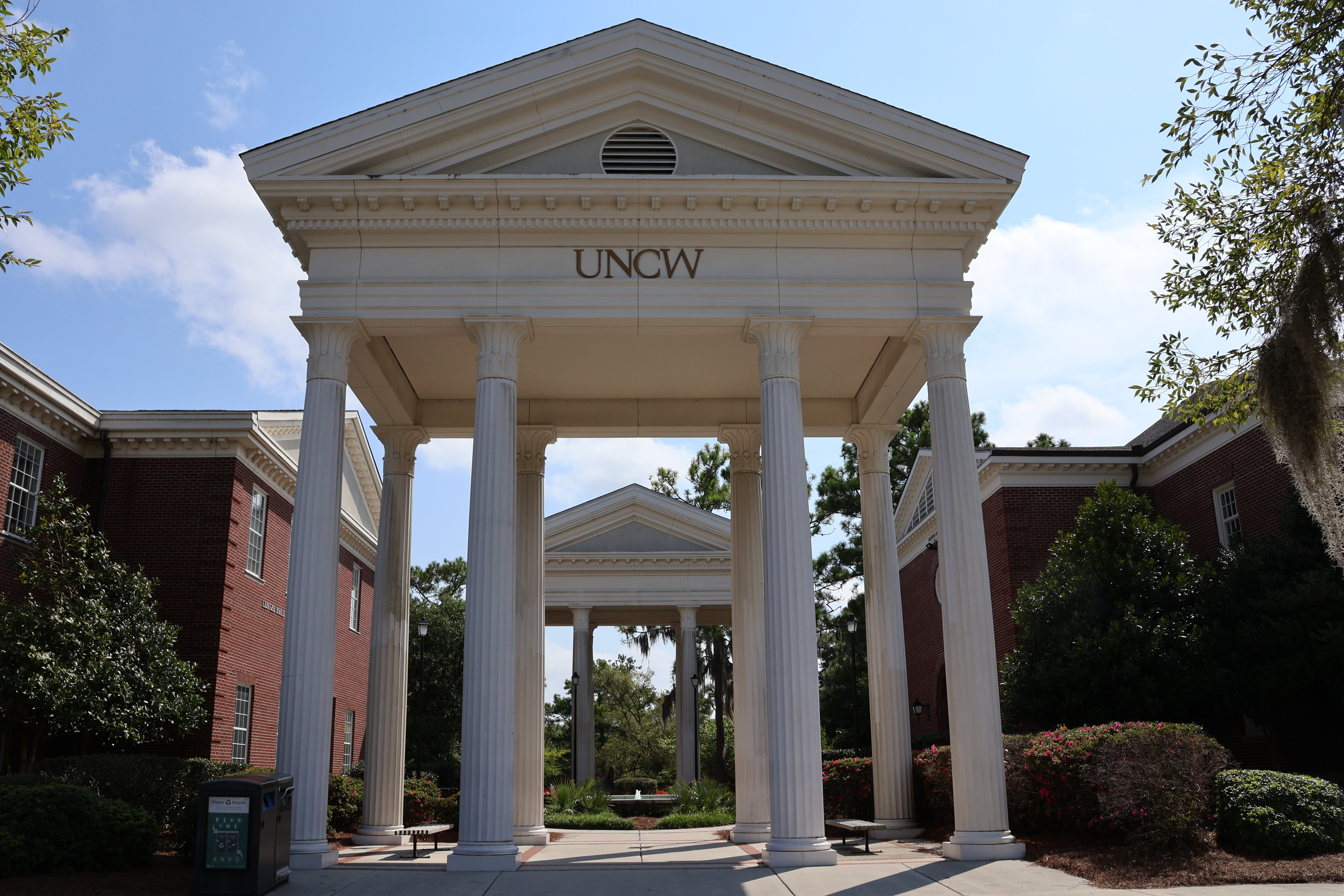
Arches on the campus of the University of North Carolina Wilmington

=== Universities and colleges ===
- University of North Carolina at Wilmington
- Cape Fear Community College
- Shaw University (satellite campus)
- University of Mount Olive (satellite campus)
- University of North Carolina at Pembroke (satellite campus)
- Miller-Motte Technical College

=== Schools ===
Public schools in Wilmington are operated by the New Hanover County School System. Public high schools in the city include Emsley A. Laney High School, Eugene Ashley High School, Girls’ Leadership Academy (GLOW), Isaac Bear Early College High School, John T. Hoggard High School, Mosley Performance Learning Center, New Hanover High School, and Wilmington Early College High School.

Wilmington also has numerous private schools, including Cape Fear Academy, St. Mark Catholic School, and the Wilmington Academy of Arts and Sciences.

== Media ==
=== Newspapers ===
The Star-News is Wilmington's daily newspaper; read widely throughout the Lower Cape Fear region and now owned by Gannett, following its merger with the Star's previous owner, GateHouse Media. A daily online newspaper, Port City Daily, is owned by Local Daily Media. Two historically black newspapers are distributed and published weekly: The Wilmington Journal and The Challenger Newspapers. Encore Magazine is a weekly arts and entertainment publication.

=== Broadcast radio ===
==== AM ====
- 630 AM WMFD – Sports ("ESPN Radio, AM 630")
- 1340 AM WLSG – Regional Mexican ("La Raza 94.1")

==== FM ====
- 89.7 FM WDVV – Worship & Praise Music ("The Dove, 89.7")
- 90.5 FM WWIL-FM – Christian Music ("Life 90.5")
- 91.3 FM WHQR – Public Radio
- 93.1 FM WBPL-LP – Wilmington Catholic Radio
- 94.1 FM W231CL Regional Mexican ("La Raza 94.1") (WLSG translator)
- 95.5 FM W238AV – Contemporary Christian ("K-LOVE")
- 95.9 FM W240AS – Soft AC ("95.9 The Breeze") (WKXB translator)
- 97.3 FM WMNX – Hip Hop/R & B ("Coast 97.3")
- 100.5 FM W263BA – Contemporary Christian ("K-LOVE")
- 101.3 FM WWQQ-FM- Country ("Double Q, 101")
- 102.7 FM WGNI – Hot AC ("102.7 GNI")
- 104.5 FM WYHW – Christian Talk ("104.5")

=== Television ===
The Wilmington television market is ranked 130 in the United States, and is the smallest DMA in North Carolina. The broadcast stations are as follows:

- WWAY, Channel 3, (ABC affiliate, with CBS on 3.2 and CW on 3.3): licensed to Wilmington, owned by Morris Multimedia
- WECT, Channel 6, (NBC affiliate): licensed to Wilmington, owned by Gray Television
- WILM-LD, Channel 10, (Independent station): licensed to Wilmington, owned by the Capitol Broadcasting Company
- WSFX-TV, Channel 26, (Fox affiliate): licensed to Wilmington, owned by American Spirit Media and operated by Gray Television
- WUNJ-TV, Channel 39, (PBS member station, part of the UNC-TV Network)

Cable news station News 14 Carolina also maintains its coastal bureau in Wilmington.

On September 8, 2008, at noon, WWAY, WECT, WSFX, WILM-LP and W51CW all turned off their analog signals, making Wilmington the first market in the nation to go digital-only as part of a test by the Federal Communications Commission (FCC) to iron out transition and reception concerns before the nationwide shutoff. Wilmington was chosen as the test market because the area's digital channel positions will remain unchanged after the transition. As the area's official conduit of emergency information, WUNJ did not participate in the early analog switchoff, and kept their analog signal on until the national digital switchover date of June 12, 2009. W47CK did not participate due to its low-power status; FCC rules currently exempt low-powered stations from the 2009 analog shutdown. WILM-LP and W51CW chose to participate, even though they are exempt as LPTV stations.

Despite Tropical Storm Hanna making landfall southwest of Wilmington two days before (September 6), the switchover continued as scheduled. The ceremony was marked by governmental and television representatives flipping a large switch (marked with the slogan "First in Flight, First in Digital") from analog to digital.

== Transportation ==
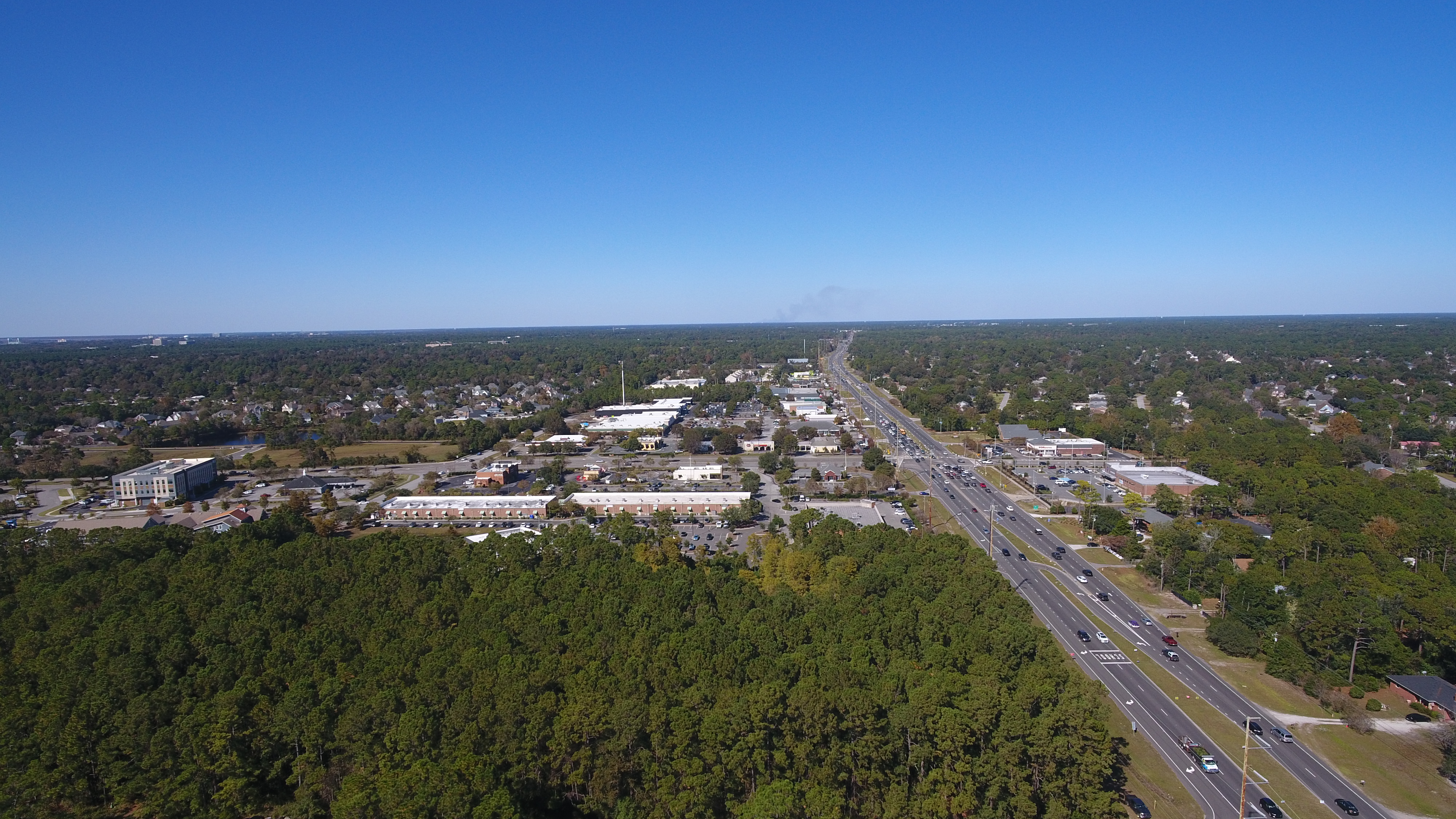
Intersection of South College Road, South 17th Street, and Waltmoor Road from the air

=== Airport ===
Wilmington International Airport (ILM) is the main airport in the region for commercial air service. The airport serves over 1,800,000 travelers per year. It is also home to two fixed-base operators (FBO). The airport maintains a separate international terminal which houses a 24-hour U.S. Customs and Border Protection ramp for international flights (private or charter) wishing to land at ILM.

=== U.S. Routes ===
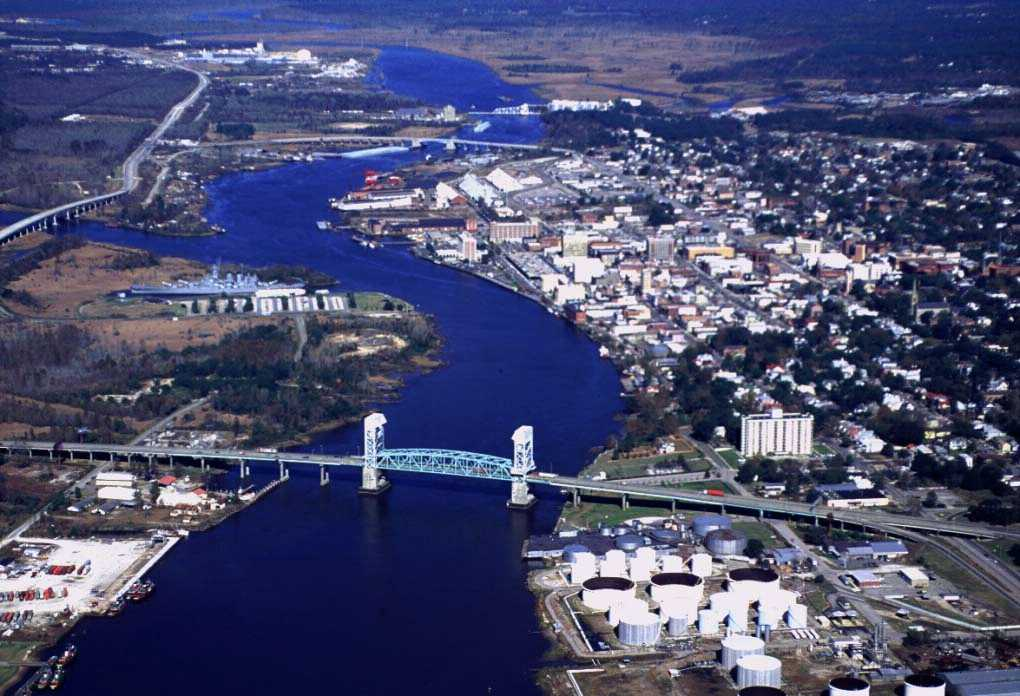
The Cape Fear Memorial Bridge (foreground) carries US 17 Business, US 76 and US 421 across the Cape Fear River

- US 17
- US 17 Bus.
- US 17 Byp. (future Hampstead Bypass)
- US 74
- US 76
- US 117
- US 421
- US 421 Truck

=== North Carolina State Highways ===
- NC 132
- NC 133
- NC 417 (temporary highway designation for US 17 Byp.)

=== Alternative transportation options ===
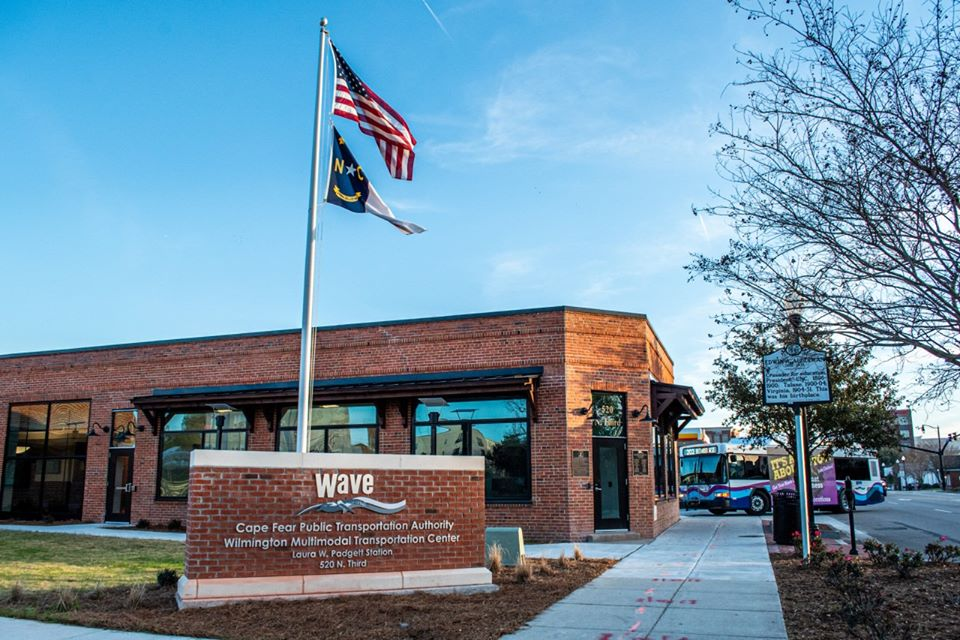
Wilmington Multimodal Transportation Center at 520 North 3rd St.

Public transit in the area is provided by the Cape Fear Public Transportation Authority, which operates fixed bus routes, shuttles, and a free downtown trolley under the brand name Wave Transit. A daily intercity bus service to Raleigh is provided by Greyhound Lines. Wilmington is also served by Amtrak Thruway bus connections to Wilson, North Carolina where connections can be made with Amtrak's Carolinian and Palmetto. The city's Union Station last had passenger train service in 1968 with the Seaboard Coast Line's predecessor version of the Palmetto. The Seaboard Air Line's station last had service in 1958, with a daily train to Charlotte via Hamlet.

The NCDOT Cape Fear Run bicycle route connects Apex to Wilmington and closely parallels the RUSA 600 km brevet route.

The city of Wilmington offers transient docking facilities in the center of downtown Wilmington along the Cape Fear River approximately 12.5 miles (20 km) from the Intracoastal Waterway. The river depth in the run up from the ICW is in excess of 40 feet (12 m). Taxicab services are available from several vendors, however, the City's Taxi Commission keeps meter rates artificially low. In 2021, regulations were eased to help the taxi industry compete with other companies like Uber and Lyft.

The Gary Shell Cross-City Trail is primarily a multi-use trail that provides bicycle and pedestrian access to numerous recreational, cultural and educational destinations in Wilmington. The Gary Shell Cross-City Trail provides bicycle and pedestrian connection from Wade Park, Halyburton Park and Empie Park to the Heide-Trask Drawbridge at the Intracoastal Waterway. It also connects to the River to Sea Bikeway and the under-construction Central College Trail and Greenville Loop Trail.

== Healthcare ==
New Hanover Regional Medical Center is a hospital in Wilmington. It was established in 1967 as a public hospital, and it was the first hospital in the city to admit patients of all races. It was operated by New Hanover County. In February 2021 Novant Health, a nonprofit private organization, acquired the hospital.

== Notable people ==
=== Art and literature ===
- Jock Brandis, author, co-founder of the Full Belly Project
- Wiley Cash, author
- Mark Cox, poet
- Minnie Evans, folk artist
- Barbara Guest, poet and prose stylist
- JG Faherty, author of dark fiction, horror, thrillers, and science fiction
- Tini Howard, comic book writer
- Will Inman, poet
- Sharyn McCrumb, author
- Thomas McKeller, model
- Peggy Payne, writer, journalist, and consultant to writers
- Celia Rivenbark, humor columnist and author
- Robert Ruark, author, syndicated columnist, and big game hunter
- Emily McGary Selinger, painter, writer, poet, and educator
- Betsy Thornton, author

=== Government and politics ===
- Joseph Carter Abbott, colonel in Union Army during American Civil War, Republican senator representing North Carolina from 1868–1871
- John Dillard Bellamy, congressman
- Timothy Bloodworth, teacher and statesmen, elected to the 1st United States Congress
- Jeanne Milliken Bonds, mayor of Knightdale, North Carolina
- Deb Butler, representative for North Carolina's 18th House district
- John Cox, member of the Virginia House of Delegates
- George Davis, politician and lawyer
- Lucien C. Gause, lawyer and politician representing Arkansas
- Eustace Edward Green was a state legislator and educator in the North Carolina and a doctor in Georgia
- Susi Hamilton, Democratic representative for North Carolina's 18th House district
- Lethia Sherman Hankins, African American woman city council member
- Cornelius Harnett, merchant, farmer, and statesman, delegate for North Carolina in the Continental Congress
- William Hooper, delegate for North Carolina in the Continental Congress, signer of the United States Declaration of Independence, deputy attorney general of North Carolina, and federal judge
- John Peter LaFrenz, politician representing New York
- Charles A. McClenahan, member of the Maryland House of Delegates for district 38
- Daniel F. McComas, born in San Juan, Puerto Rico, served as a member of the North Carolina General Assembly, representing New Hanover County in the 13th and 19th House districts
- Harry Payne, state representative and North Carolina Commissioner of Labor
- Duncan K. McRae, attorney, diplomat, and state legislator
- Samuel D. Purviance, represented North Carolina in the United States House of Representatives
- David Rouzer, U.S. representative, former North Carolina state senator
- Bill Saffo, longest serving mayor in Wilmington's history
- John Sampson, politician before and after the American Colonial era
- John Patterson Sampson, American abolitionist, newspaper publisher, writer, lawyer, judge, and minister
- Carson Smith, Republican member of the North Carolina House of Representatives for the 16th district, previously served as sheriff to Pender County, North Carolina
- Charles Manly Stedman, politician and lawyer
- William Francis Strudwick, early U.S. congressman between serving 1796 and 1797
- James Thorington, lawyer, judge, and one term U.S. representative for Iowa's 2nd congressional district
- Lara Trump, daughter-in-law of President Donald Trump and Co-Chair of the Republican National Committee.
- Alfred Moore Waddell, lawyer, politician, and publisher
- Garland H. White, preacher and politician who served as chaplain for the 28th United States Colored Infantry Regiment
- Woodrow Wilson, 28th president of the United States

=== Media and entertainment ===
- Barnacle Boi, electronic music producer, vocalist, and visual artist
- David Brinkley, television newscaster for NBC and ABC
- Cliff Cash, stand-up comedian
- Charlie Daniels, country music legend, inducted into the Grand Ole Opry and the Country Music Hall of Fame.
- Sammy Davis Sr., dancer and father of entertainer Sammy Davis Jr.
- Maddie Hasson, actress, best known for her role as Willa Monday on the short lived Fox television series The Finder
- Johnson J. Hooper, 19th century humorist
- Caterina Jarboro, first black opera singer ever to sing on an opera stage in America. In 1999, she was inducted into the Wilmington Walk of Fame.
- Charles Kuralt, award-winning journalist
- Jane McNeill, stage, film, and television actress
- Don Payne, writer and producer
- Sha-Rock (Sharon Green), rapper and MC, considered the "first female rapper"
- Willis Richardson, playwright
- James Wall, stage manager and actor

=== Military ===
- Edwin Anderson Jr., Medal of Honor recipient
- Eugene Ashley Jr., Medal of Honor recipient
- Arthur Bluethenthal, football player and World War I pilot
- William D. Halyburton Jr., Medal of Honor recipient
- Joseph McNeil, member of the Greensboro Four during Civil rights movement, and former major general in the U.S. Air Force
- Charles P. Murray Jr., Medal of Honor recipient
- Ilario Pantano, United States Marine
- William Gordon Rutherfurd, commanded HMS Swiftsure during the Battle of Trafalgar
- Ted Sampley, Vietnam veteran and POW-MIA activist
- John Steele, paratrooper; subject of the film The Longest Day
- John Ancrum Winslow, officer in the United States Navy during the Mexican–American War and American Civil War

=== Sports ===
- Kadeem Allen, basketball player in the NBA and currently for Hapoel Haifa in the Israeli Basketball Premier League
- Marvin Allen, UNC Chapel Hill soccer coach
- Wright Anderson, Elon University football coach
- Reggie Barnes, former pro-skateboarder and owner of Eastern Skateboard Supply
- Connor Barth, NFL kicker
- Nick Becton, NFL offensive tackle
- Sam Bowens, MLB outfielder
- Derek Brunson, UFC fighter
- Jonathan Cooper, NFL offensive guard
- Alge Crumpler, NFL tight end
- Hoss Ellington, NASCAR driver
- Roman Gabriel, former NFL quarterback and NFL Most Valuable Player winner
- Kenny Gattison, former NBA player
- Althea Gibson, professional tennis player, golfer, and member of the International Tennis Hall of Fame
- Tyrell Godwin, MLB outfielder
- Alex Highsmith, NFL linebacker for the Pittsburgh Steelers
- Keever Jankovich, former NFL player
- Sam Jones, former NBA player and member of the Basketball Hall of Fame
- Kitwana Jones, former CFL defensive end
- Michael Jordan, former NBA player and member of the Basketball Hall of Fame
- Sonny Jurgensen, former NFL quarterback and member of the Pro Football Hall of Fame
- Clarence Kea, professional basketball player
- Meadowlark Lemon, former Harlem Globetrotter and member of the Basketball Hall of Fame
- Sugar Ray Leonard, professional boxer, Olympic gold medalist at 1976 Summer Olympics, member of the International Boxing Hall of Fame
- Quinton McCracken, MLB outfielder
- Teana Miller, WNBA player
- Rodney Moore, professional boxer
- Ron Musselman, MLB pitcher
- Trot Nixon, MLB outfielder
- Jim Norton, NFL defensive lineman
- Pat Ogrin, NFL defensive tackle
- Sam Pellom, NBA player
- Saniya Rivers, WNBA player
- Jackie Rogers, NASCAR driver
- Jay Ross, NFL nose guard
- Robert Ruark, sportsman and syndicated writer
- Sonny Siaki, professional wrestler
- Charles Sinek, competitive ice dancer
- Harvest Smith, professional basketball player
- Willie Stargell, MLB outfielder and first baseman, member of the Baseball Hall of Fame
- Ross Tomaselli, professional soccer player
- Ty Walker, professional basketball player
- Tamera "Ty" Young, WNBA player

=== Other notables ===
- Julia Dalton, Miss North Carolina USA 2015
- Kristen Dalton, Miss North Carolina USA 2009 & Miss USA 2009
- John Walcott Kay, physician and hospital founder
- Sarah Graham Kenan, philanthropist
- Charles J. Mendelsohn, cryptographer and classicist
- Samuel Mendelsohn, Lithuanian Jewish rabbi and scholar
- Louis T. Moore, preservationist, author, historian, photographer, and civic promoter
- Eliza Hall Nutt Parsley, founder of the North Carolina Division of the United Daughters of the Confederacy
- Thomas Peters, early founder of Sierra Leone
- Fred Pickler, actor, author, and photographer
- Fr. Thomas Price, first native Catholic priest of North Carolina
- James Francis Shober, first professionally trained Black physician in North Carolina
- Robert Robinson Taylor, American architect
- David Walker, Black abolitionist
- Anna McNeill Whistler, mother of painter James McNeill Whistler
- Amy Wright, CNN Hero of the Year 2017

== Sister cities ==
Wilmington is a sister city with the following cities:

- Dandong, Liaoning, China—1986
- / Doncaster, South Yorkshire, United Kingdom—1989
- Bridgetown, Barbados—2004
- San Pedro Town, Belize—2007

== See also ==
- List of municipalities in North Carolina
- Gregory Normal School
