= Federal Point Light =

Lighthouse in North Carolina, US

- Location: Kure Beach, North Carolina

Tower
- Constructed: 1866
- Foundation: Piers
- Shape: Cottage

Light
- Deactivated: ca. 1879; No longer in existence

Federal Point Light was a lighthouse at Federal Point near Kure Beach in New Hanover County, North Carolina. It was an active light from about 1866 to around 1879.

Federal Point Light was on the inland side on the southern end of Pleasure Island, which is a barrier island. It was near Fort Fisher and North Carolina Aquarium at Fort Fisher and Kure Beach.

== History ==
One or more lighthouses were built at Federal Point prior to the Civil War. A light tower was destroyed by Confederate troops in early 1860s.

After a new inlet opened south of Federal Point, a new lighthouse was constructed in 1866. It was a cottage-style lighthouse on piers. The light was extinguished in 1879 or 1881. A rock seawall, eventually known as "The Rocks" was built in 1881 to close the inlet. The lighthouse burned in 1881.
