= Military Ocean Terminal Sunny Point =

American military facility

Coordinates: 34.007135°N 77.975979°W

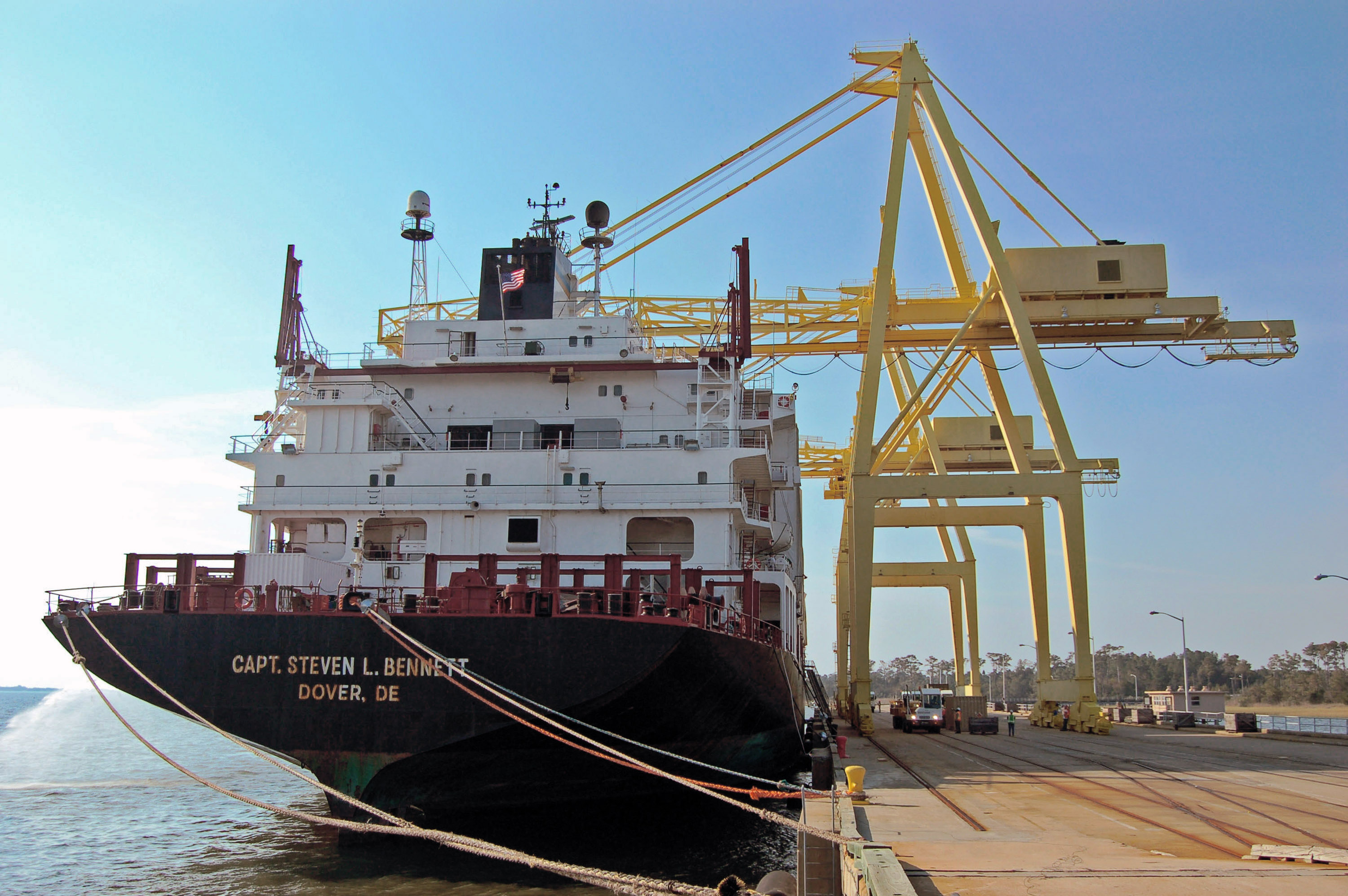
The MV Capt. Steven L. Bennett at the Military Ocean Terminal Sunny Point, N.C.

Military Ocean Terminal Sunny Point (MOTSU) is one of the largest military terminals in the world. It serves as a transfer point between rail, trucks, and ships for the import and export of weapons, ammunition, explosives and military equipment for the United States Army and is operated by the 596th Transportation Brigade.

== Facility description ==
The terminal lies between the small town of Boiling Spring Lakes, North Carolina, and the Cape Fear River a few miles upstream of Fort Johnston (North Carolina) and the small city of Southport, North Carolina.

Built in 1951 and opened in 1955, the facility is situated on an Army-owned 8,500-acre (34 km^{2}) site on the banks of the Cape Fear River in Brunswick and New Hanover counties of North Carolina approximately 16 miles (26 km) south of Wilmington, North Carolina. An additional 2,100 acres (8.5 km^{2}) was set aside on Pleasure Island (location of Carolina, Kure, and Fort Fisher beaches) as a buffer zone around the facility.

The terminal is not an open post and access is restricted. The wharfs are also restricted and not accessible to the public (no landing or docking). The Cape Fear River directly in front of the wharfs is restricted and non-military traffic is restricted to transit only (no anchoring).

The port can handle up to 6 ships simultaneously and features large cranes for loading and unloading vessels. A network of 62 miles (100 km) of railroad tracks move munitions and supplies around the facility.

== History ==
The earliest known use of the area dates to 1725 when George Burrington operated a plantation following his first term as colonial governor of the then Province of North Carolina. It later was known as Snows Point when owned by rice planter Robert Snow. During the Civil War, the area hosted an artillery battery protecting the Cape Fear River. Its isolation, few structures and access to deep water made it an ideal location as an ammunition transfer point. Sunny Point military logistics center was built in 1951 and opened in 1955.

The port has transferred munitions to every major armed conflict since it was established. The facility was especially active during the Vietnam War with up to six ships being simultaneously loaded. 466,000 tons of cargo was transferred through MOTSU during the Persian Gulf War.

== See also ==
- Surface Deployment and Distribution Command
- Military Ocean Terminal
