= Pleasure Island (North Carolina) =

Coastal barrier island in North Carolina

Coordinates: 34.0187°N 77.9061°W

Pleasure Island is a coastal barrier island in Southeastern North Carolina, United States, just south of the City of Wilmington. Pleasure Island is located within Federal Point Township, in New Hanover County. The coastal resort towns of Carolina Beach and Kure Beach, as well as the annexed communities of Wilmington Beach and Hanby Beach are located on the island. The southern end of Pleasure Island was separated from Bald Head Island (Smith Island) by Corncake Inlet (New Inlet) until the inlet was shoaled and closed in 1998 by Hurricane Bonnie; thus Pleasure Island and Bald Head Island are no longer separate islands.

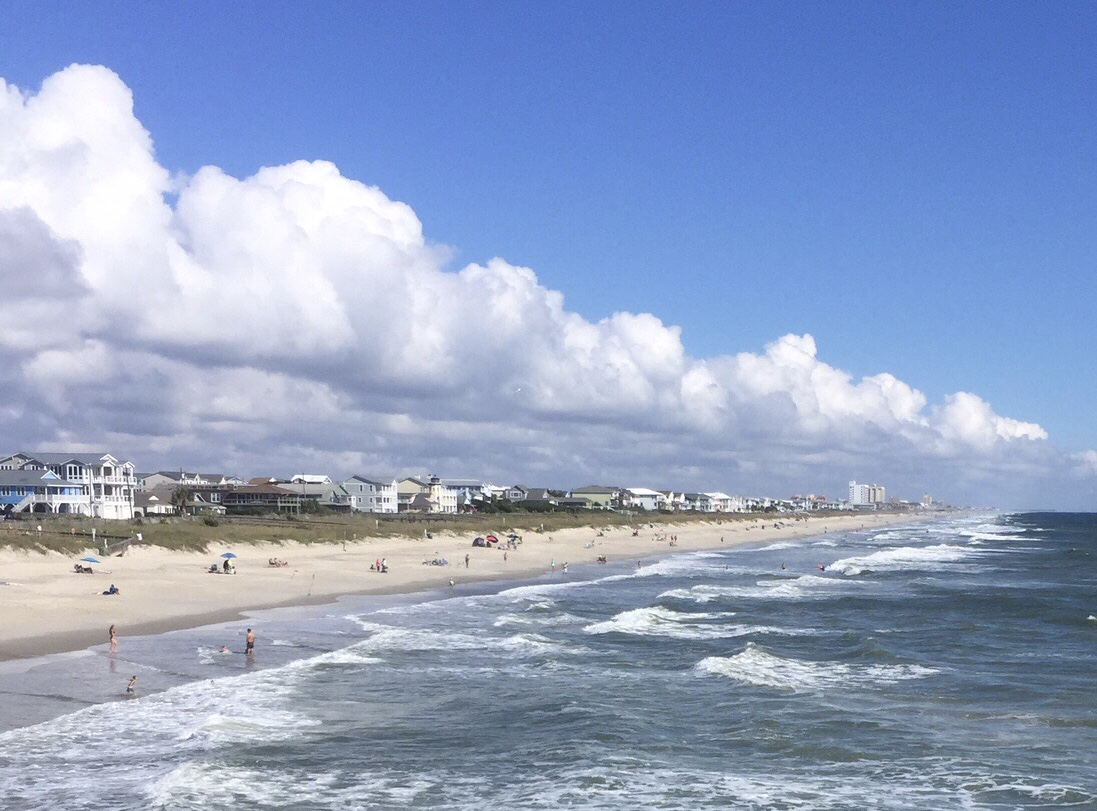
A view of the long strand at Kure Beach (on Pleasure Island) looking north towards Carolina Beach

The combined island now stretches from Carolina Beach Inlet in the north, the Cape Fear River to the west, Onslow Bay (Atlantic Ocean) to the east and Long Bay (Atlantic Ocean) to the south. It is 17 miles long, 2 miles wide in the far north, 3 miles wide at the far south and about ½ mile wide in the middle. On the southeastern tip of the combined island lies "the point", or headland, known as Cape Fear. The shallow and treacherous Frying Pan Shoals jut 30 miles into the Atlantic Ocean southeasterly from the point. The shoal (or sandbar) is formed by the intersection of the longshore currents of Onslow Bay and Long Bay as well as the discharge from the Cape Fear River.

Pleasure Island refers to the northern half of the combined island (the portion in New Hanover County) and Bald Head Island refers to the southern half of the combined island (the portion in Brunswick County).

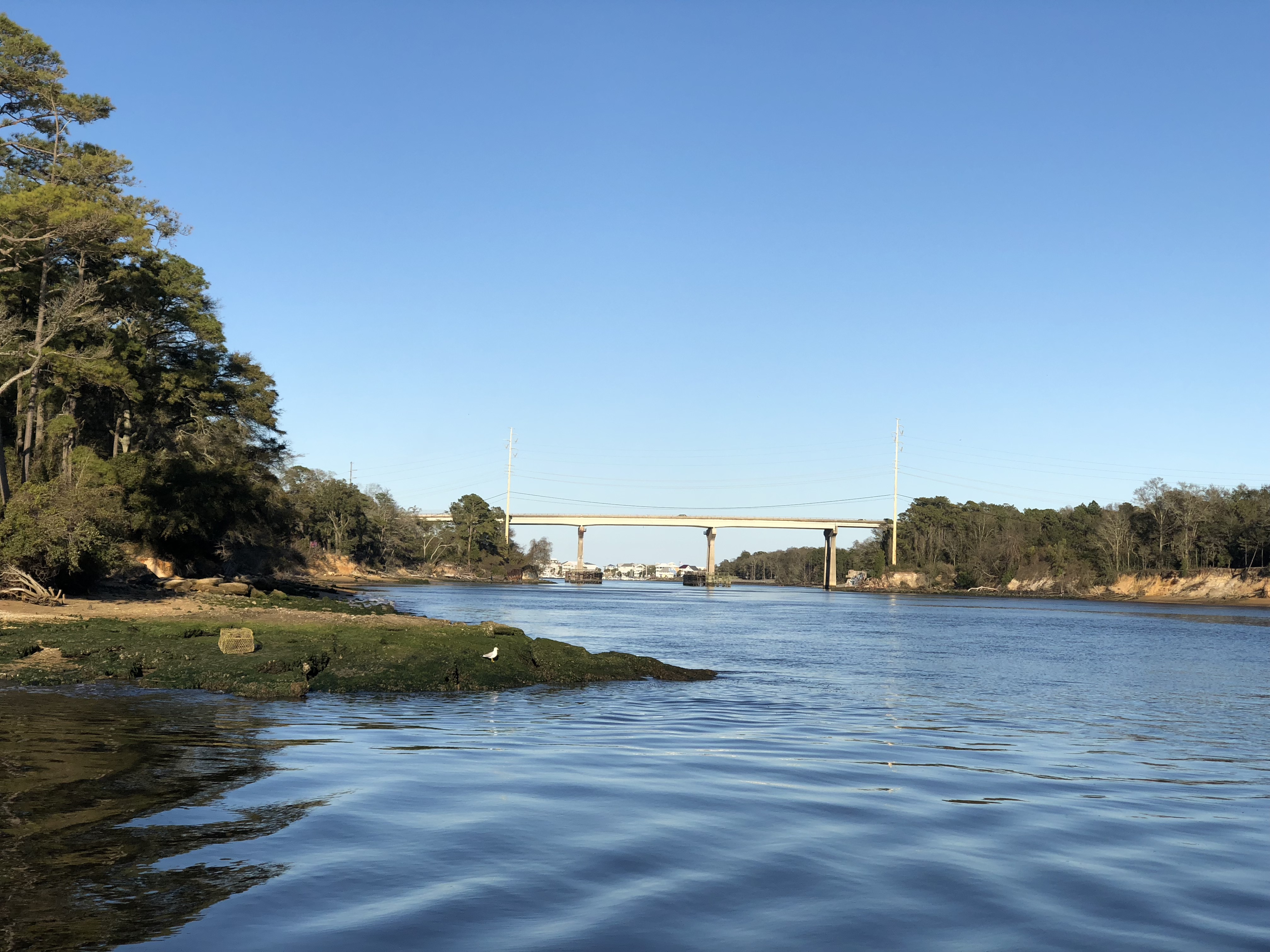
Snows Cut (facing east) makes up the northern boundary of Pleasure Island. The rock pile in the foreground is only noticeable at low tide.

Prior to the 1931 completion of a man-made canal called Snows Cut, the land that now forms Pleasure Island was part of a peninsula known as Federal Point, a long narrow strip of sandy ground that stretched from Myrtle Grove to Fort Fisher. The Federal Point Light once stood at southern end of the peninsula at the edge of New Inlet.

U.S. Highway 421 provides the only bridge access to Pleasure Island. A ferry at the southern terminus of Route 421 at Fort Fisher connects Pleasure Island to Southport, NC at (North Carolina Highway 211). A separate ferry from Southport brings travelers and supplies to Bald Head Island to the south. There are no roads between the two halves of the combined island, but park ranger vehicles, fat-tire bike riders and pedestrians can traverse the beach strand to make the connection as needed.

Pleasure Island is home to an unusual 11-acre fresh water lake that was once the headwater of Myrtle Grove Sound. It is spring fed and less than 200 yards from the salty waters of the Atlantic Ocean. The lake was formerly known as "The Freshwater Lake" but is now called "Carolina Beach Lake".

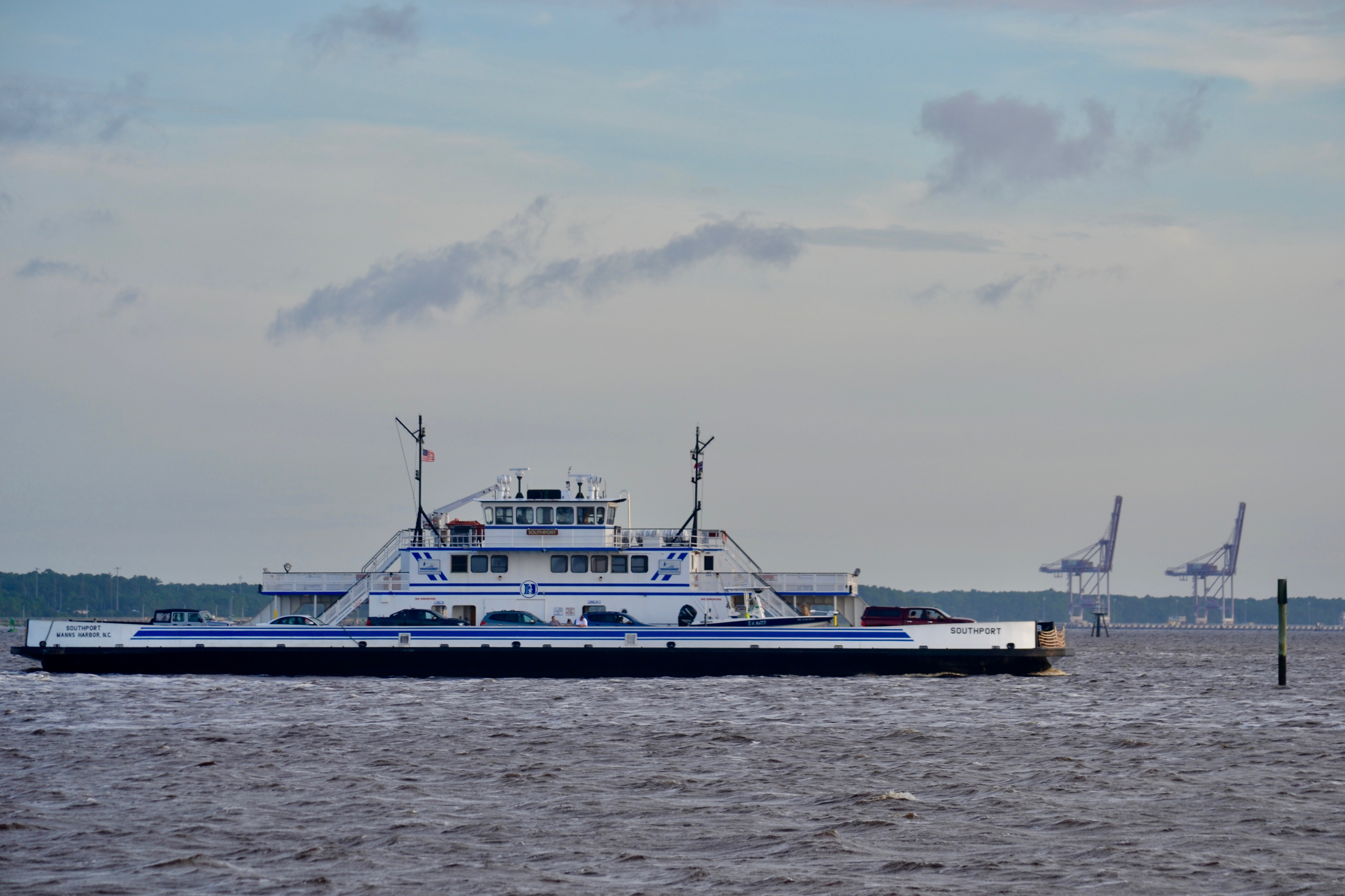
The Fort Fisher Ferry crosses the Cape Fear River returning from Southport.The cranes in the background are part of the US Army's Military Ocean Terminal Sunny Point (MOTSU) in Brunswick County.

The name "Pleasure Island" was the product of a marketing effort by the local Chambers of Commerce back in 1972. They thought Pleasure Island was a positive way to refer to the coastal resources of the area.

Pleasure Island is now part of a 20-mile, unbroken strand of sandy beach stretching from Carolina Beach Inlet, 7 miles south to New Hanover/Brunswick County line, 10 more miles south to the Cape and then 3 miles west to the mouth of the Cape Fear River.

== History ==
=== Geography ===
The area that is now Pleasure Island has gone through a variety of changes over the last few hundred years to end up with its current shape, extending from the Carolina Beach Inlet to Cape Fear.

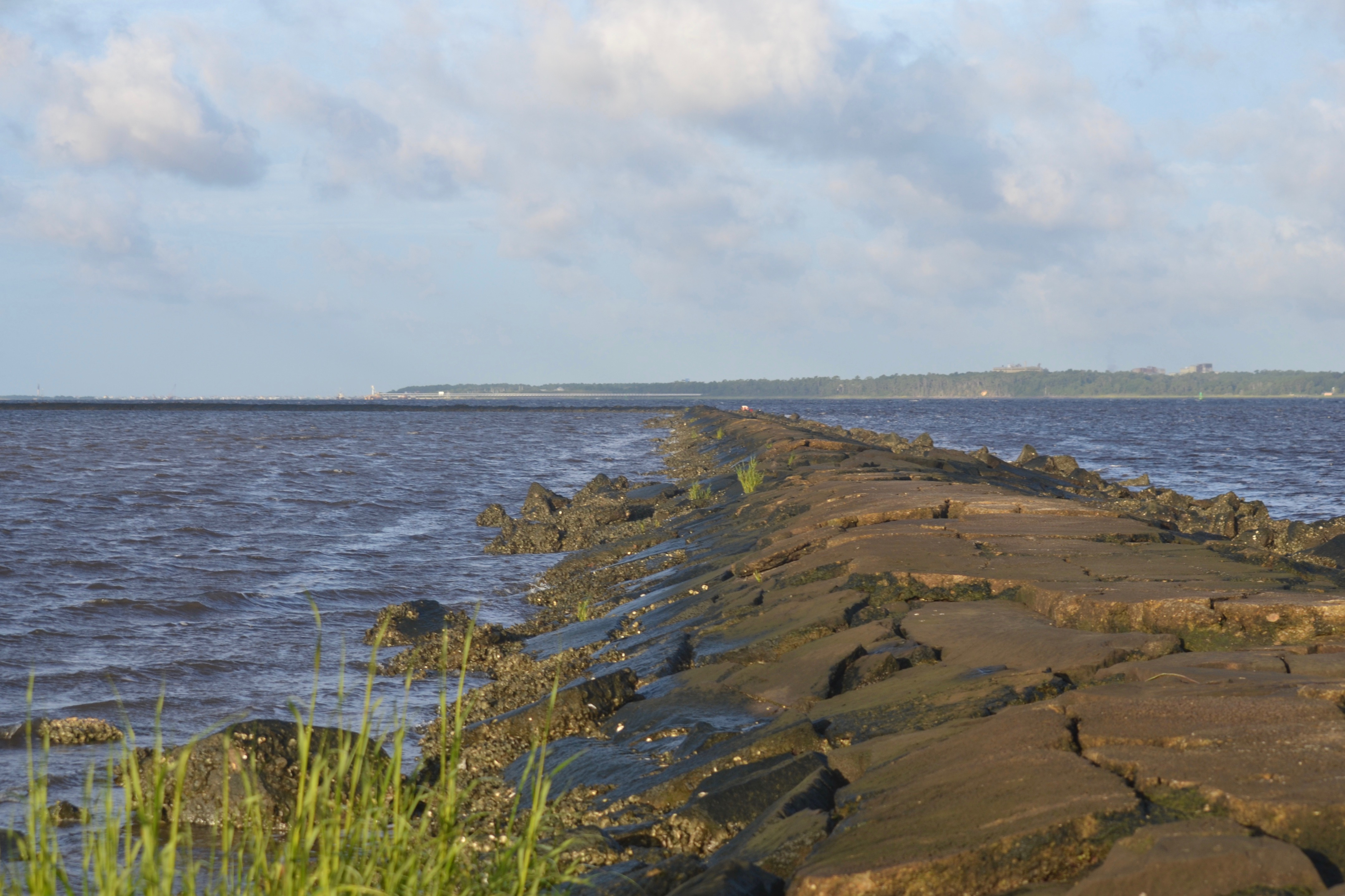
"The Rocks", facing south, with the Cape Fear River in the background. The land in the distance is Brunswick County.

The "island" started out as the lower tip of the Federal Point Peninsula which was originally bounded in the south at a break in the barrier islands called New Inlet. This inlet was "new" in that it opened up as a result of a massive storm in September, 1761. For the decades that followed, New Inlet was actually the preferred entrance to the Cape Fear River for ships bound for the port of Wilmington, as it offered a deeper, shorter, and less treacherous route compared to the Bald Head/Old Inlet Channel, at the mouth of the Cape Fear. During the Civil War, blockade runners routinely took the New Inlet route, which led to the building of Confederate Fort Fisher at this location. There are still dozens of sunken blockade runners in this region of North Carolina.

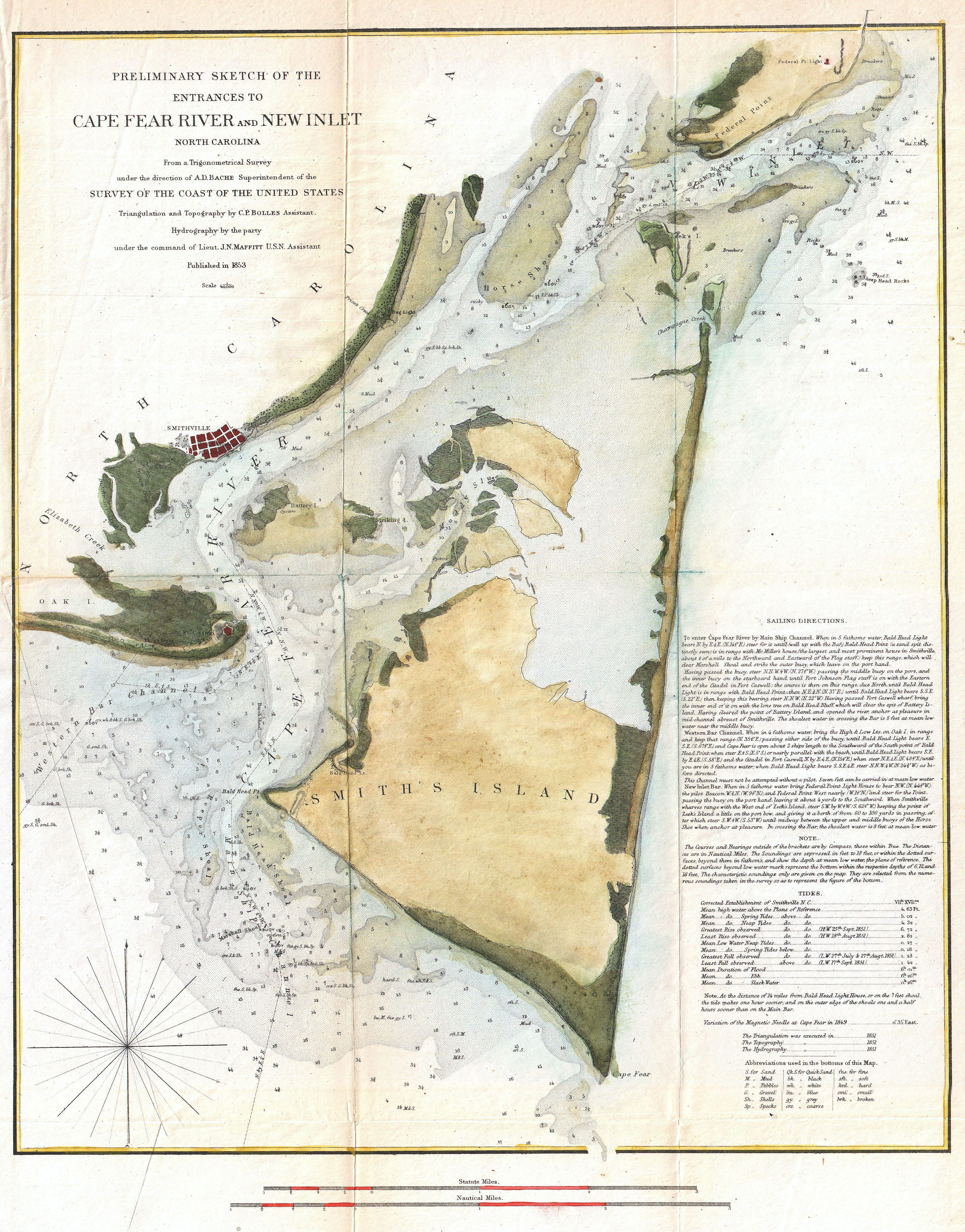
Historic 1853 Map of Smith Island (Bald Head Island) showing New Inlet

After the Civil War, reduced water flow in the river (caused by water escaping through the New Inlet) threatened the main shipping channel that led up from the mouth of the Cape Fear River to Wilmington. To protect access to the port, the United States Army Corps of Engineers built a 1-mile long stone dam, eventually known as "The Rocks", between Zeke's Island and the southern tip of Federal Point. The work took place between 1870 and 1881, and eventually closed off New Inlet's direct access to the Cape Fear River. The enclosed area behind the dam is now known as "The Basin". A second dam, known then as "The Swash Defense", extended "The Rocks" from Zeke's Island south for another 2 miles. These were massive rock moving and engineering efforts, costing over $1M in 1880's money. After the building of the two rock dams, only smaller boats and skiffs could travel from the ocean into the meandering creeks behind Smith Island to access the Cape Fear River. However, for all intents and purposes, the inlet was closed.

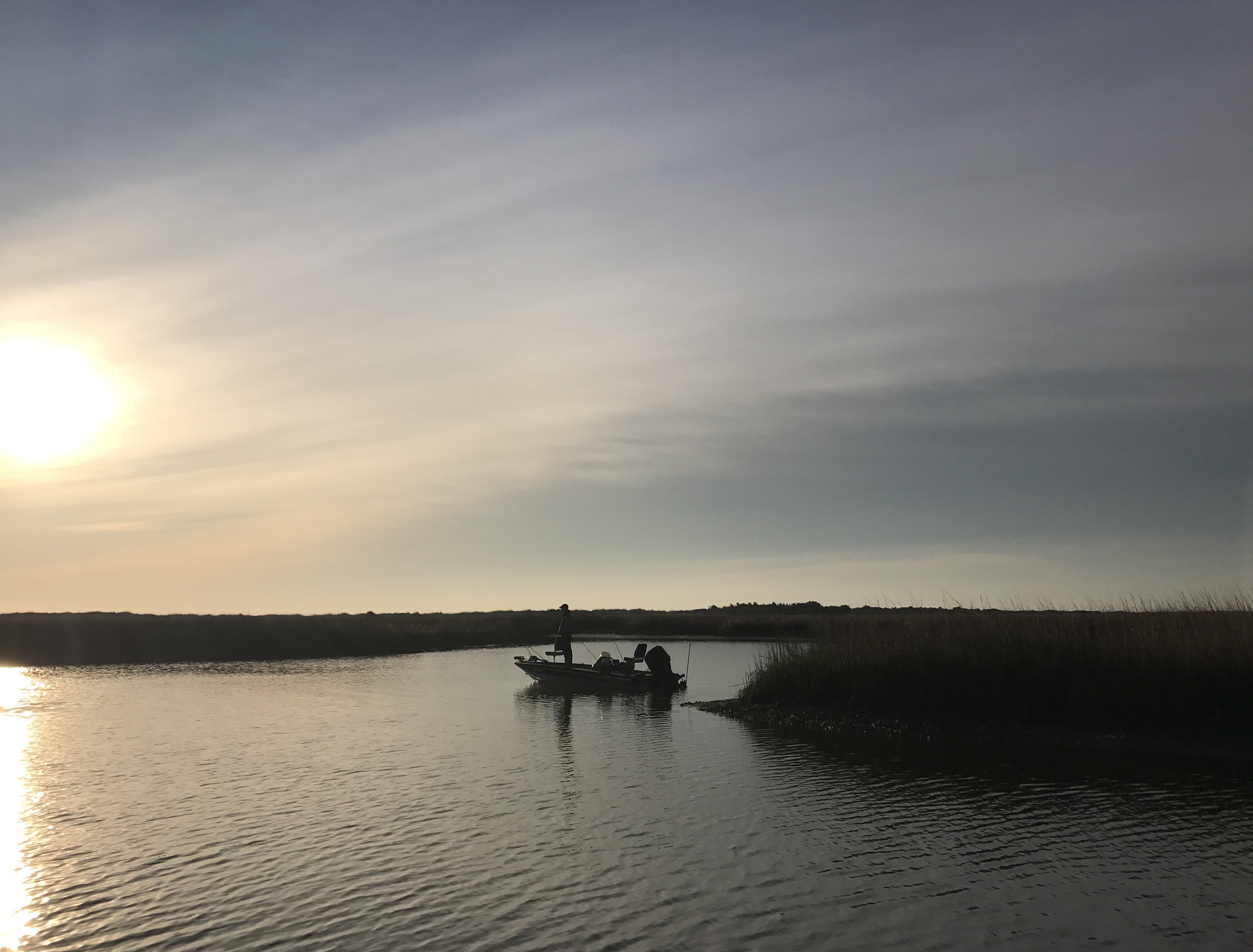
The creeks behind Smith Island, just south of Zeke's Island

New Inlet was then allowed to fill in naturally and soon Gold Leaf Inlet just to the south, was the only major division between Federal Point and Smith Island. Maps from the time also show Corncake Inlet, an inlet that opened between the ocean and Buzzards Bay further to the south. In 1933 Corncake Inlet silted over and maps from 1944 began to show Gold Leaf Inlet renamed to the old name of Corncake Inlet. By the 1960s the inlet was once again renamed to New Inlet (or New Inlet II). Regardless of name, these shallower inlets could still be used by smaller vessels as a way to slip out from the creeks into the sea. This "new" New Inlet made up the southern boundary of Federal Point for many years.

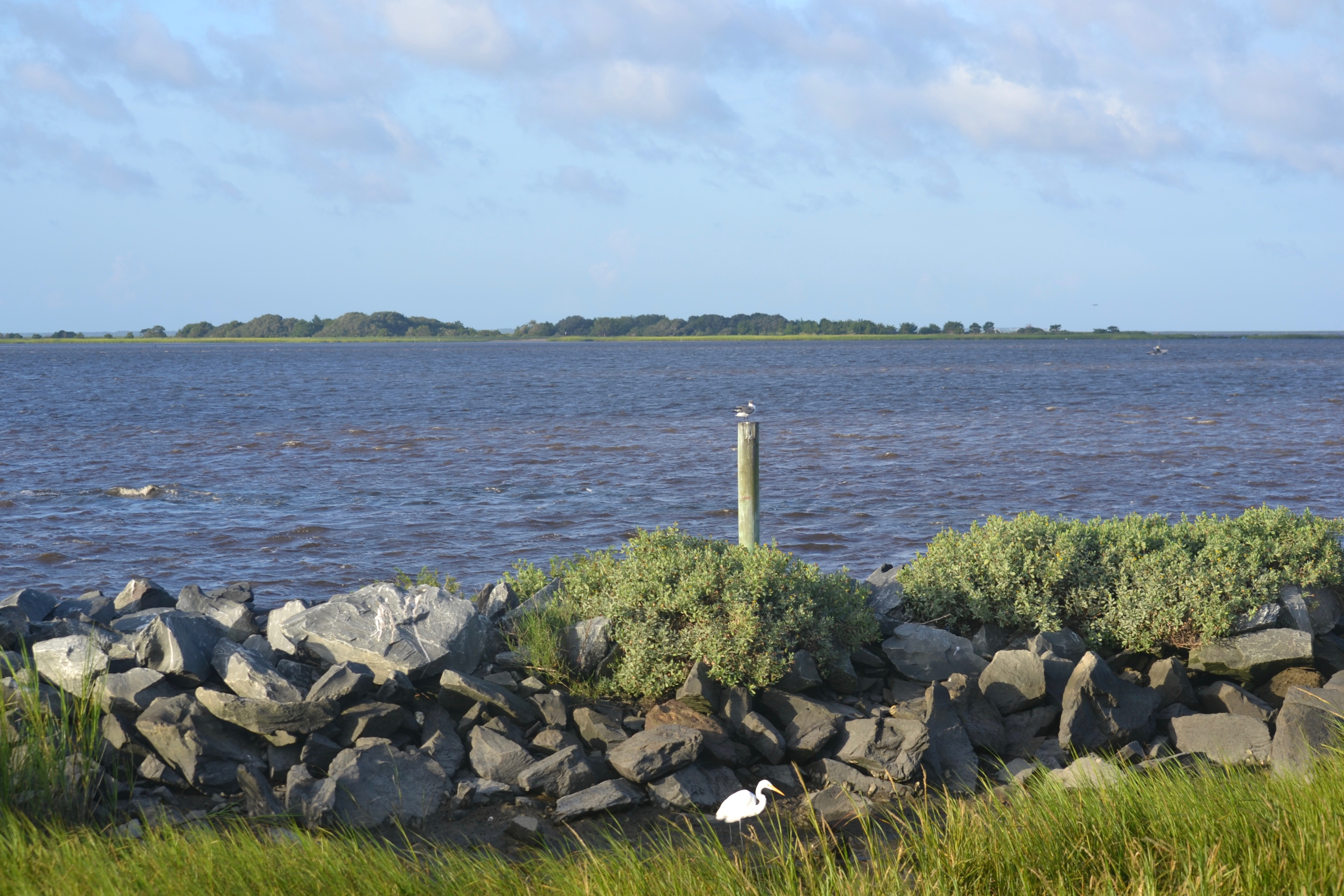
An egret (foreground) fishing near the Basin, with Zeke's Island in the background

In 1930, Snows Cut was dug out (roughly along the line of the lower portion of Telfair Creek) connecting the Cape Fear River to Myrtle Grove Sound and officially turning the tip of the Federal Point peninsula into a barrier island. The man-made canal, 1.75 miles long, and originally 100 feet wide and 12 feet deep, was named after Major William A. Snow. Snow was the district engineer with the U.S. Army Corps of Engineers who supervised the $5 million dredging work. Snows Cut was, and still is, an important part of the Intracoastal Waterway as it allows boats to avoid the treacherous Frying Pan Shoals, which extend some 30 miles into the ocean off Cape Fear. Cars could originally cross over Snows Cut via a small wooden bridge until a swing bridge was added. This remained in use until the present-day concrete high-rise bridge opened in 1962.

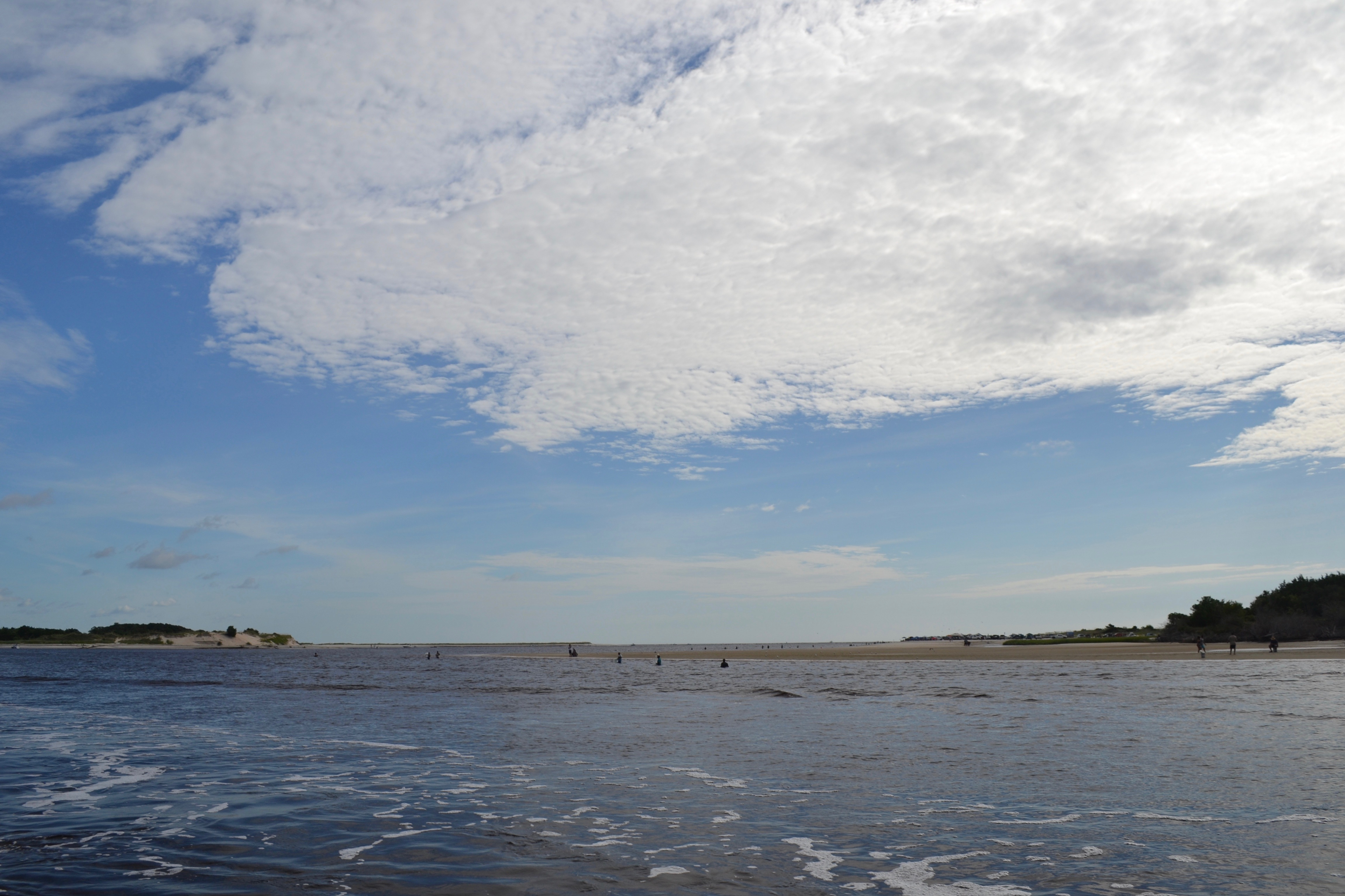
A view of the Carolina Beach Inlet at low tide, facing east from the Intracoastal Waterway. The men to the center-right are casting throw nets for mullet. Masonboro Island is the high bluff to the left and Freeman Park is in the distance on the right.

Prior to the 1950s, the north end of Carolina Beach (today's Freeman Park) was connected to what is now the south end of Masonboro Island. This meant that the closest navigable inlet for boats moored at the Carolina Beach docks was Masonboro, some 10 miles to the north. In 1952, a group of influential local businessmen got together and hired a dredge to dig out what is now Carolina Beach Inlet. Local captain Skippy Winner piloted the first commercial vessel to pass through the inlet.

The shape of the island remained relatively constant for the next 45 years, with Corncake Inlet (the inlet that was later renamed New Inlet), in the south, slowly silting up. In 1998, Hurricane Bonnie pushed large quantities of sand into the inlet and finally closed it off. Pleasure Island and Smith Island (Bald Head Island) were combined as one and remain that way today.

=== The People of the Lower Cape Fear ===
Federal Point was historically home to small groups of Native Americans, but much heavier concentrations, perhaps numbering into the thousands, lived on the west side of the river or upstream. History has forgotten the names of these tribes so they are generally referred to as the Cape Fear Indians. It was argued they spoke a Siouan language although their language is unattested. The tribes called the lower Cape Fear River, "Sapona" and they lived on the abundant forest, river and ocean resources. By the time Europeans arrived in the late fifteenth century, the Native Americans of the region had largely transitioned from hunter-gathering to small-scale agriculture. Various artifacts and oyster mounds have been found on and near Federal Point over the years. One village site was discovered about "1.5 miles south of the head of Myrtle Grove Sound, 3 miles north of Fort Fisher, and less than 100 yards from the beach. Sugar Loaf is less than one mile from this site in a northwesterly direction". This location would be very close to where Carolina Beach Lake sits today.

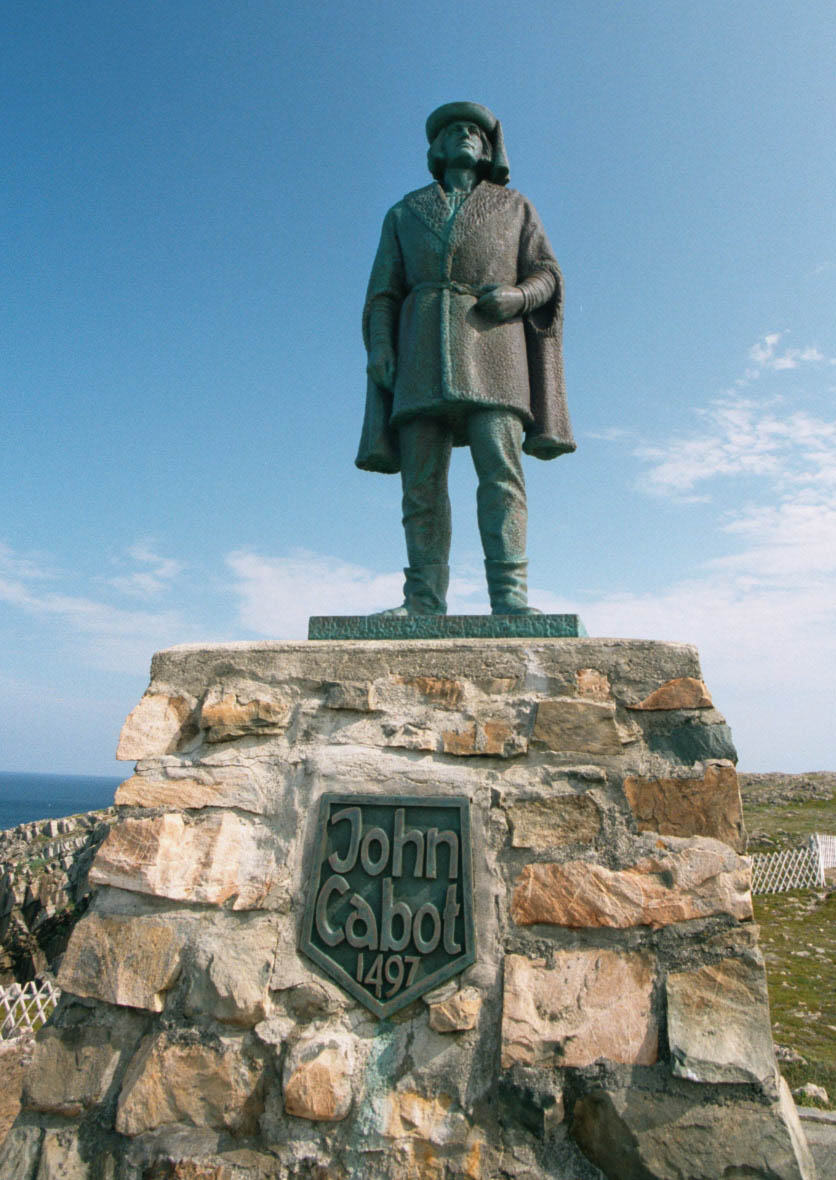
Explorer John Cabot

England laid its European claim to the area that is now the eastern United States (including Federal Point) in 1497 after the first voyage of Venetian John Cabot, who was in the service of King Henry VII.

It is reasonable to think that many Spanish sailors passed by the region as they headed north and east from St. Augustine (Florida) to reach the Gulf Stream. In the early 1520's, Pedro de Quexos wrote of passing through the area of the Cape in the service of his Spanish sponsor Lucas Vázquez de Ayllón who hailed from Santo Domingo on Hispaniola (in present-day Dominican Republic).

In 1524, Giovanni da Verrazzano, a Florentine explorer in the service of the Frances I, King of France, wrote about reaching Cape Fear region on his ship La Dauphine. He talked about seeing smoke from a multitude of native campfires and went ashore to briefly meet with them.

Lucas Vázquez de Ayllón himself came to the Carolinas, and presumably up the Cape Fear River, in 1526 with several hundred settlers on six ships. The Spanish called the Cape Fear River the Jordan River (Rio Jordan) and the greater area "Cape San Romano". Shortly after arriving, Ayllón died of fever attempting to settle in what is now South Carolina. This was the end of any significant moves by Spain to protect their claims to North American lands above Florida.

Several attempts at English colonization in the areas North and South of the Cape Fear region were launched during the ensuing century, notably the failed colony of Roanoke. The Cape Fear area, however, did not see serious attempts at permanent colonization until the 1660s.

In 1650, an Englishman named Edward Bland briefly visited the Cape Fear area. He reported favorably on what he saw and likely encouraged the next wave of settlement.

In 1662, William Hilton Jr., an English captain raised in New England, sailed to the region on his ship Adventure in the service of Puritans from the "heavily-populated" Massachusetts Bay Colony. He spent three weeks exploring the lower reaches of the Cape Fear River, which he renamed the Charles River. Hilton's favorable reports of the area encouraged the adventurers from Massachusetts to quickly assemble and sail south with Hilton in early 1663 in an attempt to tame the area. They created a small settlement along the river, which was only to last a couple months. It was soon abandoned, presumably due to Indian problems or disease, and the colonists' livestock were left behind to roam freely along what is now Bald Head Island. Legend says the party left behind a sign on a tree near the bar at the mouth of the Cape Fear River warning others to not try to settle in the supposedly inhospitable area.

It was around this time that King Charles II granted all of his English lands south of Virginia and north of Spanish-held Florida to his eight Lord Proprietors of Carolina as a reward for their loyalty in restoring him to the English throne after the English Civil War. This gave the Lord Proprietors almost complete control of who could or could not settle in the area. The grant included all of the lands in the Cape Fear region, which they called Clarendon County. The Cape Fear River was therefore renamed as the Clarendon River.

In late 1663, Hilton accompanied another group of English colonists, this time from Barbados and led by John Vassall, who were hoping to settle in the area to escape the overcrowding on the booming eastern Caribbean Island. Vassal hope to petition the Lord Proprietors for a charter to settle the region (after the fact). Others from both New England and Barbados followed until the number of Europeans reportedly reached 800, spread out along the river for some 60 miles. They created the village of "Charles Towne", just north of Indian Creek (today's Town Creek). Much to John Vassall's chagrin, the Lord Proprietors soon appointed the wealthy and well-connected Col. John Yeamans (also from Barbados) to serve as governor of this new Clarendon County, with John Vassall as his second. Yeamans favored settlement further south, down in the Port Royal area, and had the backing of the Lords.

Disputes with the Charles Town settlers, Indian issues, lack of resupply, and other factors soon led Yeamans to head back to Barbados, leaving Vassall in charge. The settlers stayed in the area for the next few years, but more significant conflicts with Indians, an ill-timed hurricane, and concerns of abandonment—after the start of an English war with the Dutch—prompted them to leave by 1667. The settlers evacuated Charles Town and some travelled to other Atlantic Coast settlements, while others returned home to Barbados. This was the end of the troubled Charles Town settlement and the area would remain largely unsettled for several more decades.

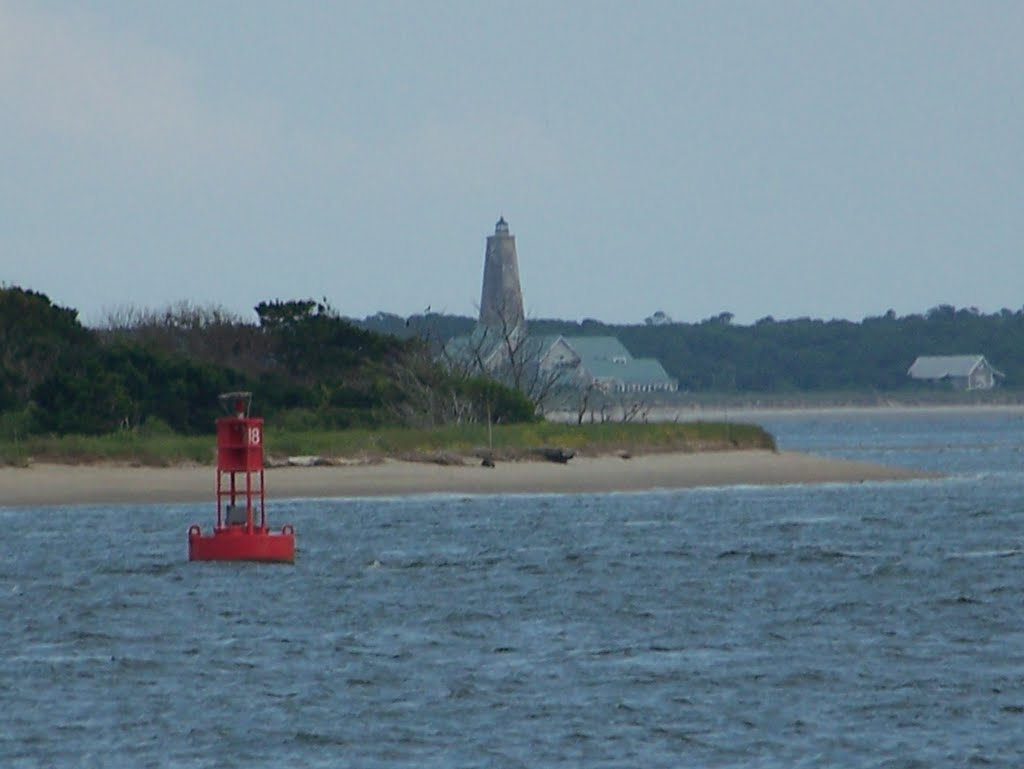
A view of the Bald Head Island and the Old Baldy Lighthouse from the shipping channel in the Cape Fear River

Within a few short years others from Barbados, again led by Col. John Yeamans, would return to the eastern American coast to help realize Yeaman's dream of new "Charleston" near Port Royal, South Carolina, a town that would quickly become a major factor in the region. The Englishmen from this new Charleston continued a brisk trade with the Indians on the Cape Fear River throughout these early years.

In 1710, the Lord Proprietors divided the province of Carolina into North and South on an ambiguous border along the Cape Fear River. In an effort to avoid taxation from the Charleston authorities, one trader known as the second Landgrave Thomas Smith, (son of the former colonial Governor Smith, aka the first Landgrave Thomas Smith) claimed the island lands on the lower east side of the river as part of North Carolina. The North Carolina authorities granted his claim and the area, then known as Cape Island, was renamed Smith Island (today's Bald Head Island). There are no records, however, that show Smith actually visited the island.

European Settlers slowly continued to arrived in the Carolina region which ultimately resulted in the Tuscarora War (1711–1715), which forced the Native Americans further west.

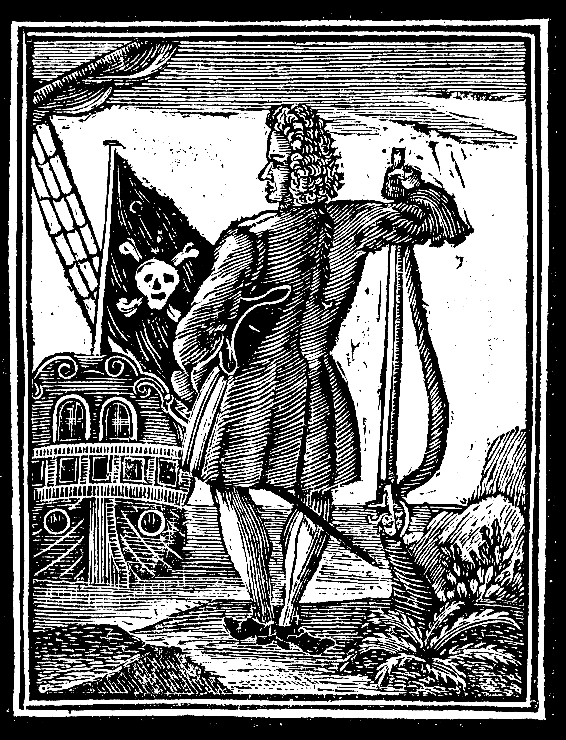
Print engraving of Stede Bonnet in Charles Johnson's A General History of the Pyrates

The area was also frequented by pirates, who would harass ships and the coastline and then slip away behind the many shoals and islands in their relatively shallow-draft boats. One such pirate was Stede Bonnet, who previously traveled with Blackbeard. In 1718, Bonnet was captured on the lower Cape Fear River, near present-day Southport, while he was laid over, repairing his ships and waiting out the hurricane season. The battle between the pirates and the English authorities from South Carolina lasted several hours, with the authorities eventually prevailing. Bonnet was later hanged in Charles Town (Charleston) in South Carolina.

In 1715, Maurice Moore, the son of the Carolina provincial Governor James Moore, crossed the Cape Fear River on his way south from Beaufort on a military mission to aid South Carolina during the Yamasee Indian War. He crossed near the Haulover at the Sugar Loaf (present day Carolina Beach State Park) and landed on the west side of the river at what would eventually become Brunswick Town. He liked the land he saw and eventually petitioned the Lord Proprietors for a grant. In 1725 the new governor, George Burrington, granted several thousand acres of land in that same area to Maurice. In addition to vast lands on the western side of the river, Maurice's holdings included some 3,000 acres on the eastern peninsula near the upper Haulover at Sugar Loaf (essentially all of Pleasure Island and then south to the northern bounds of Smith Island). In 1725, Maurice's brother, Roger Moore (soon to be called "King Roger" due to his immense holdings of slaves and land), moved from the Province of South Carolina to the area by then known as Orton located just below the former Charles Town settlement on the west side of the Cape Fear River. Roger acquired Orton (near today's Orton Point) from his brother and together they founded Brunswick Town one mile to the south. The town was named after King George I, Duke of Brunswick and Lunenburg. Over time the Moore brothers gained control of tens of thousands of acres in the region. Roger built a home at Orton in 1725 that was soon destroyed in an attack by local Native Americans. Roger gathered a group of men and slaves and crossed over the river and attacked the Indians from the north near the Sugar Loaf, in the last major Indian action on the peninsula. Roger rebuilt the Orton house and created Orton Plantation, and specialized in rice growing in the nearby marshes as well as other crops. The rebuilt house has been added onto many times, but still stands today.

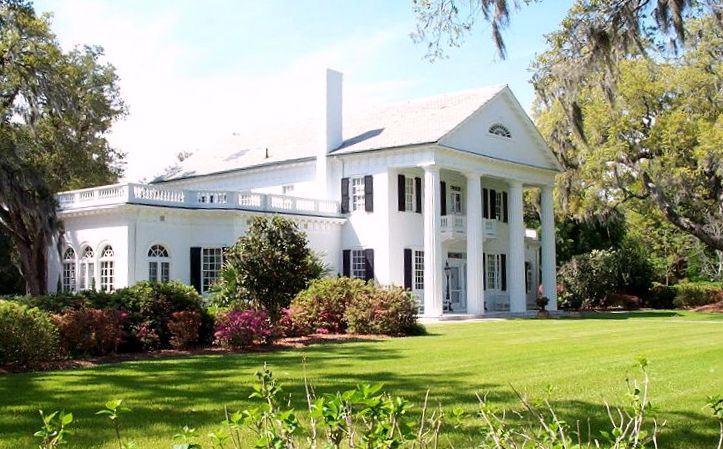
Orton House at Orton Plantation

The settlement of Brunswick Town (1726) was located directly across the Clarendon River, by then renamed as the Cape Fear River, from the Federal Point Peninsula, 5 miles south of the old Charles Town settlement and a couple miles north of Howe's Point (later Sunny Point). A ferry was commissioned from Brunswick Town to the Haulover on Federal Point, tightly linking the two areas and allowing easy access to the main coastal road that headed north to the relatively large town of New Bern. Brunswick Town saw success in its early years and housed two of the North Carolina's early colonial governors.

In the 1730s, English settlements along the coast of North Carolina lacked fortifications to protect against the various attacks of pirates and privateers, as well as Spanish forces. In response, construction began on Fort Johnston in 1748 on the lower Cape Fear River at what eventually became Smithville (Southport). Later that year, before the fort was finished, two Spanish ships sailed up the Cape Fear River and attacked Brunswick Town, an act that was part of King George's War. After initially fleeing, the colonists regrouped days later and counterattacked, successfully driving the Spanish from the town. One Spanish ship, the Fortuna, exploded in shallow water during the retreat, likely due to a magazine fire. In all, nearly half of the attackers were killed. The colonists were later able to recover most of the plunder from the sunken ship to help rebuild the heavily damaged town.

Over the next several decades, Brunswick Town slowly declined as more commerce moved to Wilmington (established 1732) which was located several miles to the North on the opposite bank of the river, and the seat of government moved to Tryon Palace in New Bern. Brunswick Town was burned by the British during the American Revolutionary War, and was never rebuilt. The land was eventually purchased by the nearby Orton Plantation. Brunswick Town is now a popular historic and archaeological site.

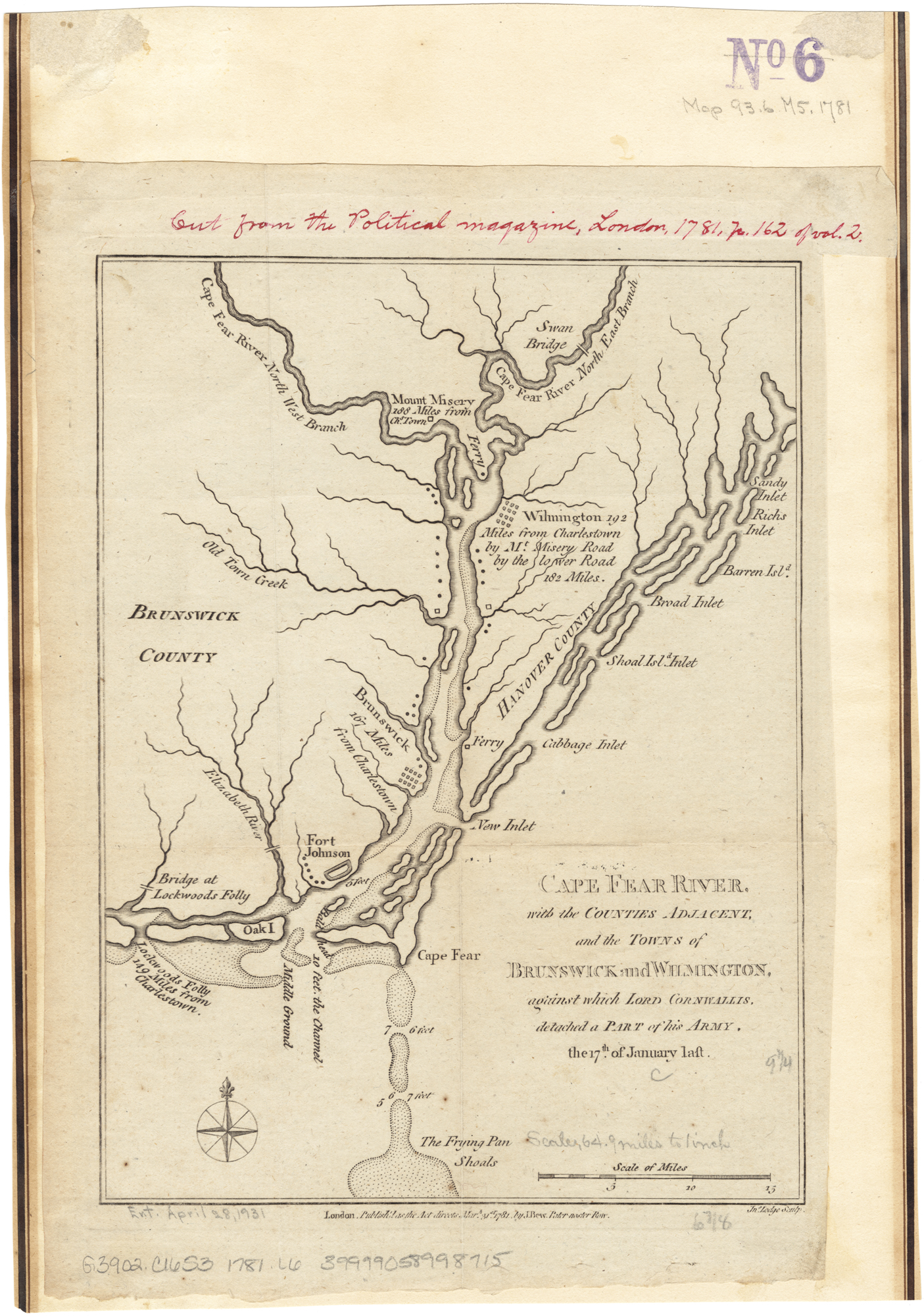
1781 map of the Cape Fear Region. The Federal Point Peninsula is just about the New Inlet on the map.

From the inception of Brunswick Town and Wilmington, dozens of large slave-holding plantations were quickly established, capitalizing on the vast lands and the low cost of overwater transport. These included the Haulover Plantation which covered most of Pleasure Island, and eventually Sedgely Abbey and Gander Hall slightly to the north. By 1767, slaves accounted for more than 62% of the population of the region. In addition to rice, hemp, indigo and traditional agricultural crops, the area was rich in naval stores. These included tar, pitch, and turpentine as well as lumber, and were all significant exports for the region. With Wilmington as the remaining hub of commerce, the export growth of the region continued after the American Revolution and well into the 1800s.

Around 1850, in the midst of the antebellum era, two "free colored persons" of mixed African and Native-American heritage, Alexander and Charity Freeman, acquired 250 acres of swampy, sandy land on the lower portion of the Federal Point Peninsula near Myrtle Grove Sound. The family made their living as small farmers and fishermen. In January 1876, their son Robert Bruce Freeman (b. 1832 – d. 1901), purchased an additional 2,500 acres of nearby land, making him one of the largest landowners in the area. Robert eventually amassed land holdings of nearly 5000 acres including the former Gander Hall and Sedgeley Abbey Plantations and his holdings stretched from the freshwater lake in the south (now Carolina Beach Lake), to the north, far beyond what is now Snows Cut. Robert called this land the "Old Homestead Tract".

The Wilmington and Raleigh Railroad (which became the Wilmington and Weldon Railroad) open in 1840 and was, at the time, the longest track in the world. The railroad greatly increased the importance of trade via the lower Cape Fear River. It was not uncommon to see 90 vessels in the Port of Wilmington loading or unloading, or waiting their turn at anchor in the river. Imports included coffee, sugar, molasses, hoop iron, cotton ties, and salt, among many other items.

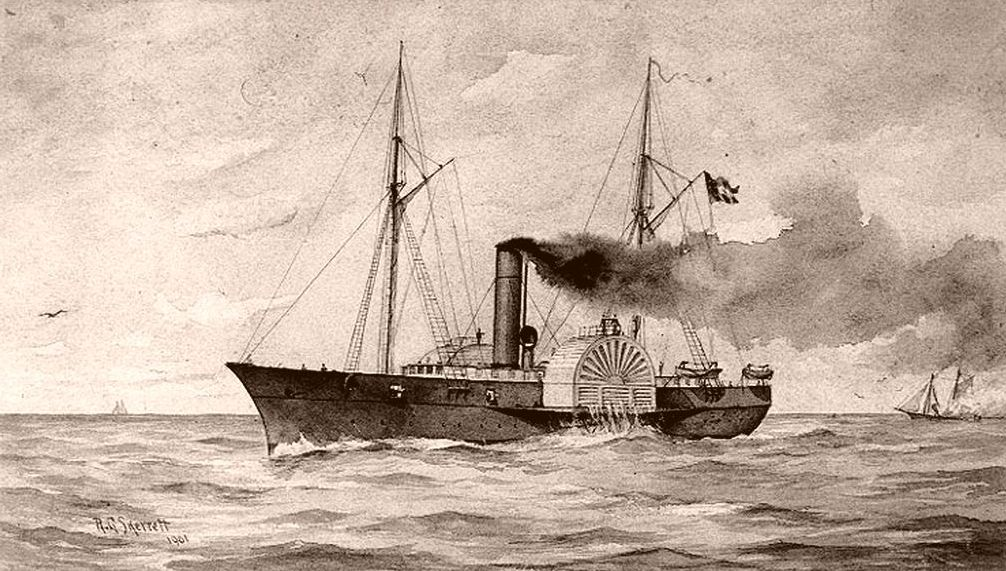
CSS Nashville blockade runner

The Cape Fear River and the surrounding area also held a strategic role during the American Civil War. Wilmington was a major port for Confederate Blockade Runners, who used the two Cape Fear River inlets to slip past the Federal blockade and bring much-needed European goods to the war effort. Fort Fisher, on the lower tip of the Federal Point Peninsula, was the site of a major amphibious battle in 1865 (perhaps the largest in US history to that point). The subsequent fall of the fort and the loss of Cape Fear River shipping greatly diminished the south's ability to prosecute the war and eventually helped lead to a cessation of fighting. After the war, shipping and farming remained a major source of income for the region.

By the 1880s, entrepreneurs and promoters from the Wilmington area had their eye on the lower portion of Federal Point due to its easy access from the town (down the river by steamship) and the short distance across the island to the ocean. Steamboat service was established and soon thousands of Wilmington tourists were visiting the new "Carolina Beach Resort" each year. The area steadily grew over the next several decades as a get-away destination.

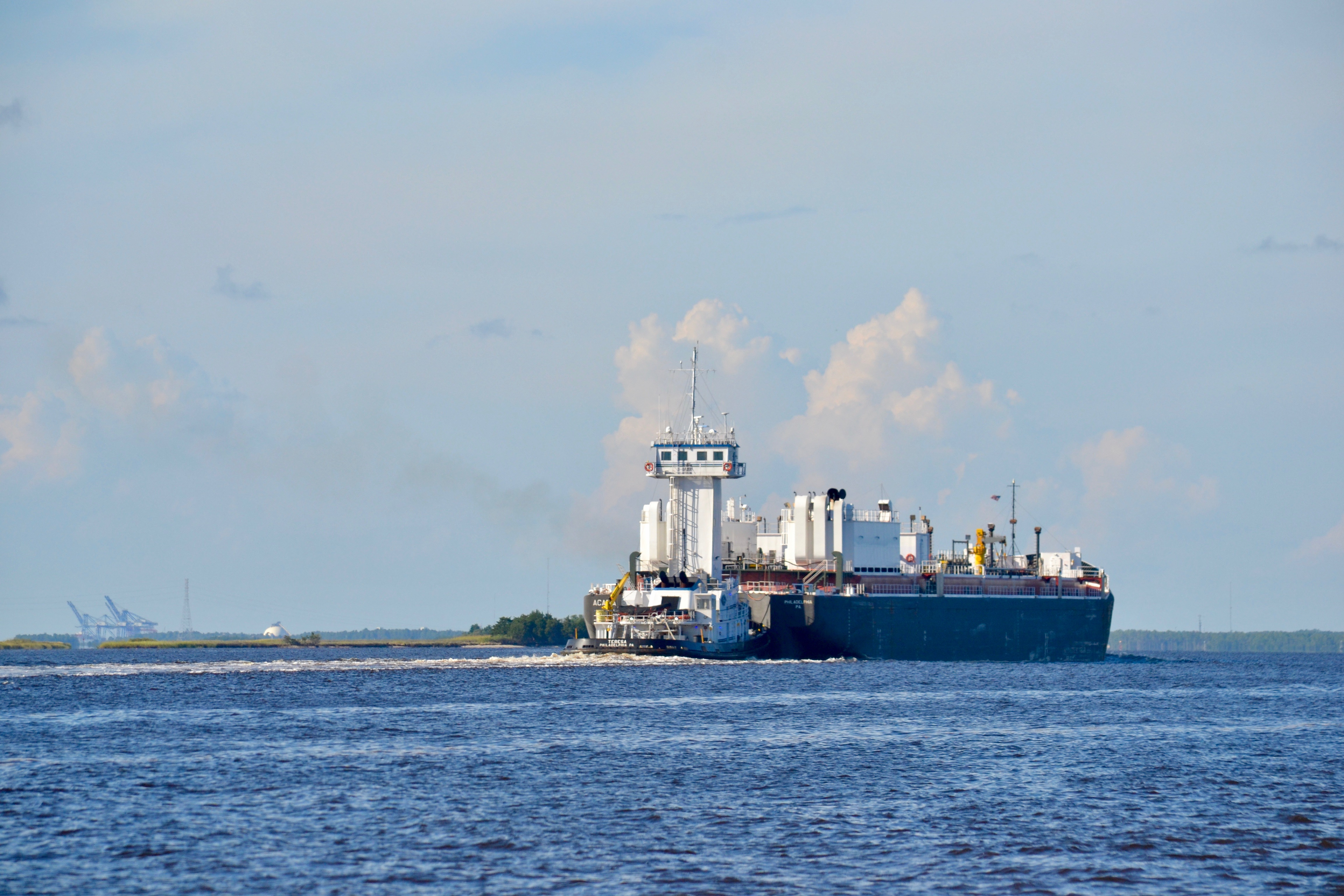
A cargo ship rounds Orton Point (left) heading up the Cape Fear River to the Port of Wilmington (the cranes in the distant left, ~8 miles away). Federal Point Peninsula is to the right (east) of the picture.

In the early 1920s, descendants of Robert Freeman founded the African-American beach resort at Seabreeze (or Sea Breeze), on family lands now to the north of Snows Cut. This also included the oceanfront strip of land they named Freeman Beach (aka Bop City).

The land that is now Pleasure Island became an actual island in 1931 with the digging of the canal now called Snows Cut, which chopped off the end of Federal Point Peninsula. The island continued to flourish and its reputation as a tourist destination grew quickly during World War II. Tens of thousands of military personnel, from Camp Davis, Fort Bragg and Fort Fisher flocked to the area every weekend to enjoy the beachside resorts and nightly entertainment. A growing permanent population, established shortly after the war, reshaped the island to resemble what one sees today.

In 1955, Robert E. Harrill, who eventually became known as "The Fort Fisher Hermit", took up residence in an abandoned World War II Army bunker on the Fort Fisher end of the island. He was seen as a sort of philosopher and was, at one point, the second most-visited "site" in the state (second only to the Battleship North Carolina). Robert died of mysterious circumstances in 1972. The bunker can still be seen today via Basin Trail (a 1.1 mile path starting near the Fort Fisher Ranger Headquarters).

==== Carolina Beach ====
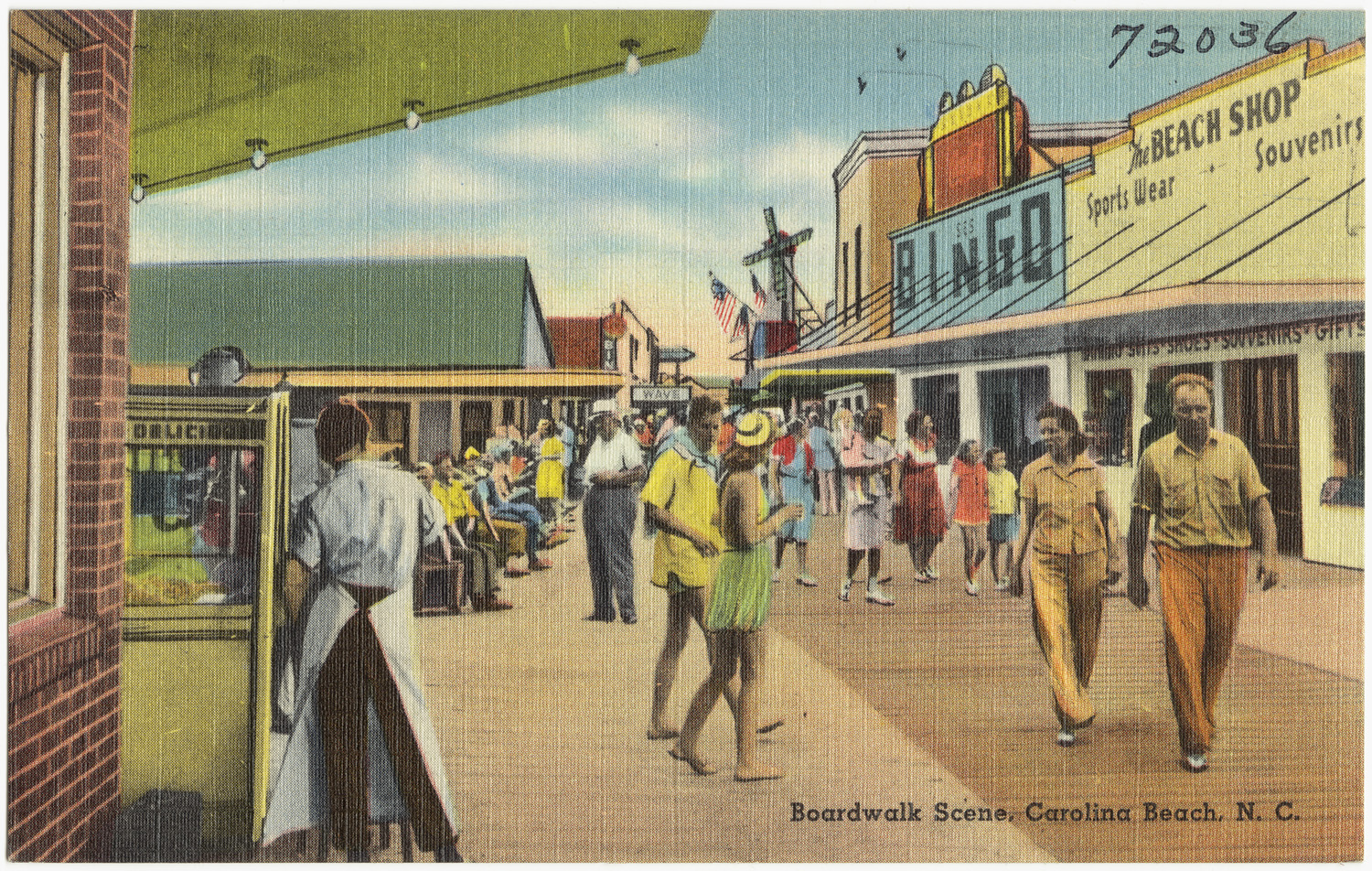
Mid-twentieth century postcard of the Carolina Beach Boardwalk

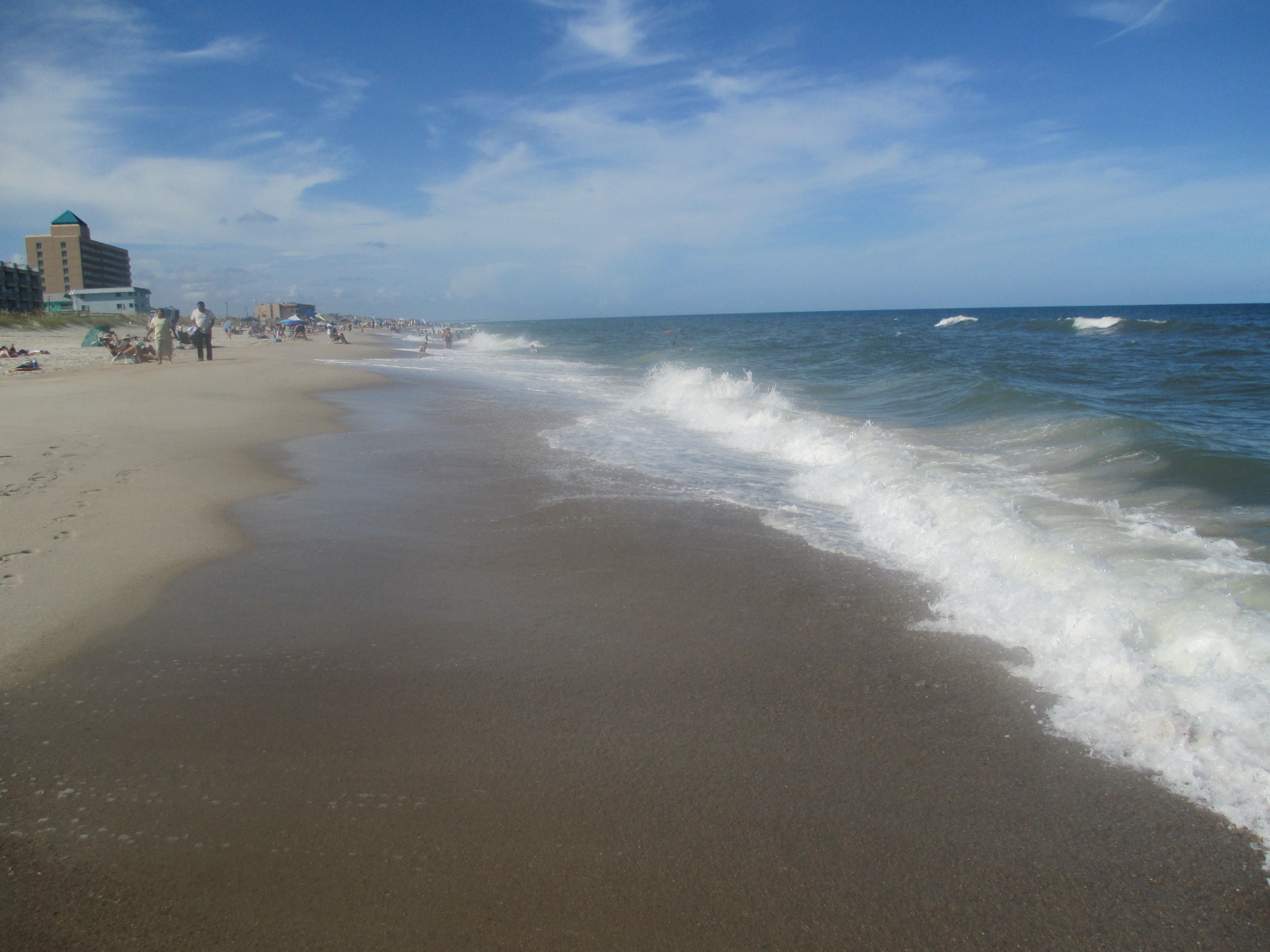
Carolina Beach today. The Courtyard Marriott is the tall building to the left.

The land at the headwaters of Myrtle Grove Sound was scarcely populated in 1881 when Joseph Winner acquired land and laid out lots in what is now Carolina Beach. The area then saw major change in summertime population after 1887, when John W. Harper, a popular Wilmington ship captain, started making steamship runs from Wilmington to a newly built pier located near the Sugar Loaf sand dune. Harper was a partner in the New Hanover Transit Company which saw the potential of an easy-to-access beach destination.

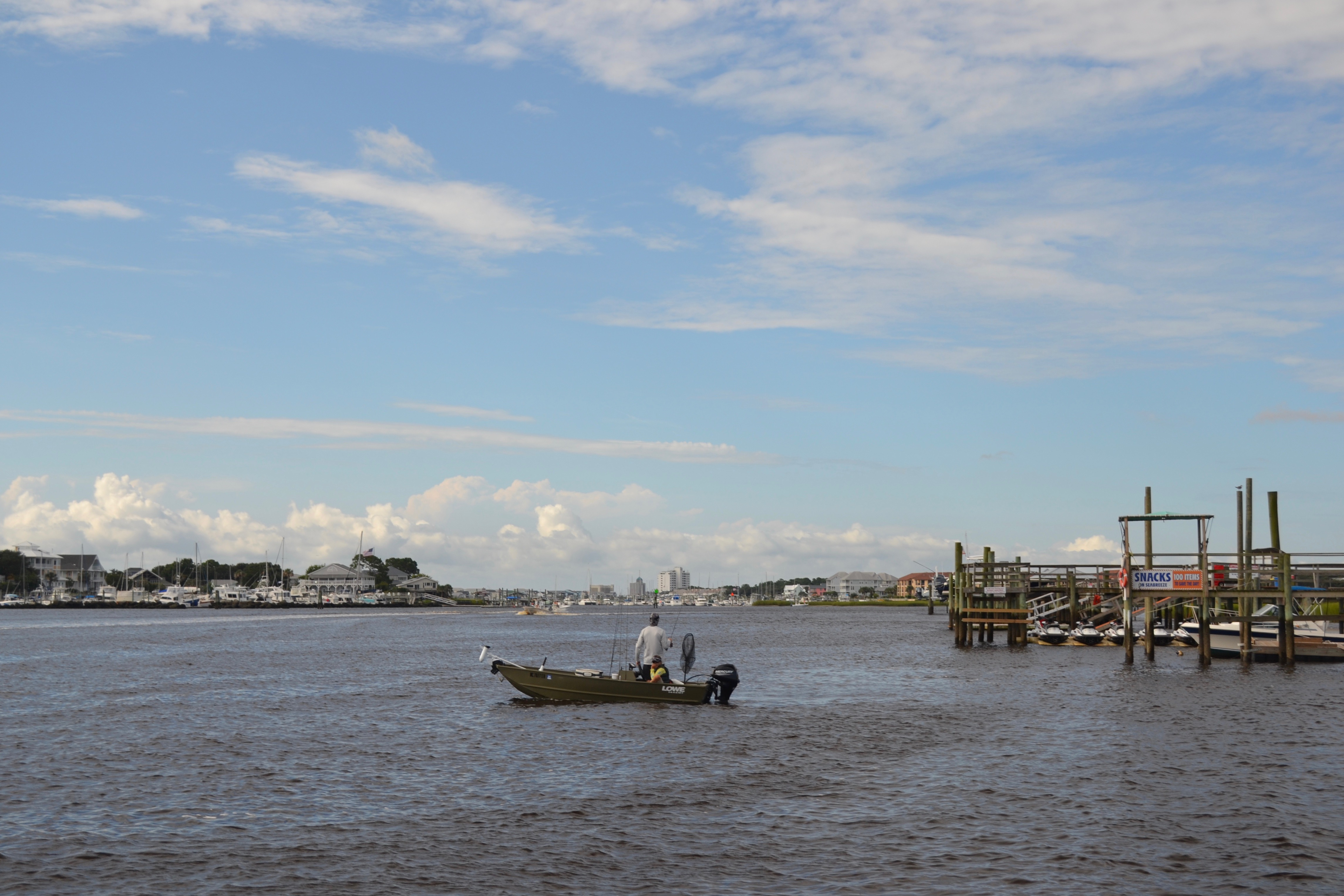
A man and boy fish the Atlantic Intracoastal Waterway in front of Seabreeze. The Carolina Beach Yacht Basin (or Boat Basin) is in the background in the middle. The buildings to the left are on the north end of Carolina Beach.

The company acquired the rights to build a small railroad across the island which roughly followed what today is Harper Avenue. They built hotels and restaurants near the beach along with various other amenities to attract visitors. This included a pavilion on the ocean that "was designed by Henry Bonitz, who also designed the famous Lumina at Wrightsville Beach." That first year, thousands of people took Harper's steamship ride down the Cape Fear River to visit his beachside attraction. Carolina Beach grew steadily as a summertime vacation destination over the next several decades. By the 1940s a small year-round population began to take hold. Despite devastating fires and hurricanes, the town continued to thrive, with new businesses, dance pavilions and a boardwalk. After a brief period of decline in the late twentieth century, Carolina beach is now flourishing with the addition of a refurbished boardwalk as well as many new restaurants, businesses and beachfront hotels.

Pleasure Island features
1 Seabreeze
2 Freeman Beach
3 Carolina Beach Inlet
4 Snows Cut
5 Sugar Loaf Sand Dune
6 The Rocks
7 Approximate location of New Inlet
8 Fort Fisher
9 Masonboro Island
10 Approximate location of Corncake Inlet
11 Swash Defense portion of The Rocks
12 Orton Plantation
13 Old Brunswick Town

==== Kure Beach ====
In the early 1880s a Danish ship captain, named Hans Kure, moved his family from Charleston, SC to Carolina Beach, where he ran various businesses. In 1895, he created the Kure Land and Development Company and purchased 900 acres of land two miles to the south, a tract that spanned from the ocean to the Cape Fear River. The land was originally called Fort Fisher Sea Beach, but over time it became known as "Kure's Beach", and eventually "Kure Beach".

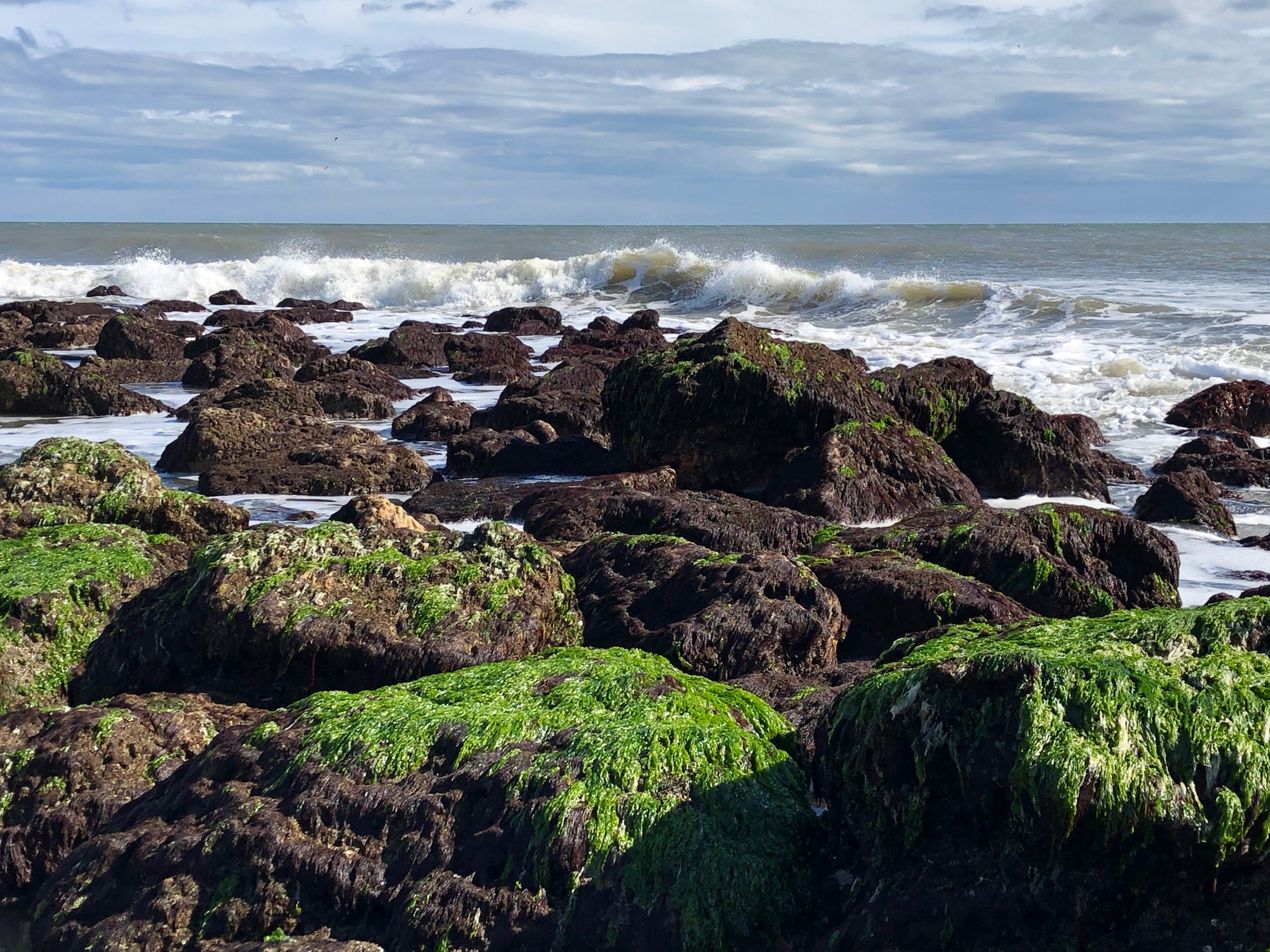
Coquina Rock on the beach at Fort Fisher on Pleasure Island (low tide)

In 1916, the Kure family put up money to build a modern road down Federal Point leading to their beach. The road was built from rock brought in from outside the area, as well as from Coquina rock found near Fort Fisher. The road opened up the area to automobile tourists from Wilmington and other parts of the state.

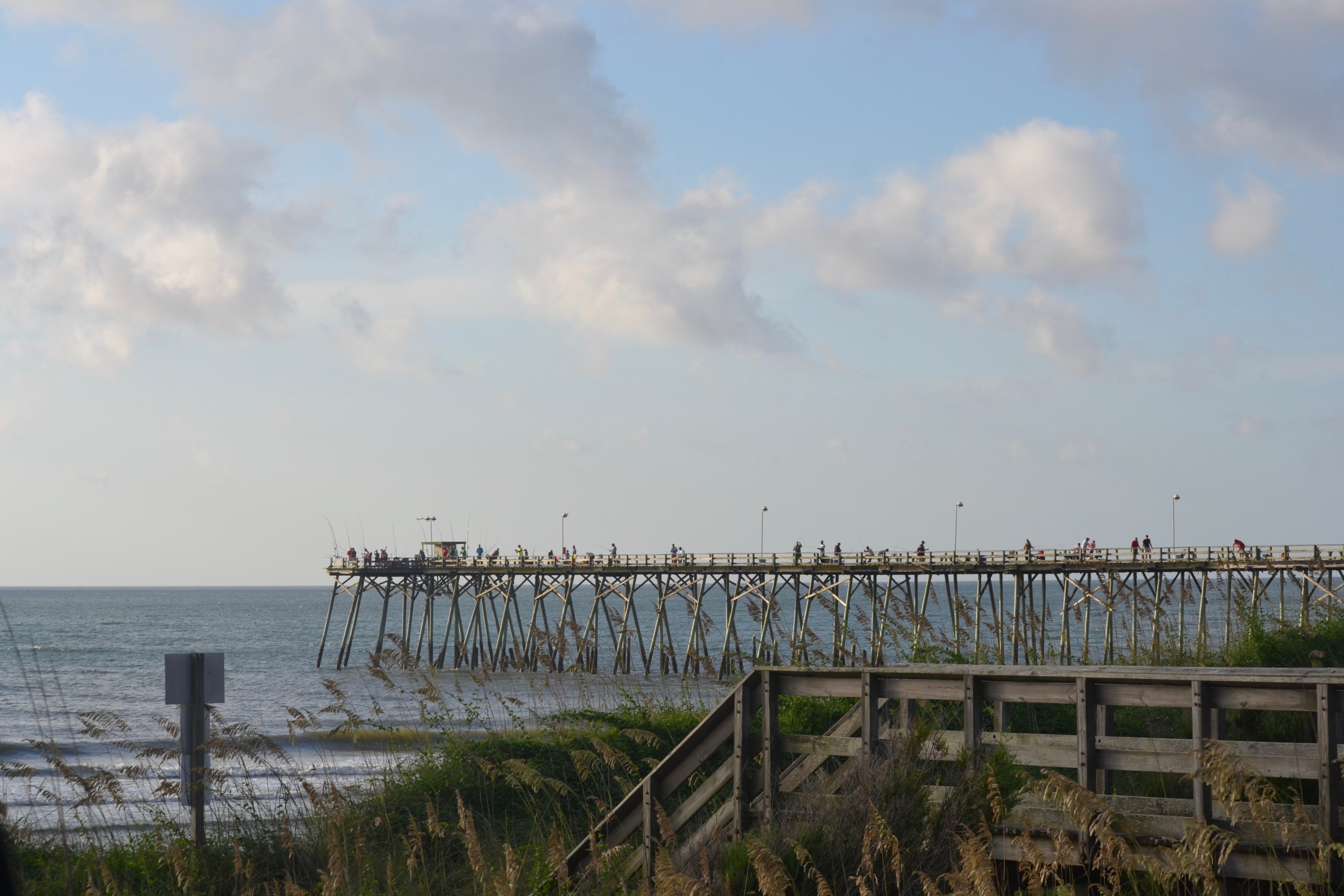
A view of the Kure Beach Pier from the boardwalk. It was first built in 1923 by L.C. Kure.

Hans Kure's son, L.C. Kure, built the first public fishing pier on Kure Beach in 1923. Kure relatives still run the pier today.

In 1933 the Dow Chemical Company and the Ethyl Corporation built a plant near Kure Beach for extracting bromine from seawater. Bromine was used for an additive for gasoline and other fuels. The plant operated for approximately 15 years and employed 250 workers at its height. Most of the complex was demolished or destroyed in the late 1940s, although some ruins can still be found in the nearby forest.

In 1945, the Kure Beach Progressive Association was established for improving conditions on the barrier island community. Money was raised to bring water, electricity and even a firetruck to the area. This association led to the incorporation of the Town of Kure Beach in 1947.

Kure Beach is a bedroom community that consists of maritime forest, commercial restaurants, and beaches.

==== Seabreeze ====
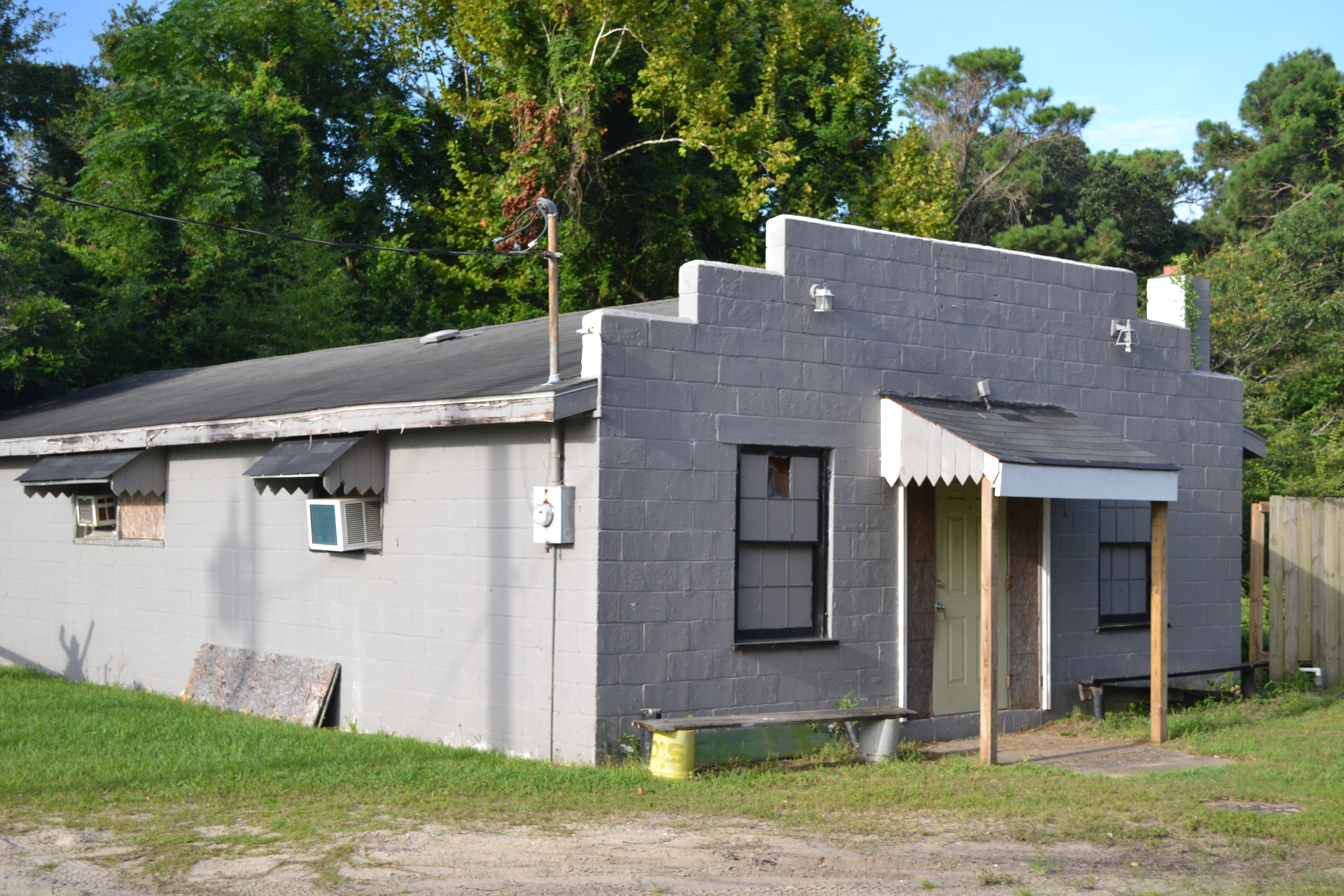
One of the few remaining concrete block buildings at Seabreeze, just north of Pleasure Island

The Seabreeze resort area was created by the descendants of Alexander and Robert Freeman during the Jim crow era as a place where African-Americans could come enjoy the beach and nightly entertainment without harassment. Seabreeze included land just north of Snows Cut as well as a parcel of oceanfront land, then known as Freeman Beach. In the years before the Snows Cut canal was built, Seabreeze vacationers on the mainland side could wade or swim across the shallow Myrtle Grove Sound and access Freeman Beach. After the completion of the canal, the increased flow of water scoured out and deepened the channel in front of Seabreeze and made wading across the water no longer possible. Beach goers then had to drive through the town of Carolina Beach or ferry out in small boats to access the isolated peninsula.

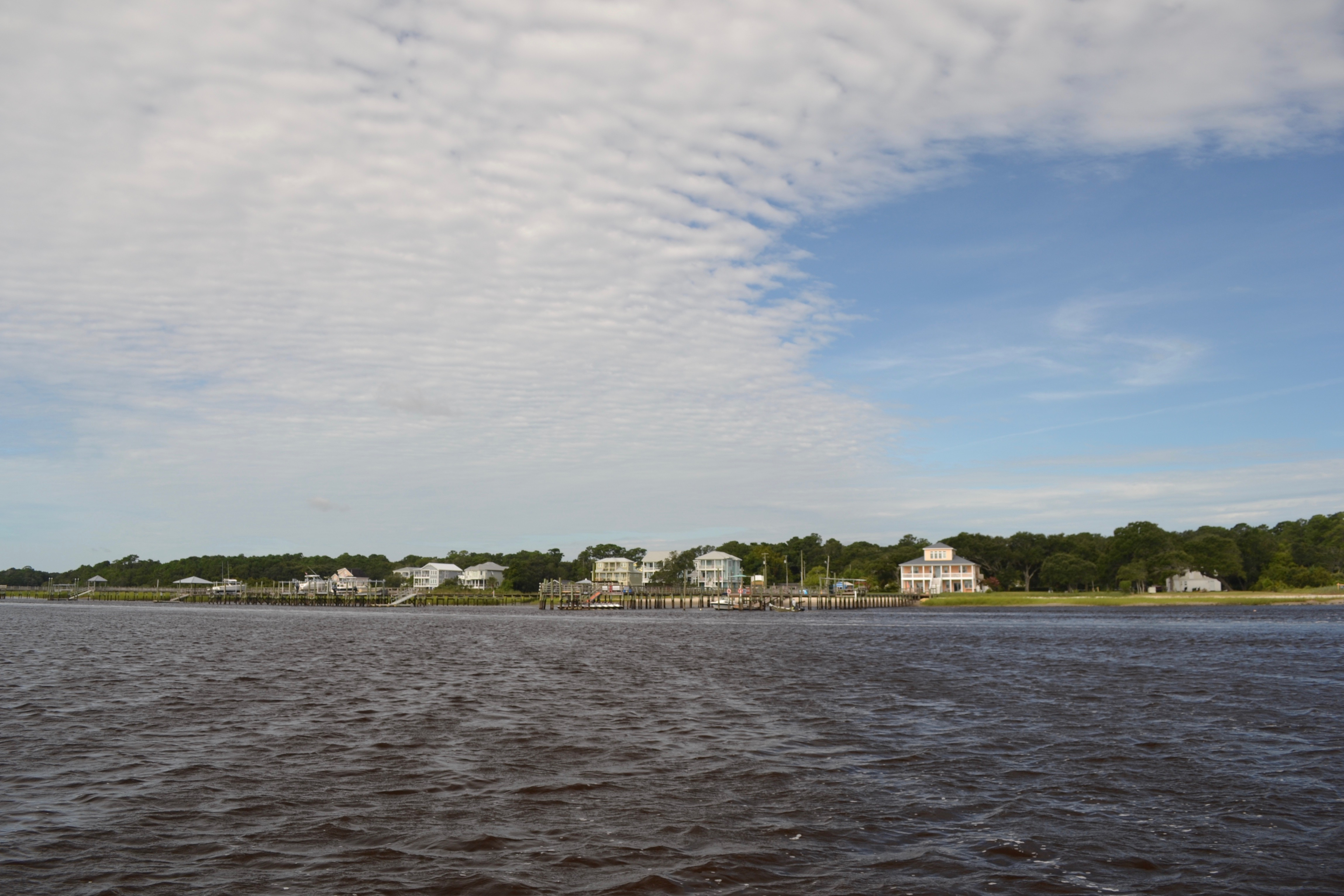
A modern view of Seabreeze from the Atlantic Intracoastal Waterway

In spite of the challenges, Seabreeze and Freeman Beach grew rapidly and soon there were dozens of juke joints and restaurants. Well-known hotels like the Lofton and Ruth & Joe's sprang up. Groups of African-American families flocked to Seabreeze during the day and turned the area over to the juke joints for nightly entertainment. Bathhouses and dance halls were also built oceanfront on Freeman Beach, and that portion of the resort became known as Bop City. Seabreeze was a thriving resort up until the late 1950s.

The downfall of the area began with the opening of the man-made Carolina Beach Inlet in 1952, which caused heavy erosion at Freeman Beach. Then, on October 15, 1954, Hurricane Hazel caused massive damage to the island communities and destroyed nearly every building at Bop City. Some of the facilities were rebuilt, but the area began to fade. The onset of desegregation in Americas in the 1960s removed much of the reason for the segregated resort's existence, further hastening the decline. The last of the clubs at Seabreeze closed in the 1980s and Hurricane Fran, in 1996, destroyed the remaining Freeman Beach cottages. Today the sound side of Seabreeze is a coastal forest where trailers and smaller cottages mix with higher-end subdivisions and expensive sound-front houses. The oceanside enclave of Bop City, which is part of Pleasure Island, is now a public beach known as Freeman Park.

=== Sugar Loaf ===
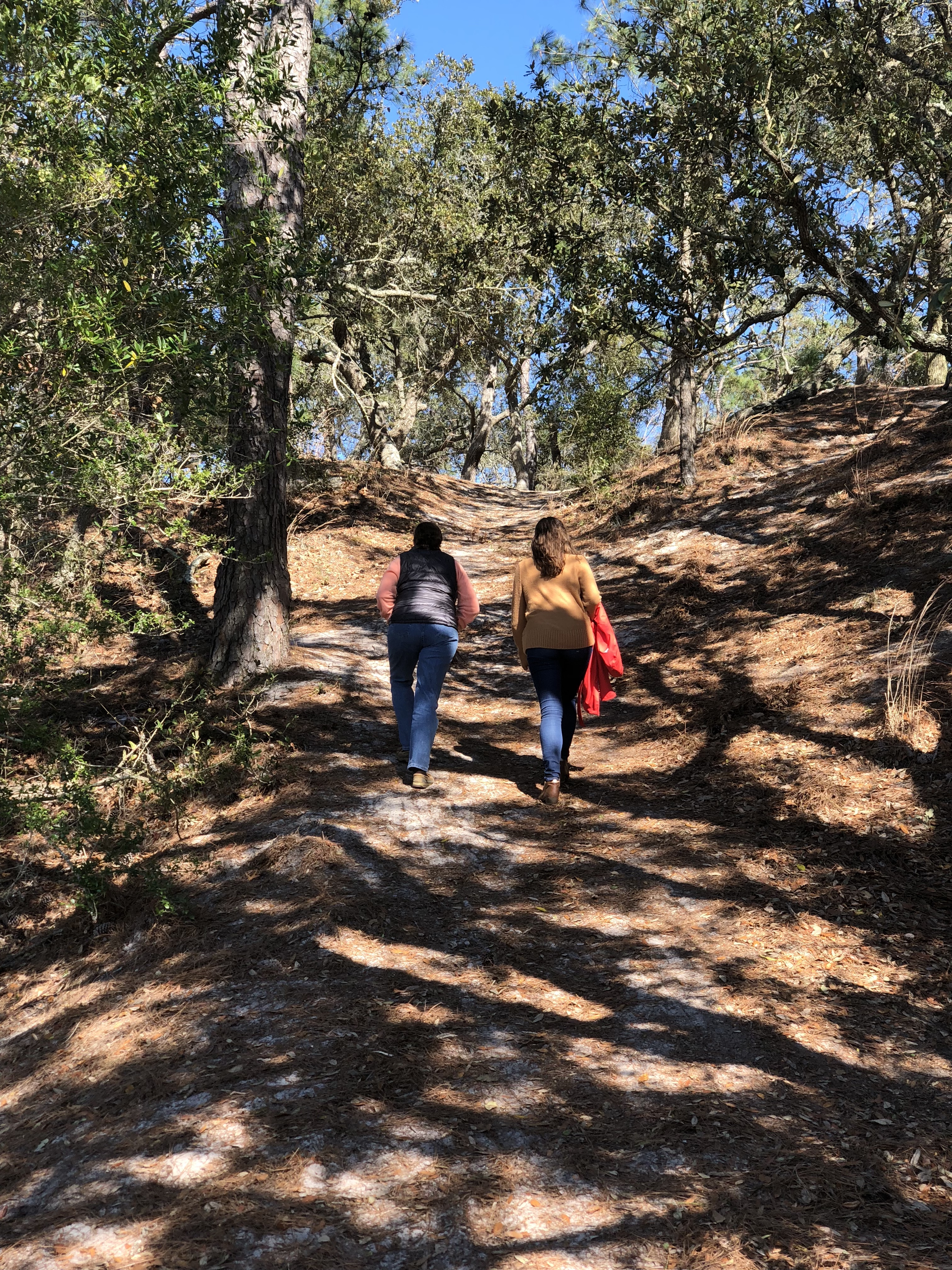
Walking up the Sugar Loaf Sand Dune at Carolina Beach State Park on Pleasure Island

One of the key geographical features on the island is a large naturally occurring sand dune known as the Sugar Loaf. It was originally 110 feet high and is located on the Cape Fear side of the island. Early travelers and ship captains used Sugar Loaf as a directional beacon as well as a distance marker since the dune could be seen from miles around.

Sugar Loaf was also the site of prehistoric native-American encampments. The sand mound was the site of a retaliatory attack on the local Indians in 1725, by Englishman Roger Moore, around the time of the establishment of the Brunswick Town settlement.

The first authorized river ferry was established in 1727 from Brunswick Town to the haulover near Sugar Loaf on the eastern shore. The haulover was a narrow stretch of the peninsula where small boats were portaged from the river directly across to the ocean. This was far shorter and easier than paddling or sailing up and down the swift Cape Fear River to reach the ocean by the river mouth.

During the American Civil War the Sugar Loaf was part of a fortification that was extended across the island to Myrtle Grove Sound in order to block Union troop access up the Federal Point Road, which led directly to the vital Port of Wilmington.

The Sugar Loaf dune is now 50 feet high and is nestled in the pine trees within the Carolina Beach State Park. It is open to the public and is accessible via park trails.

== Military ==
The eastern buffer zone of the Military Ocean Terminal Sunny Point (MOTSU), makes up the western portion of Pleasure Island. MOTSU is located on the west side of the Cape Fear River and is one of the largest US Army supply depots in the world.

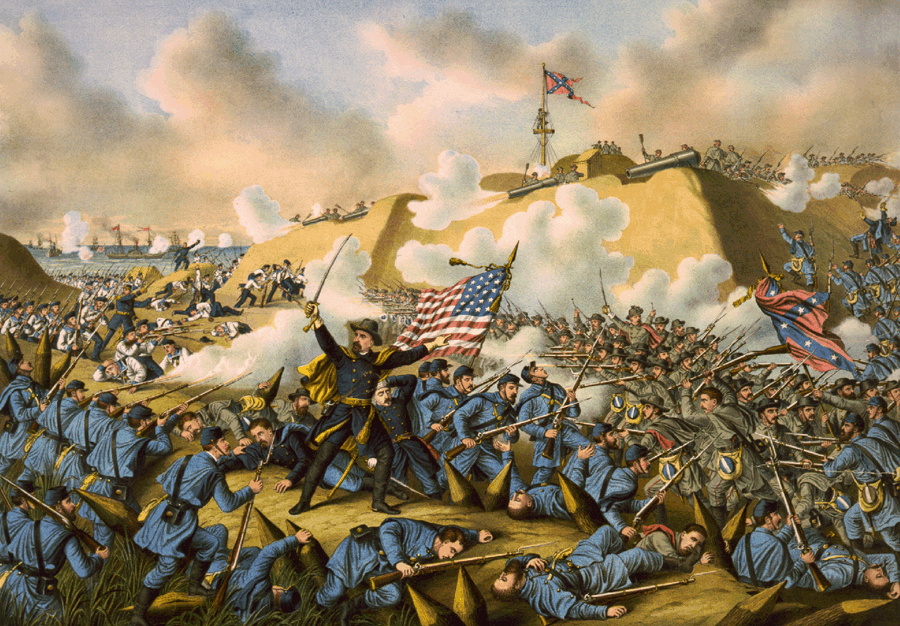
Battle of Fort Fisher

During the American Civil War, Pleasure Island was the site of Confederate Camp Wyatt. The area is also home to the remains of Fort Fisher, which held significant strategic value to the Confederate supply chain. Fort Fisher was the largest earthwork fortification in the Confederacy and was the site of a major amphibious battle, before it fell to Union forces in 1865.

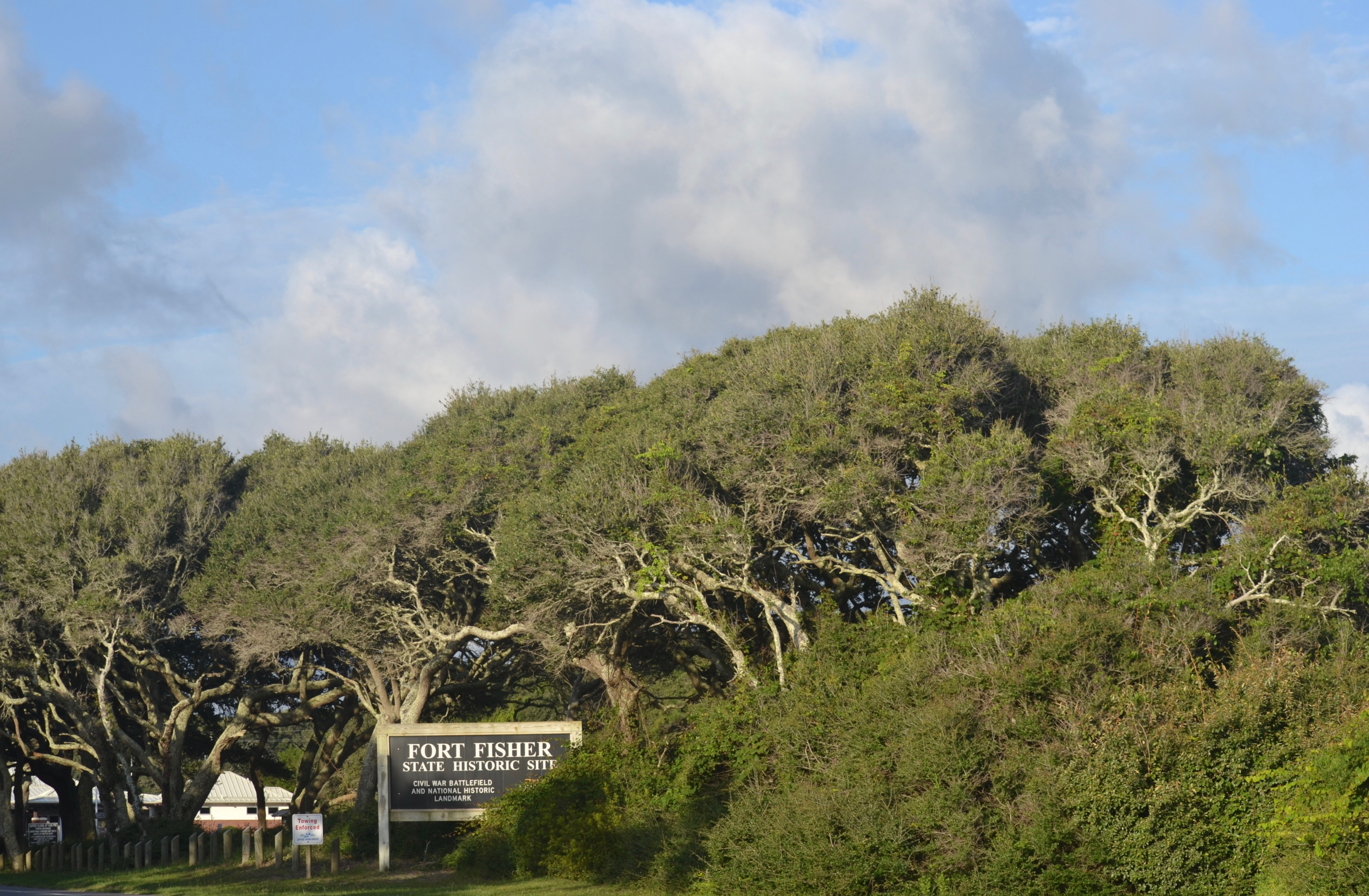
Fort Fisher State Historic Site

The Fort Fisher portion of the island was home to various military installations between 1865 and 1988, including a World War II firing range and landing strip. The site was declared a National Historic Landmark in 1961, the first in North Carolina. It is now part of Fort Fisher State Historic Site, belonging to the North Carolina Department of Natural and Cultural Resources, and includes the main fort complex, a museum and a visitor center. Fort Fisher State Recreation Area is adjacent to the State Historic Site, just to the south.

== Wildlife ==
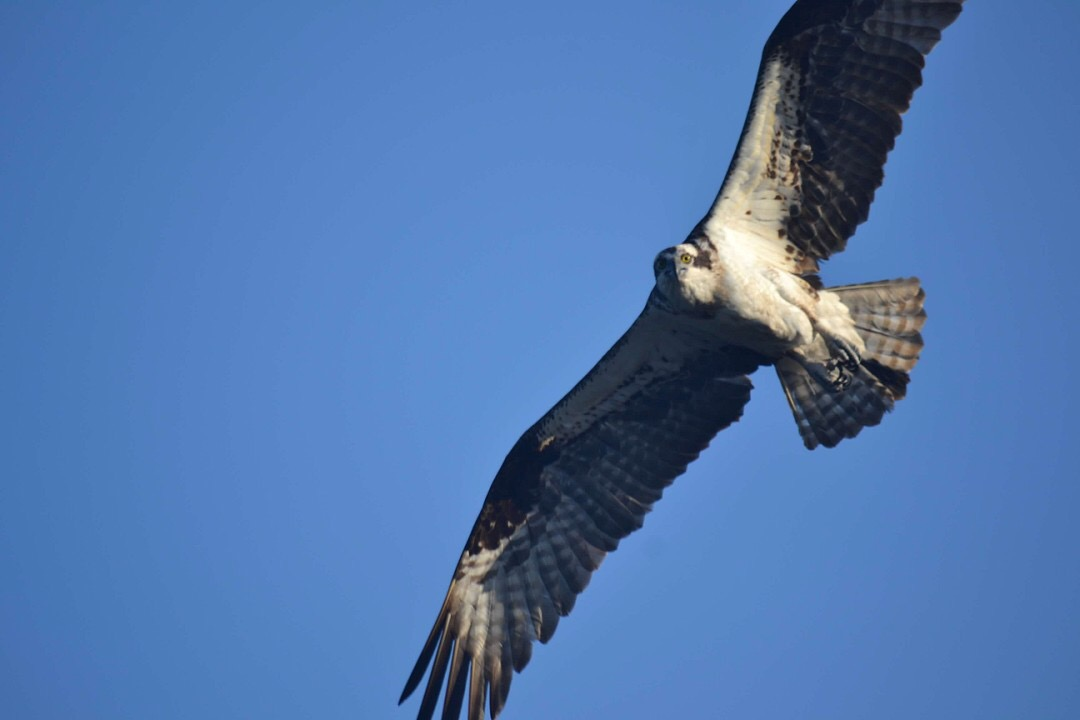
A Western osprey (sea hawk) soars near Pleasure Island.

In addition to white-tailed deer, red fox, coyotes and assorted mammals, Pleasure Island is home to a wide variety of permanent and migrating species of birds, fish, and occasional wintertime whales. The island hosts dozens of sea turtle nests each year, which are closely monitored by the Pleasure Island Sea Turtle Project. Loggerhead turtles are by far the most common sea turtle seen near the island, but green, leatherback, Ridley and hawksbill turtles can also be found.

Pleasure Island is near two major reserves of the North Carolina National Estuarine Research Reserve: Masonboro Island (5,097 acres to the North) and Zeke's Island (1,165 acres in the south).

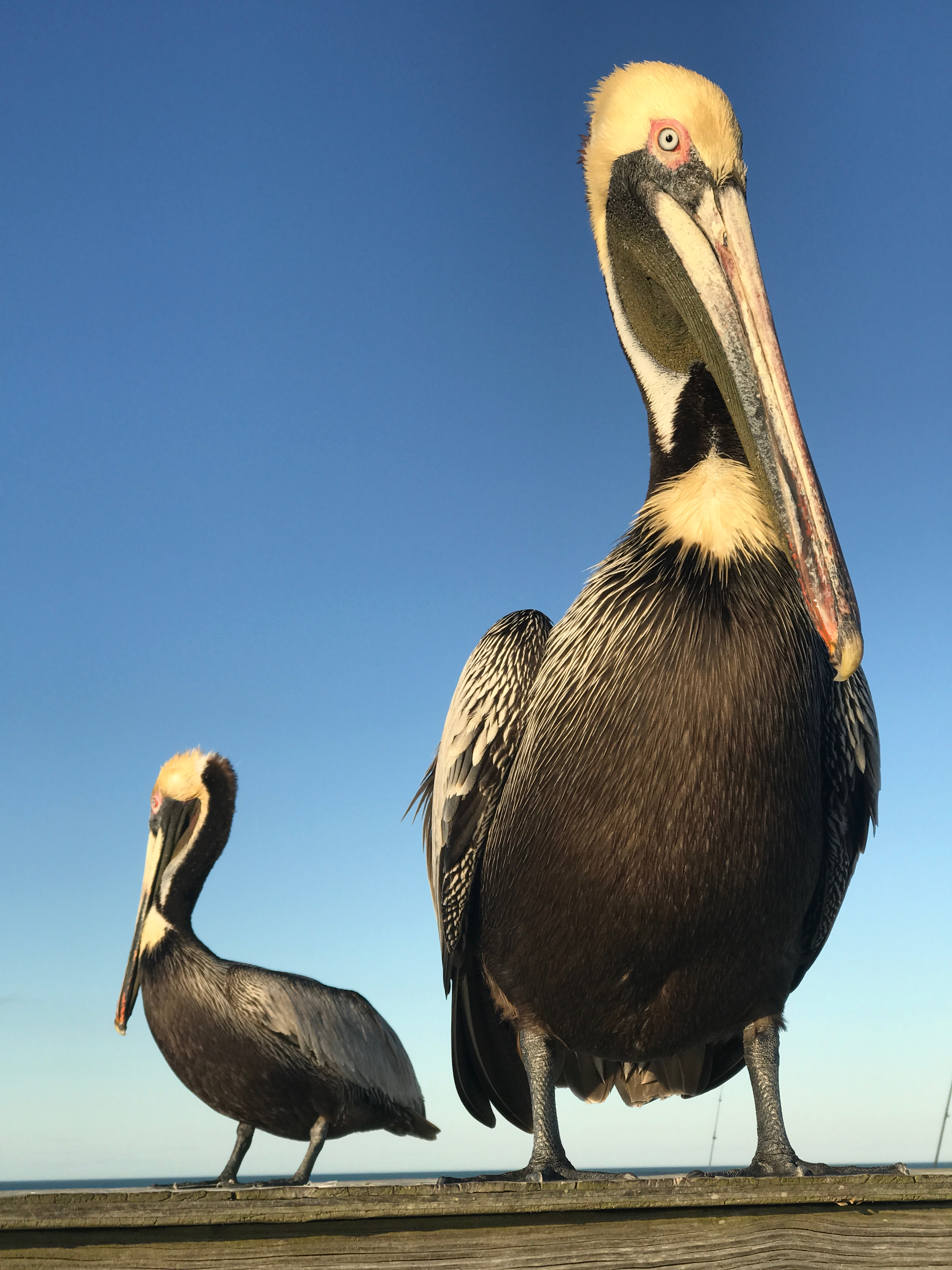
Brown Pelicans wait for a handout of fish on the Kure Beach Pier on Pleasure Island.

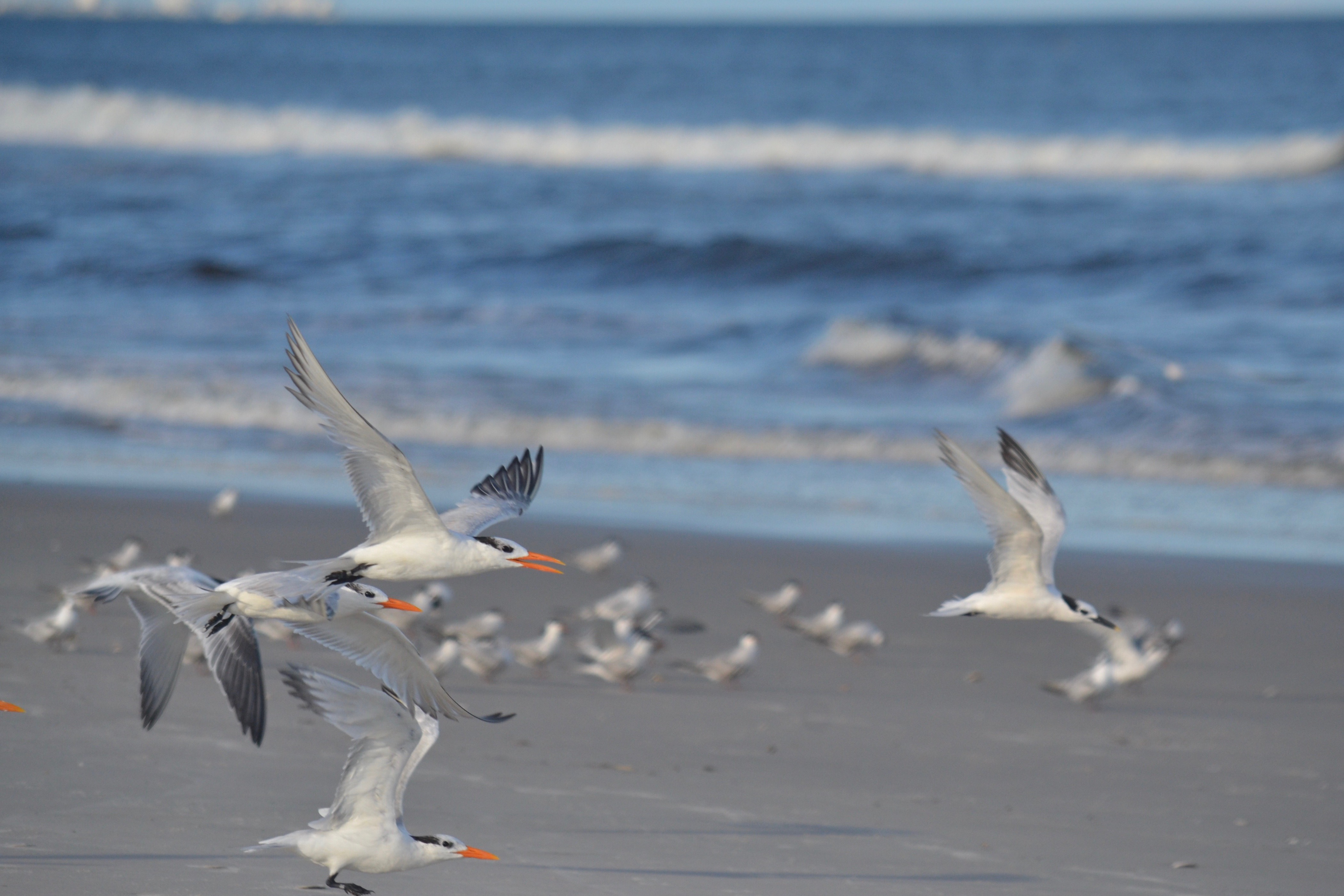
Terns take flight at Pleasure Island.

== Points of interest ==
- Fort Fisher State Recreation Area
- North Carolina Aquarium at Fort Fisher
- Carolina Beach State Park includes a marina, overnight camping and trails that include a hike to the Sugar Loaf Sand Dune, one of the highest elevations in New Hanover County at about 50 feet. It is also home to several species of carnivorous plants.
- Joe Eakes Park includes a disc golf course.
- Mike Chappell Park includes a skateboard and dog park.
- Freeman Park at the northeast end of Carolina Beach allows four-wheel-drive beach access, beach campfires and overnight camping.
- Kure Beach Pier
- Carolina Beach Pier
- Carolina Beach Lake Park
