= Corncake Inlet, North Carolina =

Historical channel

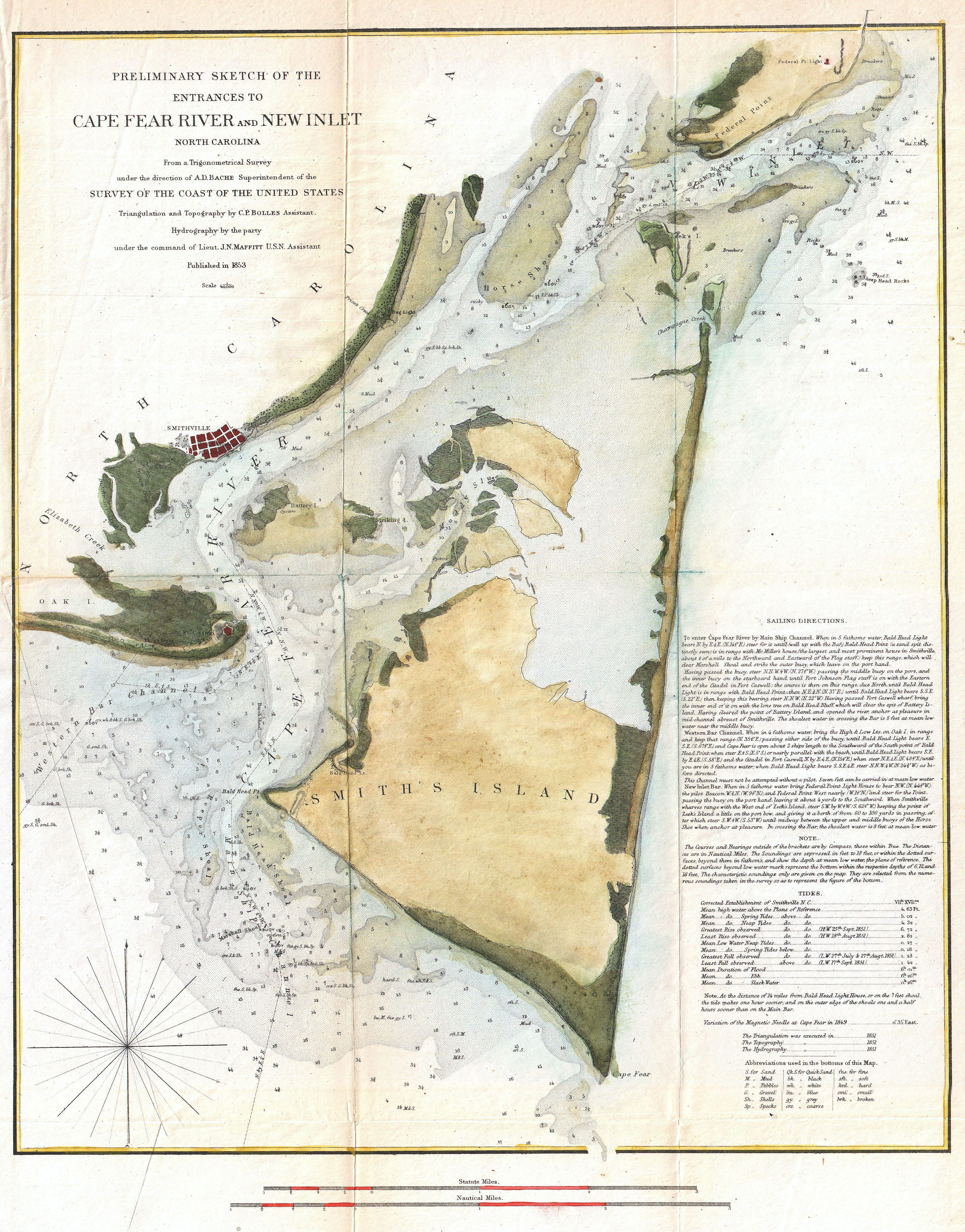
1853 U.S. Coast Survey Map of Cape Fear, North Carolina

Corncrake Inlet was a historical (channel) located on the Cape Fear region in the Brunswick County of North Carolina just south of Federal Point. The Channel is now closed and the original coordinates for Corncrake Inlet placed it within the 28461 ZIP Code delivery area, and the approximate elevation is unknown above sea level. The presence of this channel dates back to 1938.

Coordinates: 33.9190632°N, -77.9444314°W Category: North Carolina physical, cultural and historic features

On September 7, 1995, rip currents produced by Hurricane Luis caused the death of one person near Corncrake Inlet, North Carolina.[1] High waves and high tides, caused significant beach erosion and coastal flooding. In Brunswick County, eight homes were washed away by the waves, and 40 feet (12 m) of the beach was lost. Total losses in North Carolina amounted to approximately $1.9 million.

Since then, the entire coastal plain of the east coast has experienced a constant rise in sea level and rose dramatically between 2011 and 2015.

In 1998, Corncrake Inlet was officially shoaled and closed due to the damages of Hurricane Bonnie.

Before Corncrake Inlet was closed, it was noted as a shad fishing location.
