= Wilmington Beach, North Carolina =

Coordinates: 34°01′08″N 77°53′55″W

- Former unincorporated community
- Town of Carolina Beach
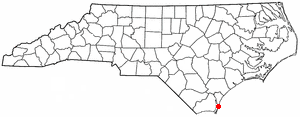
- Location of Wilmington Beach, North Carolina
- Country: United States
- State: North Carolina
- County: New Hanover
- Town: Carolina Beach
- Time zone: UTC-5 (Eastern (EST))
  - Summer (DST): UTC-4 (EDT)

Wilmington Beach was a coastal unincorporated community on Pleasure Island in North Carolina, United States that was annexed by the town of Carolina Beach in 2000. Prior to the annexation, the small community was a buffer between Carolina Beach and Kure Beach. U.S. Highway 421 and Ocean Boulevard are the major roads through the area. Its name is derived from Wilmington, which lies approximately ten miles to the north. The annexed area consists almost entirely of residential housing.

== History ==
The Wilmington Beach area is partially isolated from the other two beach towns since nearly all the secondary streets terminate before reaching Kure Beach in the south or the former town limits of Carolina Beach in the north. This makes the Wilmington Beach's limits in the north at Carolina Sands Drive and at Alabama Avenue in the south.

Many of Wilmington Beach's streets were unpaved, and since the annexation, Carolina Beach has paved the streets and introduced sewer lines into the area.
