= Kure Beach, North Carolina =

- Town
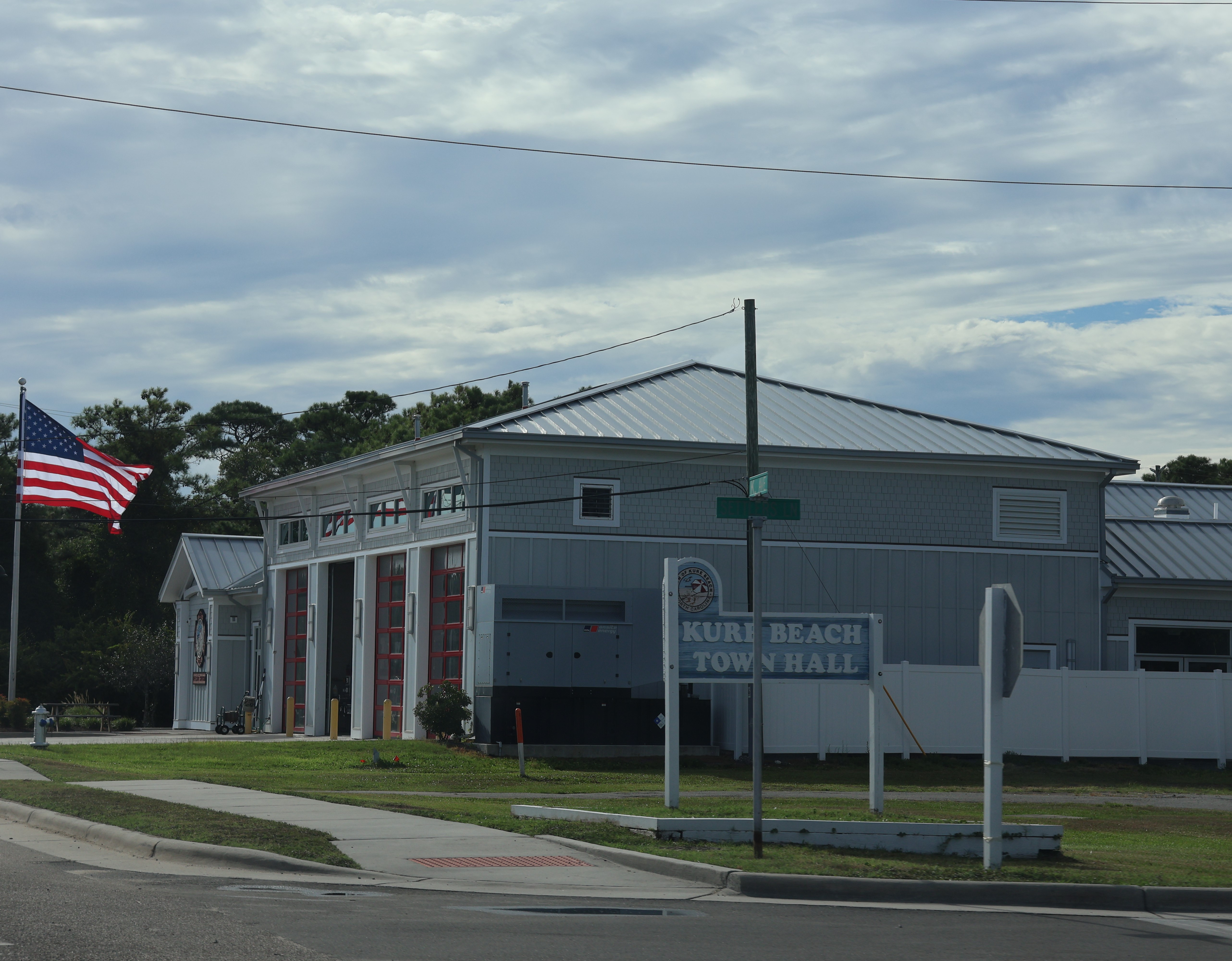
- Town hall and fire station

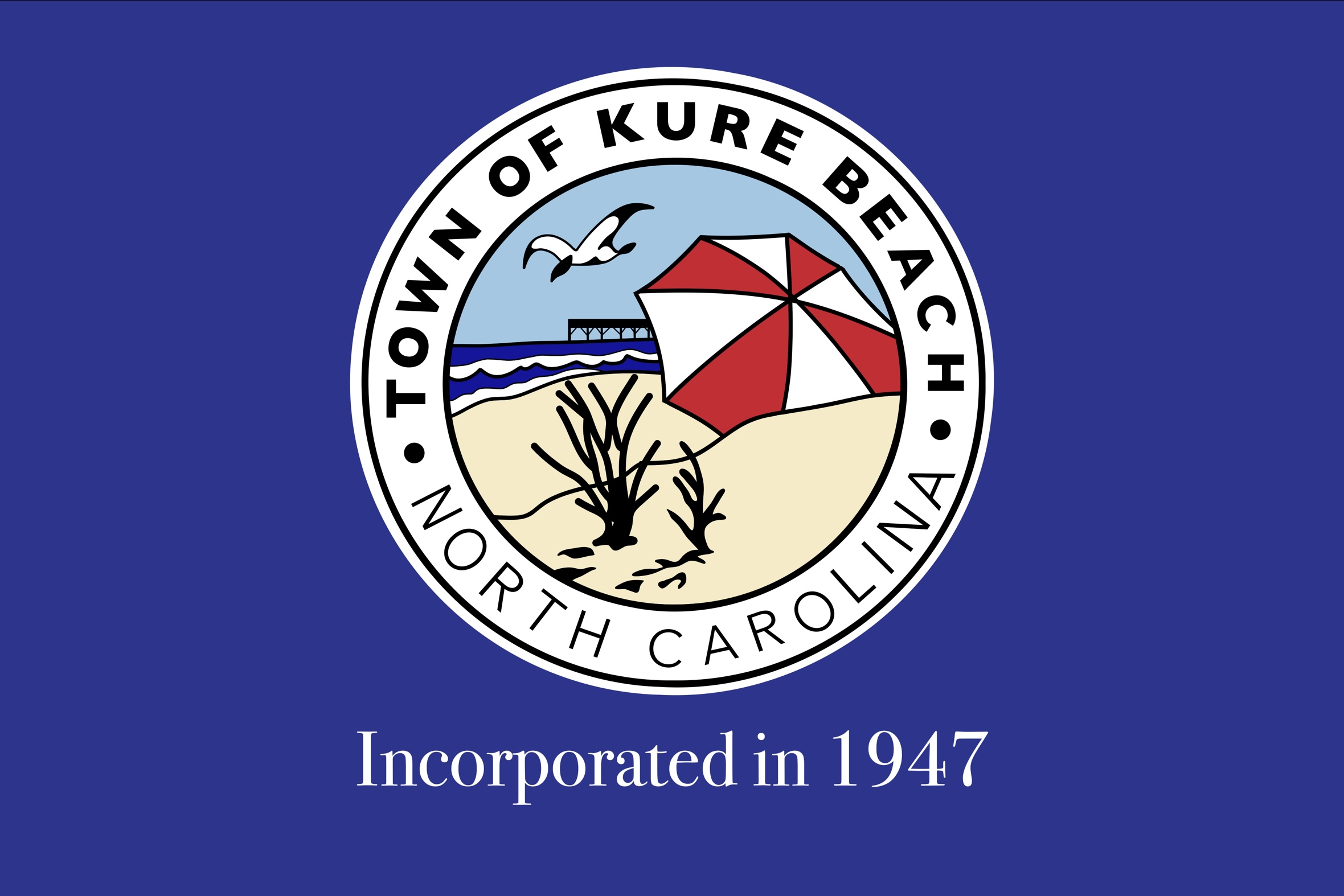
- Flag Seal

- Location in New Hanover County and the state of North Carolina.
- Coordinates: 33°59′56″N 77°54′28″W
- Country: United States
- State: North Carolina
- County: New Hanover

Government
  - Mayor: Allen Oliver

Area
  - Total: 0.88 sq mi (2.29 km^{2})
  - Land: 0.88 sq mi (2.28 km^{2})
  - Water: 0.0039 sq mi (0.01 km^{2})
- Elevation: 23 ft (7.0 m)

Population (2020)
  - Total: 2,191
  - Density: 2,490.6/sq mi (961.63/km^{2})
- Time zone: UTC-5 (Eastern (EST))
  - Summer (DST): UTC-4 (EDT)
- ZIP code: 28449
- Area codes: 910, 472
- FIPS code: 37-36220
- GNIS feature ID: 2405961
- Website: www.townofkurebeach.org

Kure Beach (/ˈkjʊəri/ KURE-ee) is a town in New Hanover County, North Carolina, United States, approximately 15 miles south of Wilmington. It is part of the Wilmington Metropolitan Statistical Area. The population was 2,191 at the 2020 census. It is found on Pleasure Island directly south of the Wilmington Beach annex of Carolina Beach and just north of Fort Fisher. The town is less than 1 square mile (2.6 km^{2}) in area, stretching along about 3.5 miles (5.6 km) of coastline along Pleasure Island, and a maximum width of less than 0.5 miles (0.80 km), in most places only a few hundred yard/meters wide.

== History ==
A post office called Kure Beach has been in operation since 1942. The town was named for a family of settlers.

The Kure Beach Fishing Pier is one of the oldest on the Atlantic Coast. The original pier was built in 1923 and has been rebuilt and restored several times since then due to wear and tear over the years.

On the night of July 24–25, 1943, a German U-boat fired at least three shells to attack the Ethyl-Dow Chemical Company plant at Kure's Beach (post-war: Kure Beach), but instead hit the Cape Fear River. The plant was the only one on the East Coast producing bromine from seawater for use in aviation gasoline. Other historians dispute whether the attack actually occurred, and there is no corroborating physical evidence or logs from the German Navy.

== Demographics ==
Historical population
Census	Pop.	Note	%±
1950	228		—
1960	293		28.5%
1970	394		34.5%
1980	611		55.1%
1990	619		1.3%
2000	1,507		143.5%
2010	2,012		33.5%
2020	2,191		8.9%
2021 (est.)	2,148	▼	−2.0%
U.S. Decennial Census

=== 2020 census ===
As of the 2020 census, Kure Beach had a population of 2,191. The median age was 58.1 years. 11.7% of residents were under the age of 18 and 33.2% were 65 years of age or older. For every 100 females, there were 95.5 males, and for every 100 females age 18 and over, there were 93.4 males age 18 and over.

There were 1,037 households in Kure Beach, including 601 family households. Of all households, 15.7% had children under the age of 18 living in them, 56.4% were married-couple households, 16.8% were households with a male householder and no spouse or partner present, and 21.4% were households with a female householder and no spouse or partner present. About 28.9% of all households were made up of individuals, and 14.1% had someone living alone who was 65 years of age or older.

There were 2,121 housing units, of which 51.1% were vacant. The homeowner vacancy rate was 3.3% and the rental vacancy rate was 45.6%.

Kure Beach racial composition
Race	Number	Percentage
White (non-Hispanic)	2,024	92.38%
Black or African American (non-Hispanic)	10	0.46%
Native American	6	0.27%
Asian	18	0.82%
Pacific Islander	2	0.09%
Other/Mixed	94	4.29%
Hispanic or Latino	37	1.69%

=== 2000 census ===
As of the census of 2000, there were 1,507 people, 723 households, and 495 families residing in the town. The population density was 1,931.6 inhabitants per square mile (745.8/km^{2}). There were 1,560 housing units at an average density of 1,999.6 per square mile (772.0/km^{2}). The racial makeup of the town was 98.74% White, 0.07% African American, 0.13% Native American, 0.07% Asian, 0.07% from other races, and 0.93% from two or more races. Hispanic or Latino of any race were 0.93% of the population.

There were 723 households, out of which 15.1% had children under 18 living with them, 61.3% were married couples living together, 5.1% had a female householder with no husband present, and 31.5% were non-families. 26.7% of all households were made up of individuals, and 8.7% had someone living alone 65 years of age or older. The average household size was 2.08, and the average family size was 2.48.

The population was spread out in the town, with 12.0% under the age of 18, 4.5% from 18 to 24, 22.5% from 25 to 44, 42.3% from 45 to 64, and 18.7% who were 65 years of age or older. The median age was 50 years. For every 100 females, there were 94.2 males. For every 100 females age 18 and over, there were 91.6 males.

The median income for a household in the town was $47,143, and the median income for a family was $55,875. Males had a median income of $32,708 versus $30,735 for females. The per capita income for the town was $26,759. About 4.1% of families and 5.7% of the population were below the poverty line, including 8.3% of those under age 18 and 3.5% of those age 65 or over.

== New Hanover County School System ==
In this area of North Carolina elementary school children will be zoned for Carolina Beach Elementary School, middle school children zoned for Murray Middle School, and zoned for high school, Eugene Ashley High School or an early college high school including Isaac Bear Early College High School (UNCW) and Cape Fear Community College (CFCC).

Preceded by Carolina Beach	Beaches of Southeastern North Carolina	Succeeded by Fort Fisher
