= National Register of Historic Places listings in New Hanover County, North Carolina =

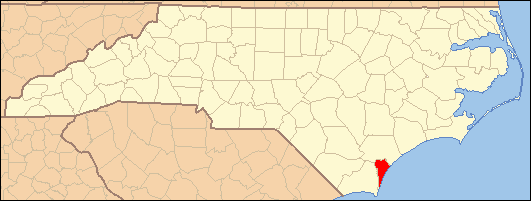

This list includes properties and districts listed on the National Register of Historic Places in New Hanover County, North Carolina. Click the "Map of all coordinates" link to the right to view a Google map of all properties and districts with latitude and longitude coordinates in the table below.

== Current listings ==
This National Park Service list is complete through NPS recent listings posted September 19, 2025.

	Name on the Register	Image	Date listed	Location	City or town	Description
1	Audubon Trolley Station	Audubon Trolley Station	August 5, 1993 (#93000736)	Junction of Park Ave. and Audubon Boulevard; 34°12′55″N 77°53′47″W	Wilmington	
2	Bradley-Latimer Summer House	Bradley-Latimer Summer House	July 20, 1987 (#87001181)	Southern side of NC 1411 east of its junction with U.S. Route 76; 34°12′55″N 77°49′52″W	Wrightsville Beach	
3	Brookwood Historic District	Brookwood Historic District	December 2, 2014 (#14000990)	Roughly bounded by Market St., Keaton Ave., Burnt Mill Creek, and Wallace Park; 34°14′13″N 77°55′02″W	Wilmington	
4	Cape Fear Civil War Shipwreck Discontiguous District		December 23, 1985 (#85003195)	Multiple locations off the North Carolina coast	Kure Beach, Wrightsville Beach and Wilmington Beach	
5	Carolina Heights Historic District	Carolina Heights Historic District	July 29, 1999 (#99000317)	Roughly bounded by Market St., 13th St., Rankin St., and 19th St.; also the 1200 block of Market St. and the 100 and 200 blocks of N. 13th St. 34°14′21″N 77°55′44″W	Wilmington	Second set of addresses represents a boundary increase of November 30, 1999
6	Carolina Place Historic District	Carolina Place Historic District	August 31, 1992 (#92001086)	Bounded by Market St., Wallace Park, Gibson Ave., Wrightsville Ave., and S. 18th St. 34°14′06″N 77°55′24″W	Wilmington	
7	City Hall/Thalian Hall	City Hall/Thalian Hall	April 3, 1970 (#70000464)	100 N. 3rd. St. 34°14′14″N 77°56′48″W	Wilmington	
8	Delgrado School	Delgrado School	October 20, 2001 (#01001135)	1930 Colwell Ave. 34°13′45″N 77°55′21″W	Wilmington	
9	Federal Building and Courthouse	Federal Building and Courthouse	May 2, 1974 (#74001363)	N. Water between Market and Princess St. 34°14′07″N 77°57′00″W	Wilmington	
10	Fort Fisher	Fort Fisher	October 15, 1966 (#66000595)	18 miles south of Wilmington on U.S. Route 421; 33°57′57″N 77°55′37″W	Wilmington	
11	Gabriel's Landing	Gabriel's Landing	May 7, 2008 (#08000382)	1005 Airlie Rd. 34°12′49″N 77°49′18″W	Wilmington	
12	Homesite (31Nh95**1)		March 13, 1997 (#97000165)	Address Restricted	Carolina Beach	
13	William Hooper School (Former)	William Hooper School (Former)	March 12, 1998 (#98000231)	410 Meares St. 34°13′17″N 77°56′34″W	Wilmington	
14	Joy Lee Apartment Building and Annex	Joy Lee Apartment Building and Annex	April 3, 1997 (#97000256)	317 Carolina Beach Ave., N. 34°02′14″N 77°53′30″W	Carolina Beach	
15	Market Street Mansion District	Market Street Mansion District	April 21, 1975 (#75001284)	1704, 1705, 1710, and 1713 Market St. 34°14′12″N 77°55′38″W	Wilmington	
16	Masonboro Sound Historic District		October 22, 1992 (#92001334)	Eastern side of Magnolia Dr. and 7301-7601, 7424, and 7506 Masonboro Sound Rd. 34°10′40″N 77°50′45″W	Wilmington	
17	Mount Lebanon Chapel and Cemetery	Mount Lebanon Chapel and Cemetery	October 16, 1986 (#86002879)	NC 1411; 34°12′50″N 77°49′35″W	Wrightsville Beach	
18	Newton Homesite and Cemetery	Newton Homesite and Cemetery	March 13, 1997 (#97000166)	Off Dow Road South; 34°01′05″N 77°54′47″W	Carolina Beach	
19	James D. and Frances Sprunt Cottage	James D. and Frances Sprunt Cottage	December 18, 2013 (#13000935)	207 N. Lumina Ave. 34°12′39″N 77°47′40″W	Wrightsville Beach	
20	Sunset Park Historic District	Sunset Park Historic District	December 10, 2003 (#03001265)	Roughly bounded by Carolina Beach Rd., Southern Boulevard, Burnett Boulevard, and Sunset Ave. 34°12′14″N 77°56′45″W	Wilmington	
21	Tinga Nursery	Tinga Nursery	October 4, 2000 (#00001185)	U.S. Route 117, 0.62 miles north of its junction with NC 132; 34°17′55″N 77°55′04″W	Wrightsboro	
22	USS NORTH CAROLINA (BB-55) National Historic Landmark	USS NORTH CAROLINA (BB-55) National Historic Landmark	November 10, 1982 (#82004893)	Western bank of the Cape Fear River; 34°14′11″N 77°57′16″W	Wilmington	
23	U.S.S. PETERHOFF		August 6, 1975 (#75001283)	Address Restricted	Fort Fisher	
24	James Walker Nursing School Quarters	James Walker Nursing School Quarters	July 20, 1989 (#89000944)	1020 Rankin St. 34°14′27″N 77°56′11″W	Wilmington	
25	Westbrook-Ardmore Historic District	Westbrook-Ardmore Historic District	February 5, 2009 (#08001414)	Bounded by Dock St., Wrightsville Ave., Queen and Lingo Sts., and by S. 14th St. 34°13′55″N 77°55′40″W	Wilmington	
26	Wilmington Historic and Archeological District	Wilmington Historic and Archeological District	May 6, 1974 (#74001364)	Roughly bounded by Wright, S. 7th, and Harnett Sts., and a north-south line 100 yards west of the North East Cape Fear River; also roughly bounded by Harnett, 7th, 3rd, and Howard, Campbell, 9th, 12th, and Princess, Dock, Castle 8th, and 14th, and 9th, Wright, and Greenfield; 34°14′06″N 77°57′03″W	Wilmington	Second set of boundaries represents a boundary increase of May 1, 2003, the Wilmington Historic District
27	Wilmington National Cemetery	Wilmington National Cemetery	January 31, 1997 (#97000021)	2011 Market St. 34°14′16″N 77°55′33″W	Wilmington	

== See also ==
- National Register of Historic Places listings in North Carolina
- List of National Historic Landmarks in North Carolina
