= List of piers in the United States =

The List of piers in the United States is naming piers in the United States, by state.

== List ==
=== Alabama ===
Partial list of piers in Alabama:
Name	Location	Picture
Fairhope Pier	Fairhope	

=== Alaska ===
Partial list of piers in Alaska:
Name	Location	Picture
Little Campbell Pier	Anchorage	

=== California ===
Partial list of piers in California:
Name	Location	Picture
Avila Beach Pier	Avila Beach	
Berkeley Pier	Berkeley	
Capitola Wharf	Capitola	
Pleasure Pier	Catalina Island	
Cayucos Pier	Cayucos	
	Goleta	
Hermosa Beach Pier	Hermosa Beach	
Huntington Beach Pier	Huntington Beach	
	Long Beach	
Malibu Pier	Malibu	
Manhattan Beach Pier	Manhattan Beach	
Fisherman's Wharf	Monterey	
Balboa Pier	Newport Beach	
Newport Pier	Newport Beach	
	Oakland, California	
	Ocean Beach (San Diego)	
Oceanside Pier	Oceanside	
Pacifica Pier	Pacifica	
Pismo Beach Pier	Pismo Beach	
	Port Hueneme	
	Port San Luis, California (near Avila Beach)	
Redondo Beach pier	Redondo Beach	
	San Clemente	
Crystal Pier	San Diego	
Ocean Beach Municipal Pier	San Diego	
Piers in San Francisco	San Francisco	
	San Mateo	
San Simeon Bay Pier	San Simeon	
Stearns Wharf	Santa Barbara	
	Santa Cruz	
Santa Monica Pier	Santa Monica	
Seal Beach Pier	Seal Beach	
Venice Fishing Pier	Venice, Los Angeles	
Ventura Pier	Ventura	

=== Delaware ===
Partial list of piers in Delaware:
Name	Location	Picture
Bennett's Pier	Milford	
Fishing Pier	Lewes	

=== Florida ===
Partial list of piers in Florida:
Name	Location	Picture
	Clearwater	
	Cocoa Beach	
Daytona Beach Pier	Daytona Beach	
	Fort Myers	
	Naples	
	Pensacola Beach	
Ballast Point Pier	Tampa	
Skyway Fishing Pier	Tampa Bay	

=== Georgia ===
Name	Location	Picture
	Brunswick	
Fisherman's Walk Pier	Tybee Island	
Fishing Pier	Atlanta	
Frank O. Downing Pier	Savannah	
Jekyll Island Fishing Pier	Jekyll Island	
St. Simons Pier	St. Simons Island	
Tivoli River Pier	Richmond Hill	
Tybee Beach Pier	Tybee Island	

=== Hawaii ===
Partial list of piers in Hawaii:
Name	Location	Picture
Mala Wharf	Lahaina	

=== Illinois ===
Partial list of piers in Illinois:
Name	Location	Picture
Casting Pier	Chicago	
Navy Pier	Chicago	
North Pier	Chicago	
Pier 31	Chicago	

=== Indiana ===
Name	Location	Picture
Fishing Pier	Indianapolis	
Lost Marsh Pier	Whiting	
Mohawk Pier	Syracuse	
Northern Pier	North Webster	
Pier Park	South Bend	
The Pier Place	Angola	

=== Maine ===
Partial list of piers in Maine:
Name	Location	Picture
Pier at Old Orchard Beach	Old Orchard Beach	

=== Maryland ===
Partial list of piers in Maryland:
Name	Location	Picture
Broadway Pier	Baltimore	
Chester Park Pier	Dundalk	
Cox Point Pier	Essex	
Fishing Pier	Baltimore	
Fleming Point Pier	Baltimore	
Fort Howard Pier	Baltimore	
Fort Smallwood Pier	Pasadena	
Lake Roland Pier	Baltimore	
Masonville Cove Pier	Baltimore	
Middle Branch Pier	Baltimore	
Pier Six Pavilion	Baltimore	
Stansbury Pier Park	Dundalk	

=== Massachusetts ===
Partial list of piers in Massachusetts:
Name	Location	Picture
Pier in Boston Harbor	Boston	

=== Michigan ===
|+ Partial list of piers in Michigan:

Name	Location	Picture
Fishing Pier	Detroit	
North Fishing Pier	Detroit	
Pier Lake St. Clair	New Baltimore	

=== Minnesota ===
Partial list of piers in Minnesota:
Name	Location	Picture
Brandons Fishing Pier	Duluth	
Crystal Lake Pier	Robbinsdale	
Dower Lake Pier	Staples	
Fishing Pier	Minneapolis	
Indian Point Pier	Duluth	
Lake Nokomis Pier	Minneapolis	
Mission Bridge Pier	Wilton	
Perch Lake Pier	Duluth	
Pier 2	Minneapolis	

=== New Jersey ===
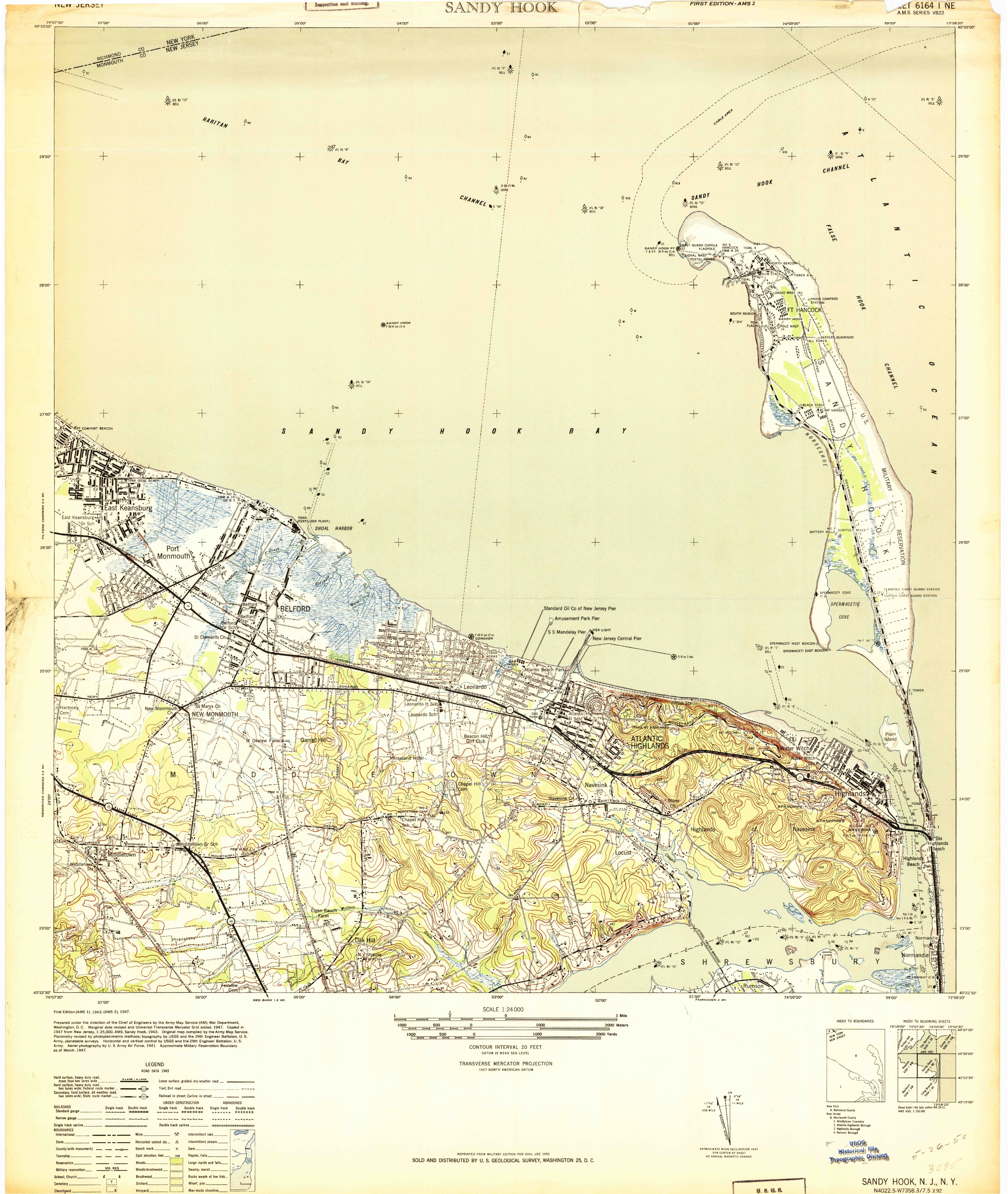
U.S. Geological Survey map showing several piers in New Jersey

Partial list of piers in New Jersey:
Name	Location	Picture
Leonardo Piers	Middletown	
Highlands Pier	Highlands	
Steel Pier	Atlantic City	
Ocean City Music Pier	Ocean City	
Crest Fishing Pier	Wildwood Crest	

=== New York ===
Name	Location	Picture
Chelsea Piers	Chelsea, Manhattan	

=== North Carolina ===
|+ Partial list of piers in North Carolina:

Name	Location	Picture
	Avon	
Carolina Beach Pier	Carolina Beach	
	Emerald Isle	
	Kill Devil Hills	
	Kitty Hawk	
	Kure Beach	
Three different fishing piers	Nags Head	
	Rodanthe	

=== Ohio ===
Name	Location	Picture
Bradstreet Fishing Pier	Rocky River	
Edgewater Pier	Cleveland	
Fairport Harbor Pier	Fairport Harbor	
Mile Ling Pier	Lorain, Ohio	
Miller Road Pier	Avon Lake	
Nickel Plate Pier	Huron	
Pier 11	Whitehall	
Pier Pub	Huron	
Pier W	Lakewood	
State Fishing Pier	Port Clinton	
The Scranton Pier	Cleveland	

=== Oregon ===
|+ Partial list of piers in Oregon:

Name	Location	Picture
Bay Street Pier	Newport	
Newport Municipal Pier	Newport	

=== Pennsylvania ===
Name	Location	Picture
Cherry Street Pier	Philadelphia	
Fishing Pier	Philadelphia	
Morgan's Pier	Philadelphia	
Pier 3	Philadelphia	
Pier 68	Philadelphia	
Race Street Pier	Philadelphia	
Washington Avenue Pier	Philadelphia	

=== South Carolina ===
|+ Partial list of piers in South Carolina:

Name	Location	Picture
Charleston Pier	Charleston	

=== Virginia ===
Name	Location	Picture
Lynnhaven Inlet Pier	Virginia Beach	

=== Virgin Islands ===
Name	Location	Picture
Frederiksted Pier	Saint Croix	

=== Washington ===
|+ Partial list of piers in Washington:

Name	Location	Picture
Percival Landing Park	Olympia	
Central Waterfront piers 46 through 70, The Edgewater, Colman Dock	Seattle	
Dash Point Pier	Tacoma	
Les Davis Pier	Tacoma	

=== Wisconsin ===
|+ Partial list of piers in Wisconsin:

Name	Location	Picture
McKinley Park Pier	Milwaukee	
Pier Wisconsin	Milwaukee	
Racine South Pier	Racine	
South Metro Pier	Oak Creek	

== See also ==
- List of piers
