= Cape Fear Civil War Shipwreck Discontiguous District =

Historic district in North Carolina, United States

- U.S. National Register of Historic Places
- U.S. Historic district
- Nearest city: Holden Beach, Topsail Beach, Wrightsville Beach, Kure Beach, and Wilmington Beach, North Carolina
- Area: 295.8 acres (119.7 ha)
- Architect: Thompson, Capt. Nathaniel Lord; Et al.
- Architectural style: Mixed (more than 2 styles from different periods), Sidewheel Steamer
- NRHP reference No.: 85003195
- Added to NRHP: December 23, 1985

The Cape Fear Civil War Shipwreck Discontiguous District is a historic district encompassing a collection of shipwrecks in the Cape Fear area of southeastern North Carolina. The district includes several clusters of underwater archaeological resources associated with as many as 21 shipwrecks dating to the American Civil War. The district was listed on the National Register of Historic Places in 1985.

== List of shipwrecks ==
- Ranger
- Ella
- USS Peterhoff
- Beauregard
- Sophia
- Wild Dayrell
- Phantom
- Douro
- Hebe
- Venus
- Lynx
- USS Iron Age
- Bendigo
- Elizabeth
- Stormy Petrel
- USS Aster
- Arabian
- Louisiana
- Condor
- CSS Raleigh
- Modern Greece
- one unknown vessel (site 0007NEI)

== See also ==
- National Register of Historic Places listings in Brunswick County, North Carolina
- National Register of Historic Places listings in New Hanover County, North Carolina
