= Carolina Beach Pier =

Public fishing pier in the United States

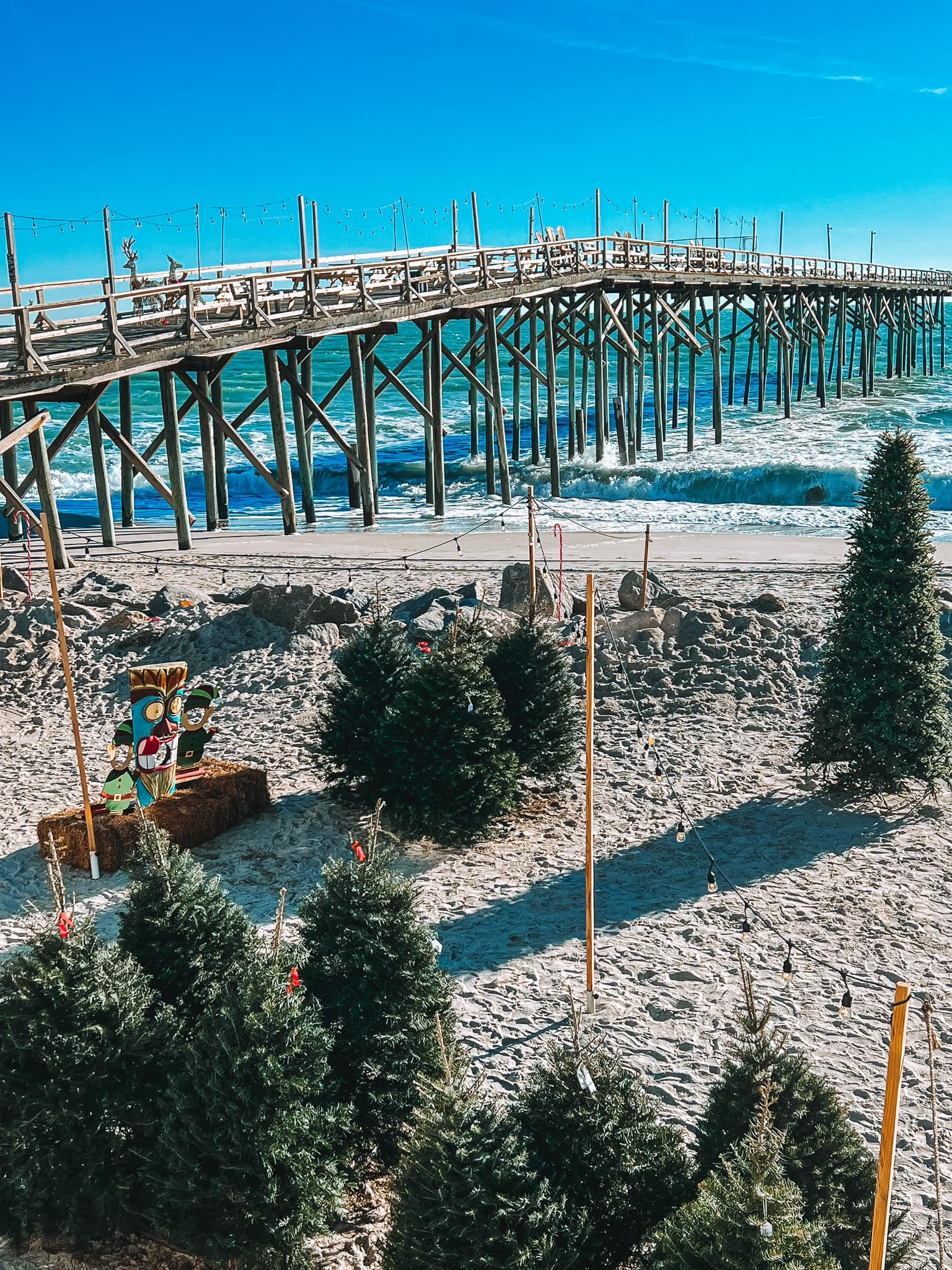
- Carolina Beach Pier Christmas Trees
- Type: Pleasure Pier, Amusement Pier
- Spans: Atlantic Ocean
- Location: Carolina Beach, North Carolina
- Coordinates: 34.05838699852252°N 77.87846659629798°W
- Toll: Open to the Public

Characteristics
- Total length: 669 feet (204 m)

History
- Opening date: 1946
- Location in Southeastern North Carolina

The Carolina Beach Pier is a pleasure, fishing, and amusement pier located in the town of Carolina Beach, North Carolina, between the Cape Fear River and Atlantic Ocean, north of Fort Fisher and south of Freeman Park. At 669 feet (204 m) in length, it is one of the longest standing wooden piers in the United States. The deck of the pier is 25 feet (7.6 m) above sea level, while the top of the restaurant structure at the base of the pier is 40 feet (12 m).

One of the main landmarks of Carolina Beach, the pier is an iconic fixture in the town's prominent beach culture and features one of the most expansive views on the Southeastern shoreline, offering a nearly 270-degree vantage point of marsh and oceanfront. A popular meeting place for surfers, it is the location of various surfing competitions throughout the year. It is also the filming location for various television series and movies.

== History ==
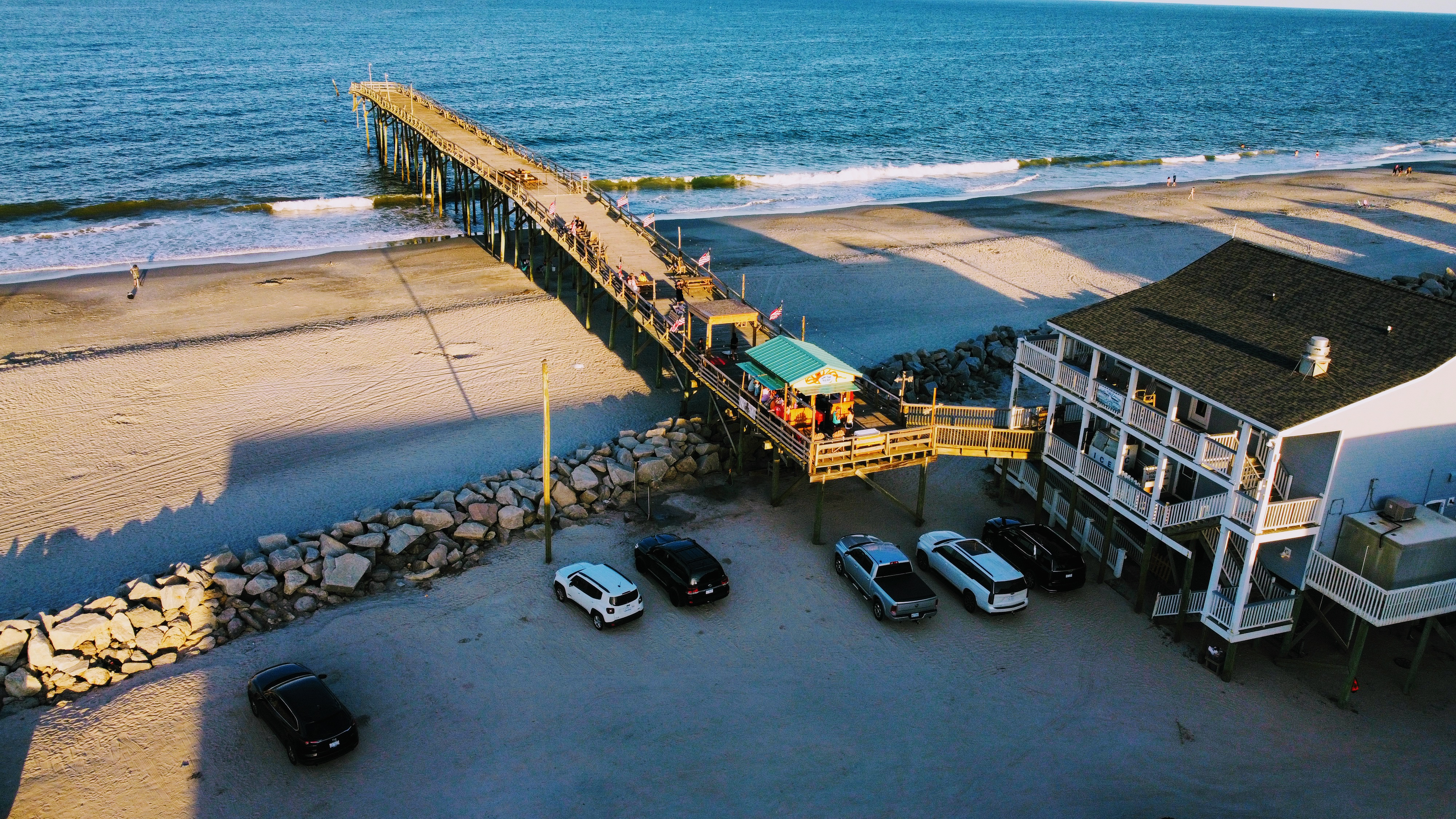
The Pier and pier house

The pier was built in 1946, shortly after the incorporation of Carolina Beach in 1925. The pier was rebuilt after sustaining damage from Hurricane Hazel in 1954. Originally 1,000 feet in length, the pier lost 320 feet after it was damaged by Hurricane Florence in 2018. In 2022 the United States Army Corps of Engineers announced a $20 million project to re-nourish the beaches that would provide protection from erosion and other effects from coastal storms.

The pier sits on a 1.7-acre parcel of land, and is connected to a two-story building constructed in 1998, which holds a small lounge and kitchen. The Low Tide Tiki Bar was constructed in 2020 and is affixed to the pier. The pier also has a parking lot sized to fit up to 100 vehicles.

== Pier Re-Opening ==
The pier was sold in 2022 in a private transaction. The pier hosts various community events around the year for the Carolina Beach community, including a Christmas tree lot and pumpkin patch.

== See also ==
- List of piers
- List of piers in the United States
- Tourist attractions in the United States
- National Piers Society
