= Newton Homesite and Cemetery =

Historic cemetery in North Carolina, United States

- U.S. National Register of Historic Places
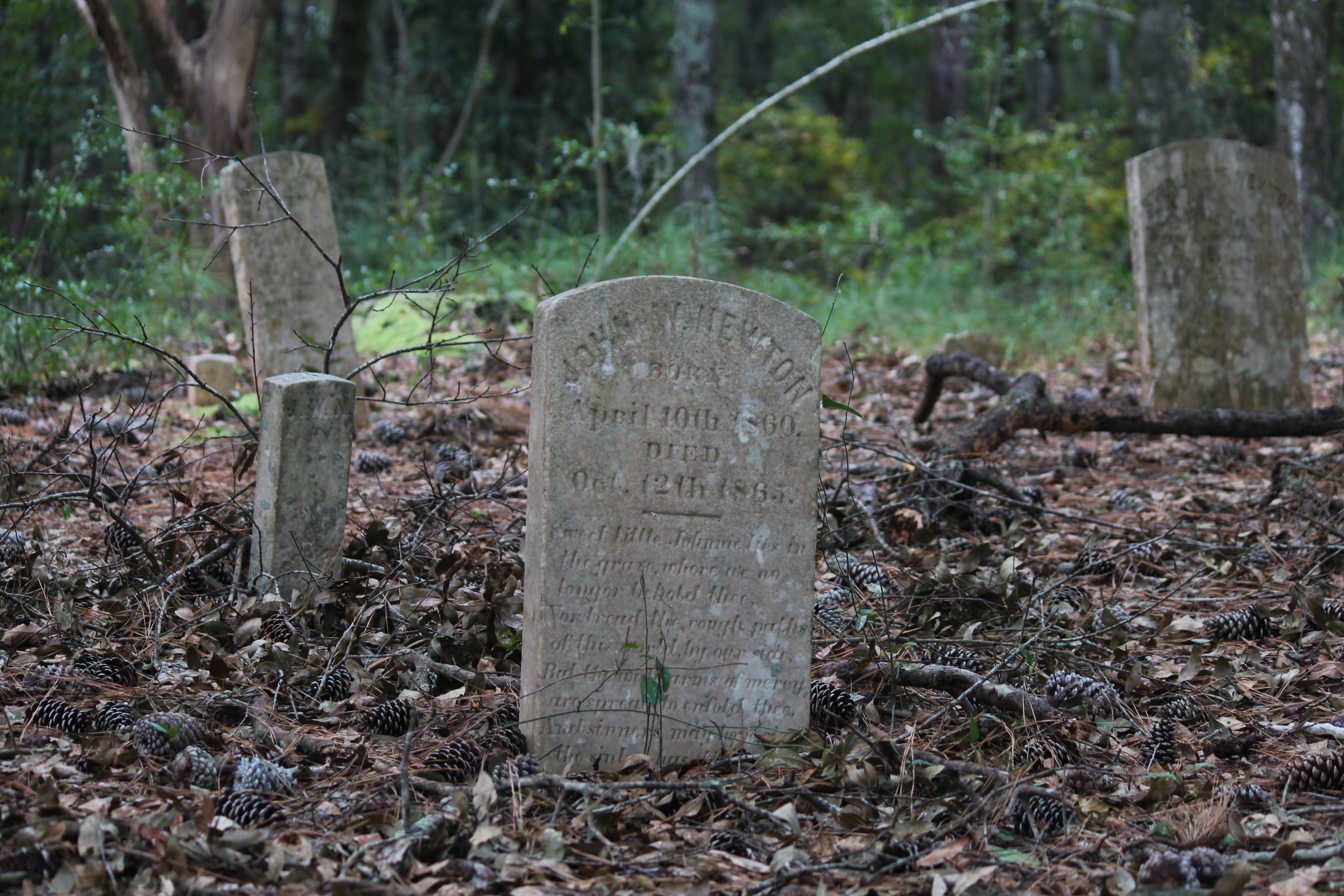

- Location within North Carolina Location within the United States
- Nearest city: Carolina Beach, North Carolina
- Coordinates: 34°1′5″N 77°54′47″W
- Area: 4 acres (1.6 ha)
- NRHP reference No.: 97000166
- Added to NRHP: March 13, 1997

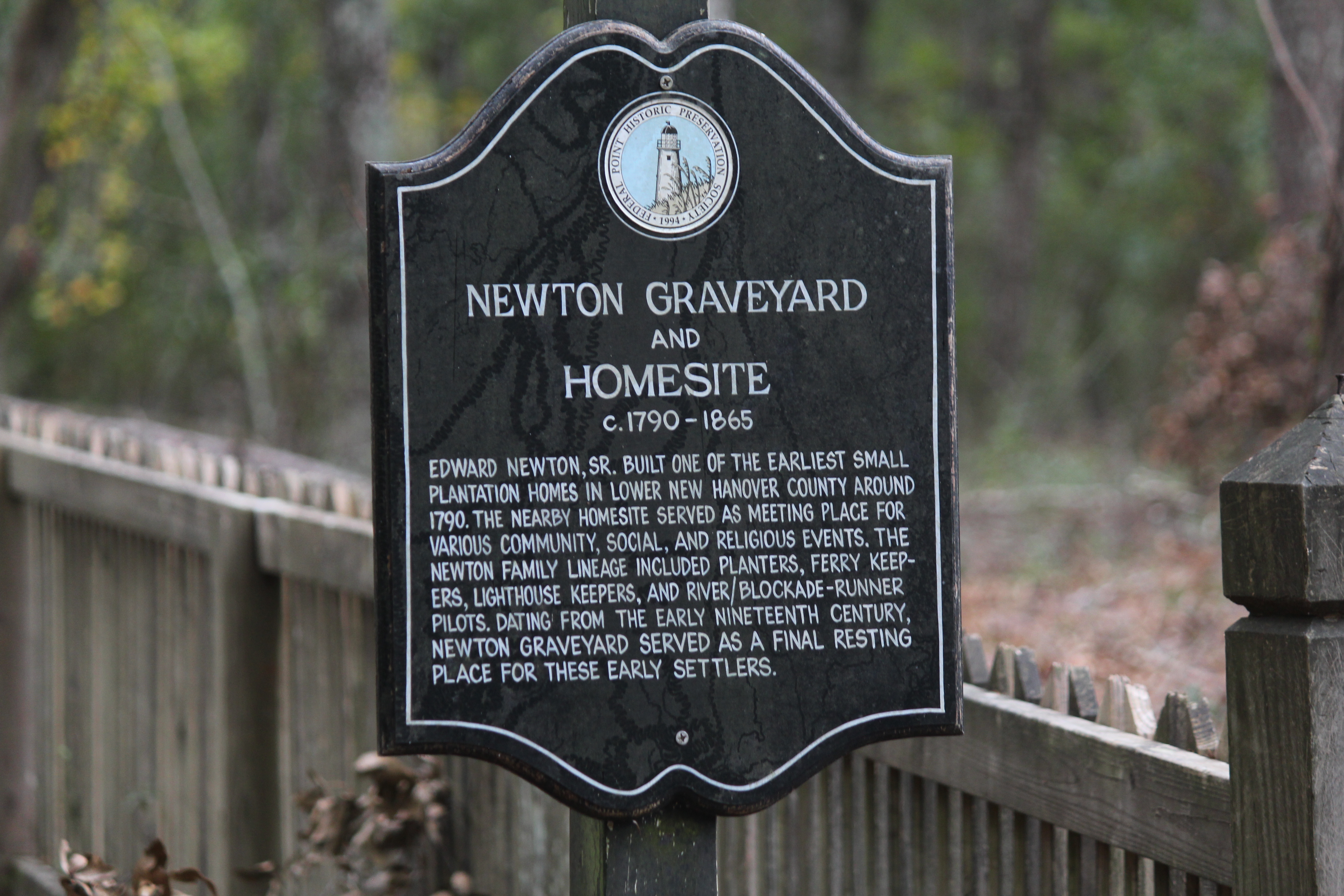
Historic marker at the site

The Newton Homesite and Cemetery are a remnant of the earliest settlement of the outer coast of North Carolina near Carolina Beach. The site is located southwest of Carolina Beach off Dow Road South, adjacent to the Federal Point Methodist Cemetery. It includes a small cemetery of its own, and the archaeological remains of an early homestead, dating to the early 18th century, and that of an early 19th-century homestead.

The site was listed on the National Register of Historic Places in 1997.

== See also ==
- National Register of Historic Places listings in New Hanover County, North Carolina
