= Westbrook–Ardmore Historic District =

Historic district in North Carolina, United States

- U.S. National Register of Historic Places
- U.S. Historic district
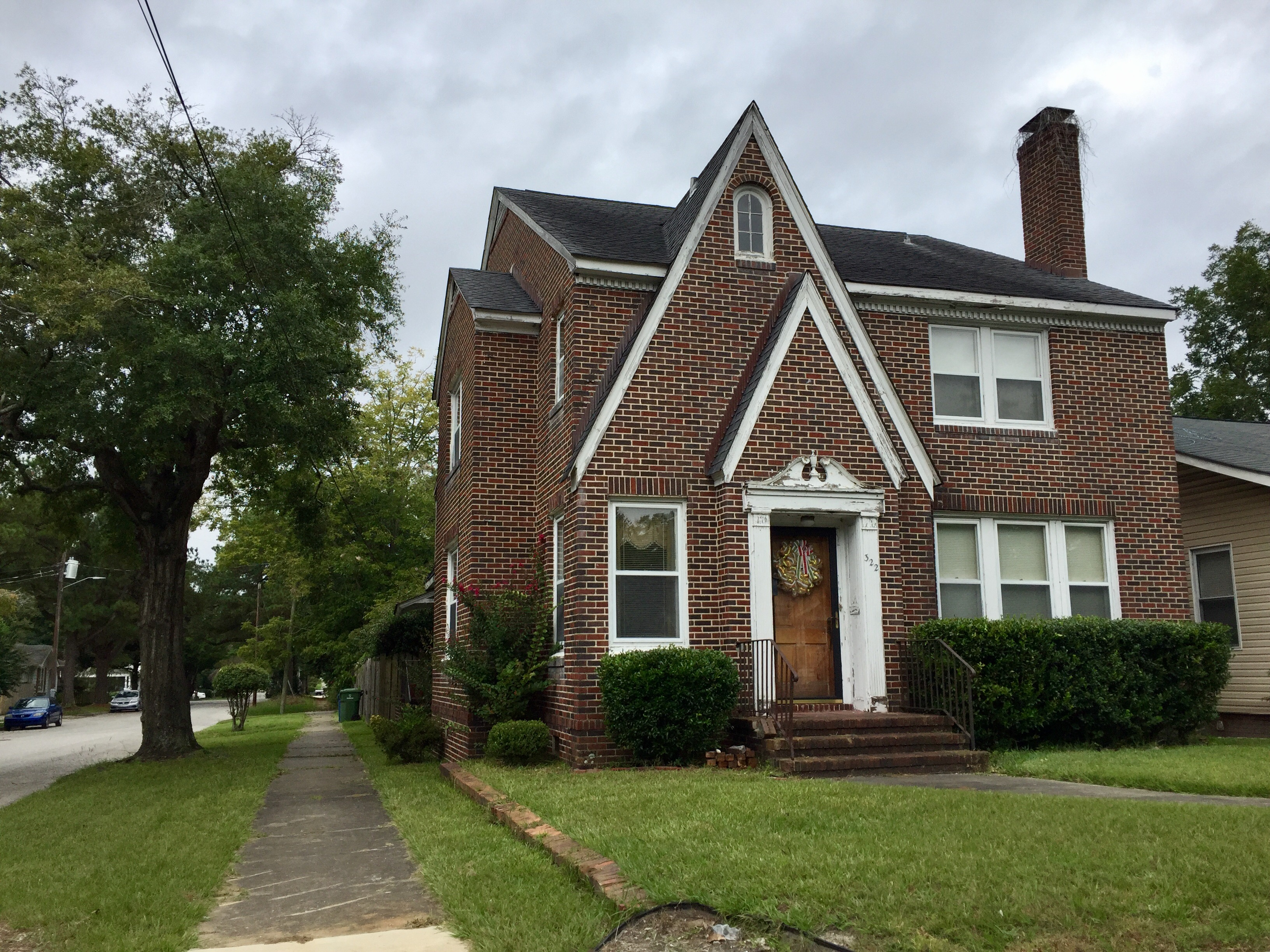

- Location within North Carolina Location within the United States
- Location: Bounded by Dock St., Wrightsville Ave., Queen and Lingo Sts., and by S. 14th St., Wilmington, North Carolina
- Coordinates: 34°13′55″N 77°55′40″W
- Area: 134 acres (54 ha)
- Built: 1914
- Architect: Lynch and Foard; Fore and Foster
- Architectural style: Bungalow/craftsman, Colonial Revival
- NRHP reference No.: 08001414
- Added to NRHP: February 5, 2009

Westbrook–Ardmore Historic District is a national historic district located at Wilmington, New Hanover County, North Carolina. The district encompasses 467 contributing buildings in a predominantly residential section of Wilmington. The district developed as six interrelated early-20th century subdivisions between about 1914 and 1956 and includes notable examples of Colonial Revival and Bungalow / American Craftsman style architecture. Notable buildings include St. Matthew's Evangelical Lutheran Church (1942), Central Church of Christ (c. 1956), Saint Mark Freewill Baptist Church (c. 1945), the Mills Store (1947), "English Cottage Style" former Pure Oil station (1936), and Art Moderne style Traveler's Service Station #3 (c. 1951).

It was listed on the National Register of Historic Places in 2009.
