= Bradley-Latimer Summer House =

Historic house in North Carolina, United States

- U.S. National Register of Historic Places
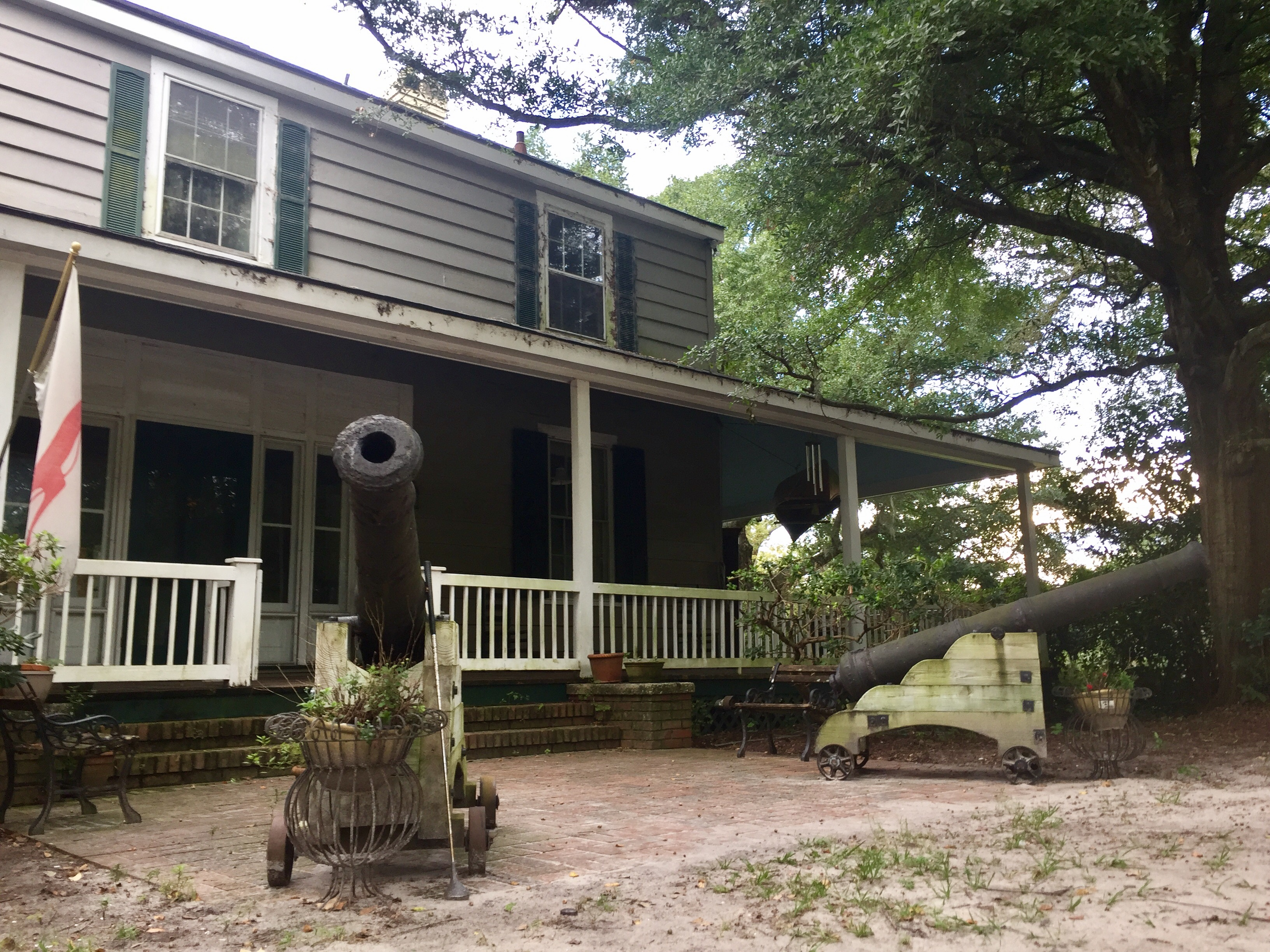

- Location within North Carolina Location within the United States
- Location: S side SR 1411 E of jct. with US 76, Wrightsville Beach, North Carolina
- Coordinates: 34°12′55″N 77°49′52″W
- Area: 4.3 acres (1.7 ha)
- Built: c. 1855
- NRHP reference No.: 87001181
- Added to NRHP: July 20, 1987

Bradley-Latimer Summer House is a historic home located at Wrightsville Beach, New Hanover County, North Carolina. It was built about 1855, and is a picturesque, two-story, three bays wide by two bays deep, hipped-roof dwelling. It features a broad, one-story veranda encompassing the entire structure.

It was listed on the National Register of Historic Places in 1987.
