= Gabriel's Landing =

Historic house in North Carolina, United States

- U.S. National Register of Historic Places
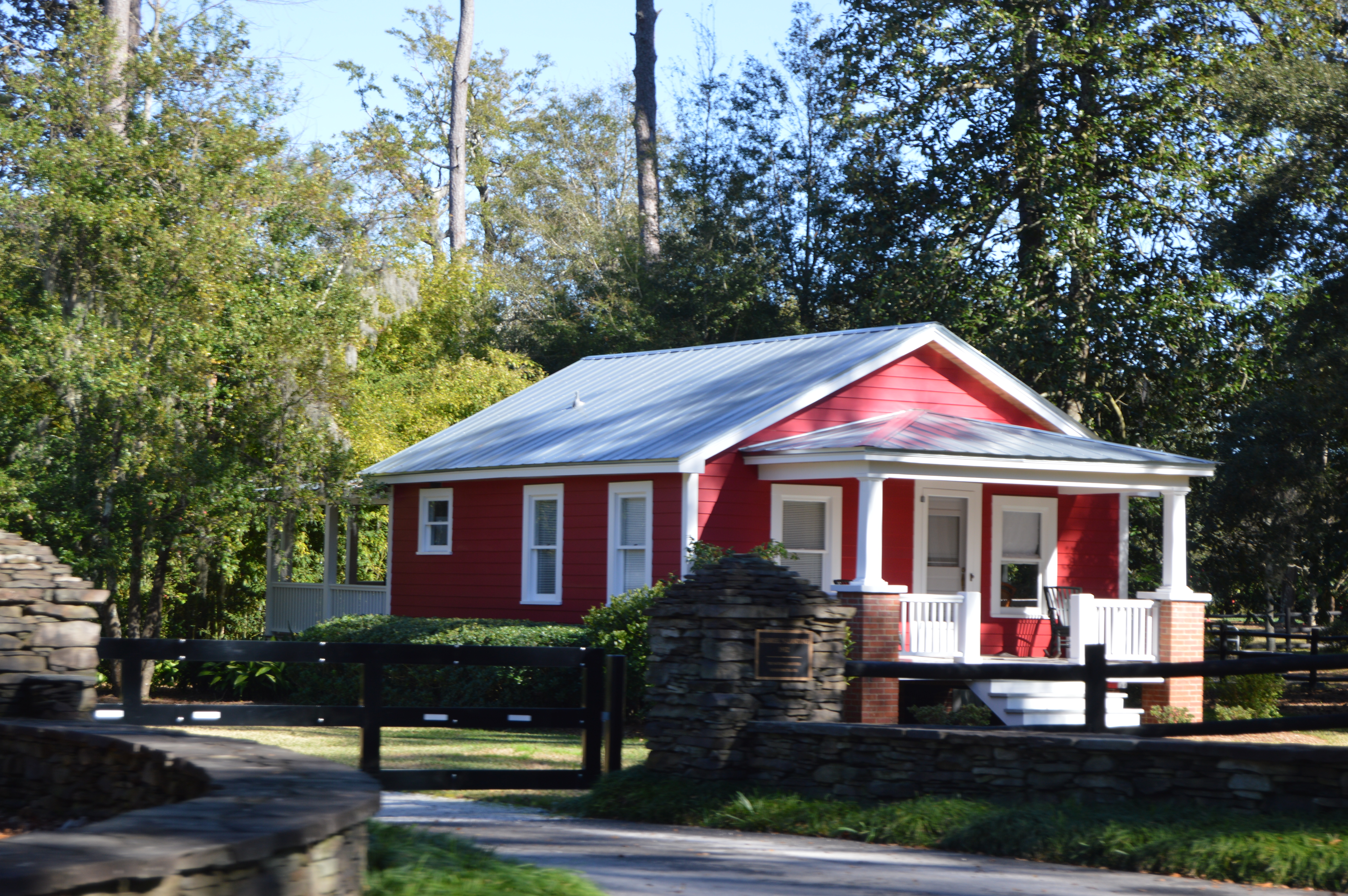
- Roadside cottage

- Location within North Carolina Location within the United States
- Location: 1005 Airlie Rd., Wilmington, North Carolina
- Coordinates: 34°12′50″N 77°49′27″W
- Area: 38.7 acres (15.7 ha)
- Built: 1936
- Architect: Willis Irvin
- Architectural style: Colonial Revival
- NRHP reference No.: 08000382
- Added to NRHP: May 7, 2008

Gabriel's Landing, also known as Old Oak Point, is a historic estate located at Wilmington, New Hanover County, North Carolina. The main house was built 1936, and consists of a 1 1/2-story, five-bay, central section flanked by one-story recessed wings in the Colonial Revival style. The front facade features a one-story piazza, and the house has a ceramic tile shingle roof. Also on the property is a contributing cottage (c. 1936), cabin (c. 1936), two-story barn (c. 1936), and stable (c. 1936).

It was listed on the National Register of Historic Places in 2008.
