= Carolina Heights Historic District =

Historic district in North Carolina, United States

- U.S. National Register of Historic Places
- U.S. Historic district
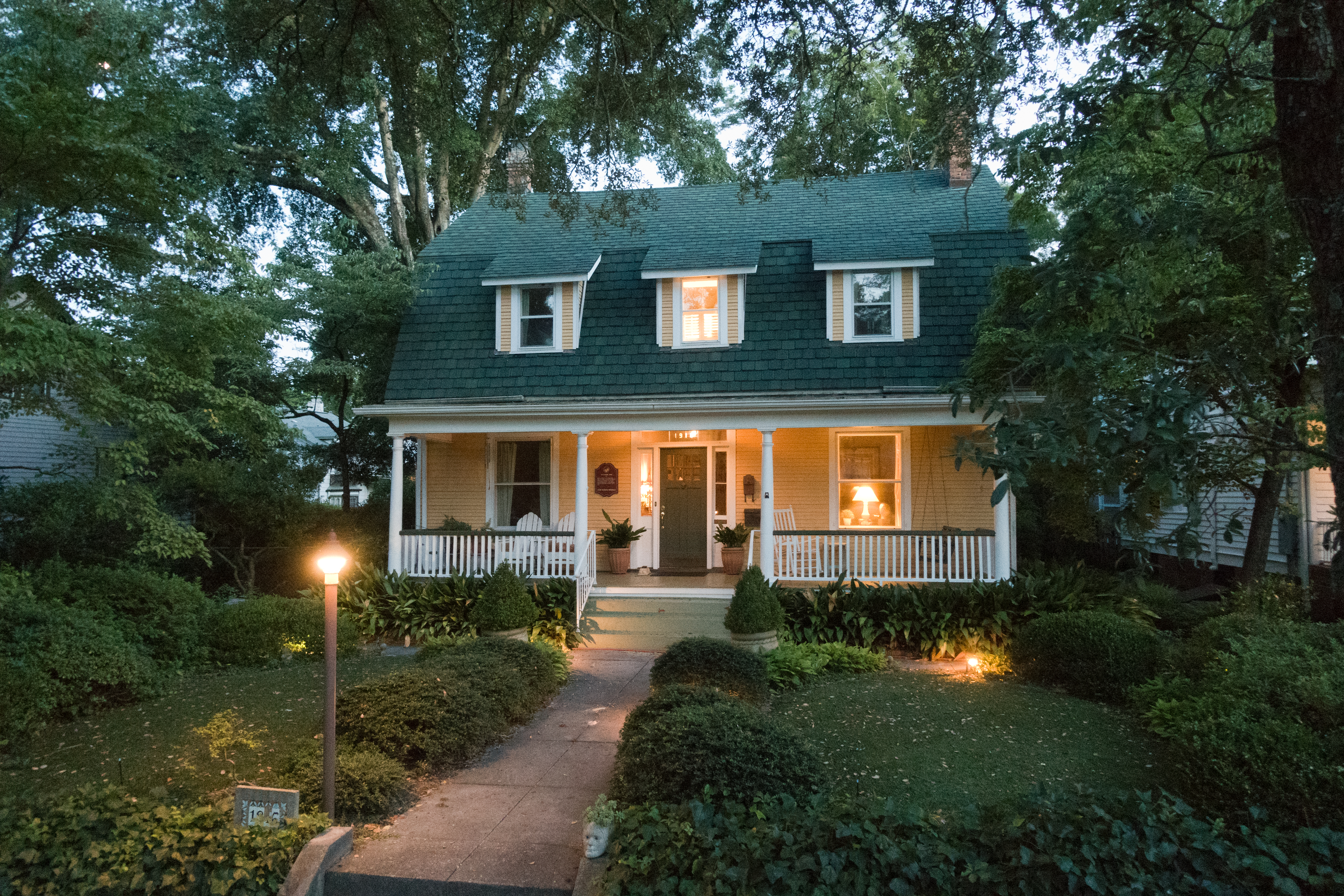
- Hazelhurt House

- Location within North Carolina Location within the United States
- Location: Roughly bounded by Market St., Thirteenth St., Rankin St. and Nineteenth St., Wilmington, North Carolina
- Coordinates: 34°14′19″N 77°55′59″W
- Area: 81.5 acres (33.0 ha)
- Built: c. 1908
- Architect: Stephens, Burett; Gause, James F., et al.
- Architectural style: Queen Anne, Colonial Revival, Classical Revival
- NRHP reference No.: 99000317, 99001448 (Boundary Increase)
- Added to NRHP: July 29, 1999, November 30, 1999 (Boundary Increase)

Carolina Heights Historic District is a national historic district located at Wilmington, New Hanover County, North Carolina. The district encompasses 421 contributing buildings, 1 contributing site, and 1 contributing object in a predominantly residential section of Wilmington. The district developed as planned suburban areas between about 1908 and 1950 and includes notable examples of Queen Anne, Classical Revival, Colonial Revival, and Bungalow / American Craftsman style architecture. Notable buildings include the New Hanover High School (1922), the Trinity Methodist Episcopal Church (1921), St. Paul's Episcopal Church (1927/1956-1958), First Church of Christ, Scientist (1928), Sinclair Service Station (c. 1936), and Yopp Funeral Home (1936).

It was listed on the National Register of Historic Places in 1999, with a boundary increase in 1999.

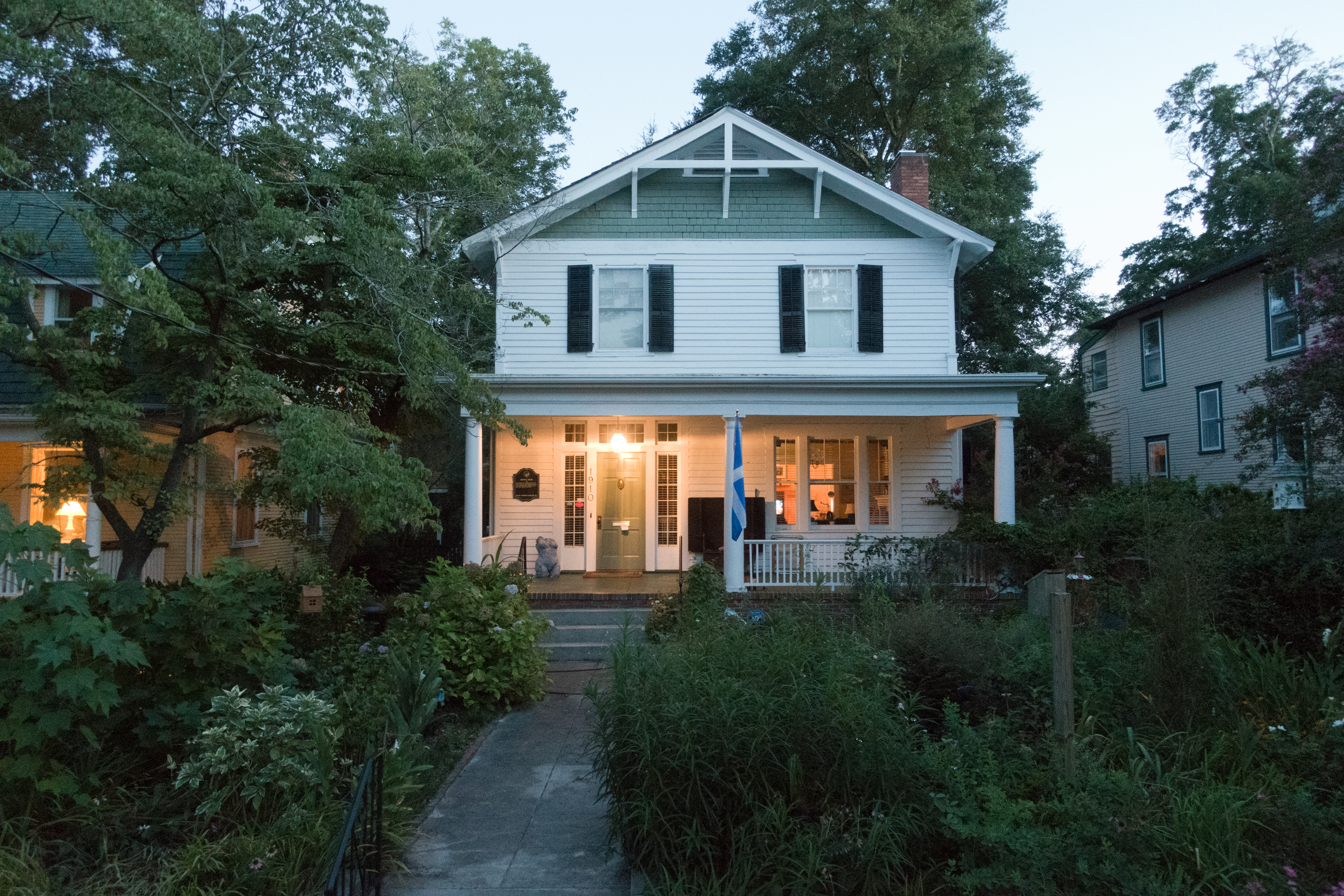
Jarman House
