= Brookwood Historic District =

Historic district in North Carolina, United States

- U.S. National Register of Historic Places
- U.S. Historic district
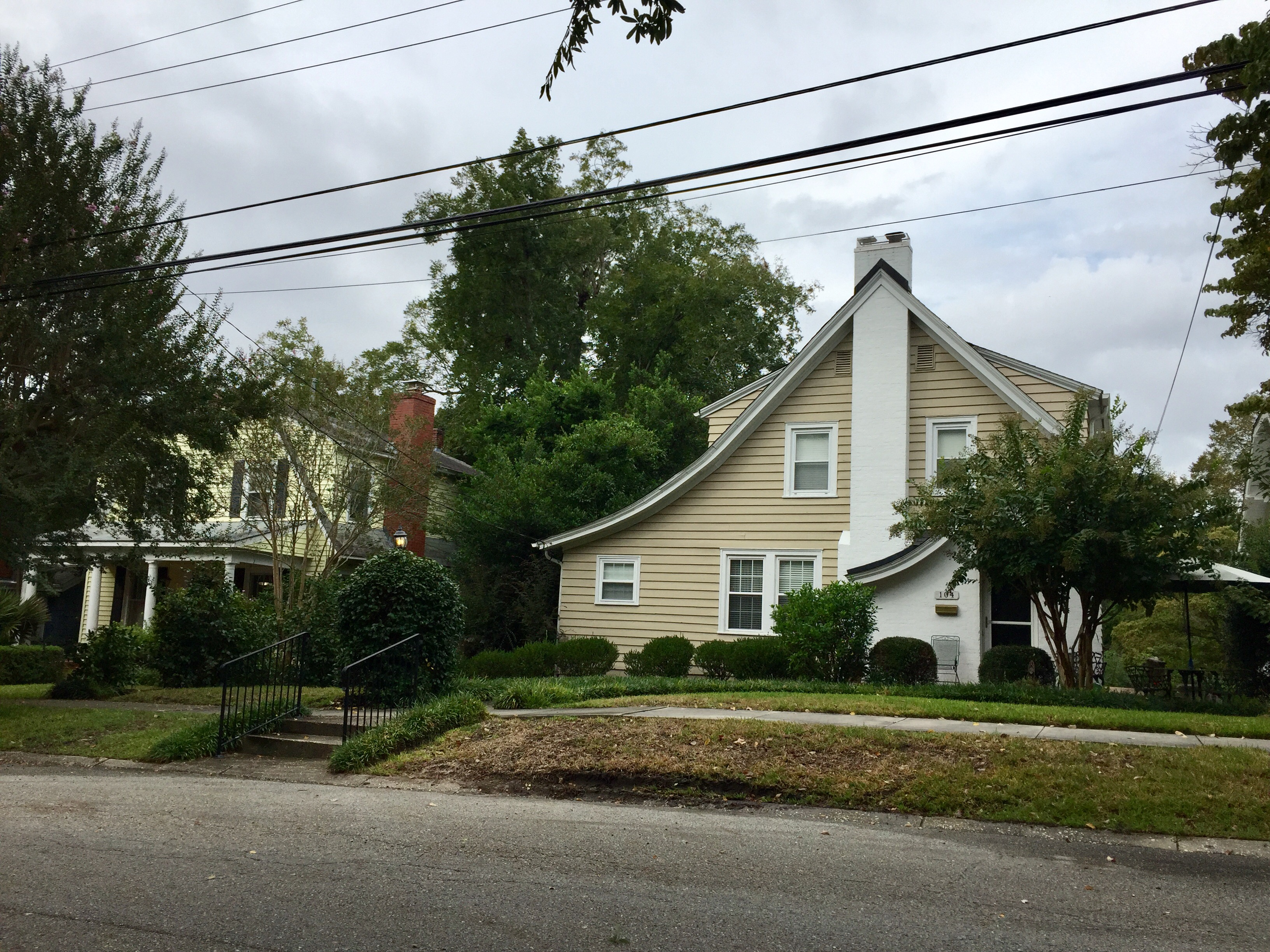

- Location within North Carolina Location within the United States
- Location: Roughly bounded by Market St., Keaton Ave., Burnt Mill Cr. & Wallace Park, Wilmington, North Carolina
- Coordinates: 34°14′13″N 77°55′02″W
- Area: 58 acres (23 ha)
- Built: c. 1920
- Architectural style: Colonial Revival, Bungalow / Craftsman
- NRHP reference No.: 14000990
- Added to NRHP: December 2, 2014

Brookwood Historic District is a national historic district located at Wilmington, New Hanover County, North Carolina. The district encompasses 166 contributing buildings, 1 contributing site, 1 contributing structure, and 1 contributing object in a predominantly residential section of Wilmington. The district developed as planned suburban areas between about 1920 and 1964 and includes notable examples of Colonial Revival, and Bungalow / American Craftsman style architecture. Notable contributing resources include Brookwood Park, the Church of Jesus Christ of Latter Day Saints, Robert F. Rankin House, and Thomas E. Moody House.

It was listed on the National Register of Historic Places in 2014.
