= Sea Breeze, North Carolina =

- CDP
- Location in New Hanover County and the state of North Carolina.
- Coordinates: 34°04′11″N 77°53′47″W
- Country: United States
- State: North Carolina
- County: New Hanover

Area
  - Total: 2.09 sq mi (5.41 km^{2})
  - Land: 1.86 sq mi (4.83 km^{2})
  - Water: 0.23 sq mi (0.59 km^{2})
- Elevation: 13 ft (4.0 m)

Population (2020)
  - Total: 2,245
  - Density: 1,204.4/sq mi (465.01/km^{2})
- Time zone: UTC-5 (Eastern (EST))
  - Summer (DST): UTC-4 (EDT)
- FIPS code: 37-60000
- GNIS feature ID: 2402834

Sea Breeze is a census-designated place (CDP) in New Hanover County, North Carolina, United States. As of the 2020 census, Sea Breeze had a population of 2,245. It is part of the Wilmington Metropolitan Statistical Area.

== Geography ==
According to the United States Census Bureau, the CDP has a total area of 1.6 square miles (4.1 km^{2}), all land.

== Demographics ==
Historical population
Census	Pop.	Note	%±
2000	1,312		—
2010	1,969		50.1%
2020	2,245		14.0%
U.S. Decennial Census

=== 2020 census ===
As of the 2020 census, Sea Breeze had a population of 2,245. The median age was 53.6 years. 12.9% of residents were under the age of 18 and 31.4% of residents were 65 years of age or older. For every 100 females there were 93.7 males, and for every 100 females age 18 and over there were 92.6 males age 18 and over.

100.0% of residents lived in urban areas, while 0.0% lived in rural areas.

There were 986 households in Sea Breeze, of which 17.6% had children under the age of 18 living in them. Of all households, 57.3% were married-couple households, 16.3% were households with a male householder and no spouse or partner present, and 21.0% were households with a female householder and no spouse or partner present. About 22.7% of all households were made up of individuals and 13.0% had someone living alone who was 65 years of age or older.

There were 1,113 housing units, of which 11.4% were vacant. The homeowner vacancy rate was 1.9% and the rental vacancy rate was 10.3%.

Racial composition as of the 2020 census
Race	Number	Percent
White	1,918	85.4%
Black or African American	140	6.2%
American Indian and Alaska Native	9	0.4%
Asian	25	1.1%
Native Hawaiian and Other Pacific Islander	0	0.0%
Some other race	31	1.4%
Two or more races	122	5.4%
Hispanic or Latino (of any race)	67	3.0%

=== 2000 census ===
As of the census of 2000, there were 1,312 people, 546 households, and 407 families residing in the CDP. The population density was 806.0 inhabitants per square mile (311.2/km^{2}). There were 643 housing units at an average density of 395.0 per square mile (152.5/km^{2}). The racial makeup of the CDP was 81.94% White, 15.85% African American, 0.38% Native American, 0.61% Asian, 0.23% from other races, and 0.99% from two or more races. Hispanic or Latino of any race were 1.52% of the population.

There were 546 households, out of which 23.6% had children under the age of 18 living with them, 65.0% were married couples living together, 6.8% had a female householder with no husband present, and 25.3% were non-families. 19.2% of all households were made up of individuals, and 7.0% had someone living alone who was 65 years of age or older. The average household size was 2.40 and the average family size was 2.74.

In the CDP, the population was spread out, with 18.4% under the age of 18, 5.5% from 18 to 24, 25.1% from 25 to 44, 34.5% from 45 to 64, and 16.6% who were 65 years of age or older. The median age was 46 years. For every 100 females, there were 97.9 males. For every 100 females age 18 and over, there were 93.7 males.

The median income for a household in the CDP was $41,836, and the median income for a family was $46,023. Males had a median income of $32,120 versus $26,029 for females. The per capita income for the CDP was $21,608. About 13.2% of families and 14.1% of the population were below the poverty line, including 29.3% of those under age 18 and 14.0% of those age 65 or over.
