= Masonboro Sound Historic District =

Historic district in North Carolina, United States

- U.S. National Register of Historic Places
- U.S. Historic district
- Location within North Carolina Location within the United States
- Location: Bounded by Market St., Wallace Park, Gibson Ave., Wrightsville Ave. and S. Eighteenth St., Wilmington, North Carolina
- Coordinates: 34°10′40″N 77°50′45″W
- Area: 282 acres (114 ha)
- Built: c. 1835, c. 1870-1942
- Architect: Henry Bacon, Et al.
- Architectural style: Late 19th And 20th Century Revivals, Colonial Revival, Italian Renaissance
- NRHP reference No.: 92001334
- Added to NRHP: October 22, 1992

Masonboro Sound Historic District is a national historic district located near Wilmington, New Hanover County, North Carolina. The district encompasses 22 contributing buildings, 2 contributing sites, 8 contributing structures, and 1 contributing object near Wilmington. The district developed during the 19th and early-20th century and includes notable examples of Italian Renaissance and Colonial Revival style architecture. There are 10 contributing dwellings and 13 contributing outbuildings. Notable dwellings include the Carr-Ormand House (1932), Willard-Sprunt-Woolvin House (1880), Cazaux-Williams-Crow House (Halcyon Hall, 1877, 1880s, 1937), Parsley-Love House (Hickory Hill, 1885, 1912), Live Oaks (1913), Taylor-Bissinger House (1937), the "Doll House" (1924), and Hill-Anderson Cottage (c. 1835).

It was listed on the National Register of Historic Places in 1992.
