= Carolina Beach, North Carolina =

Carolina Beach
- Town
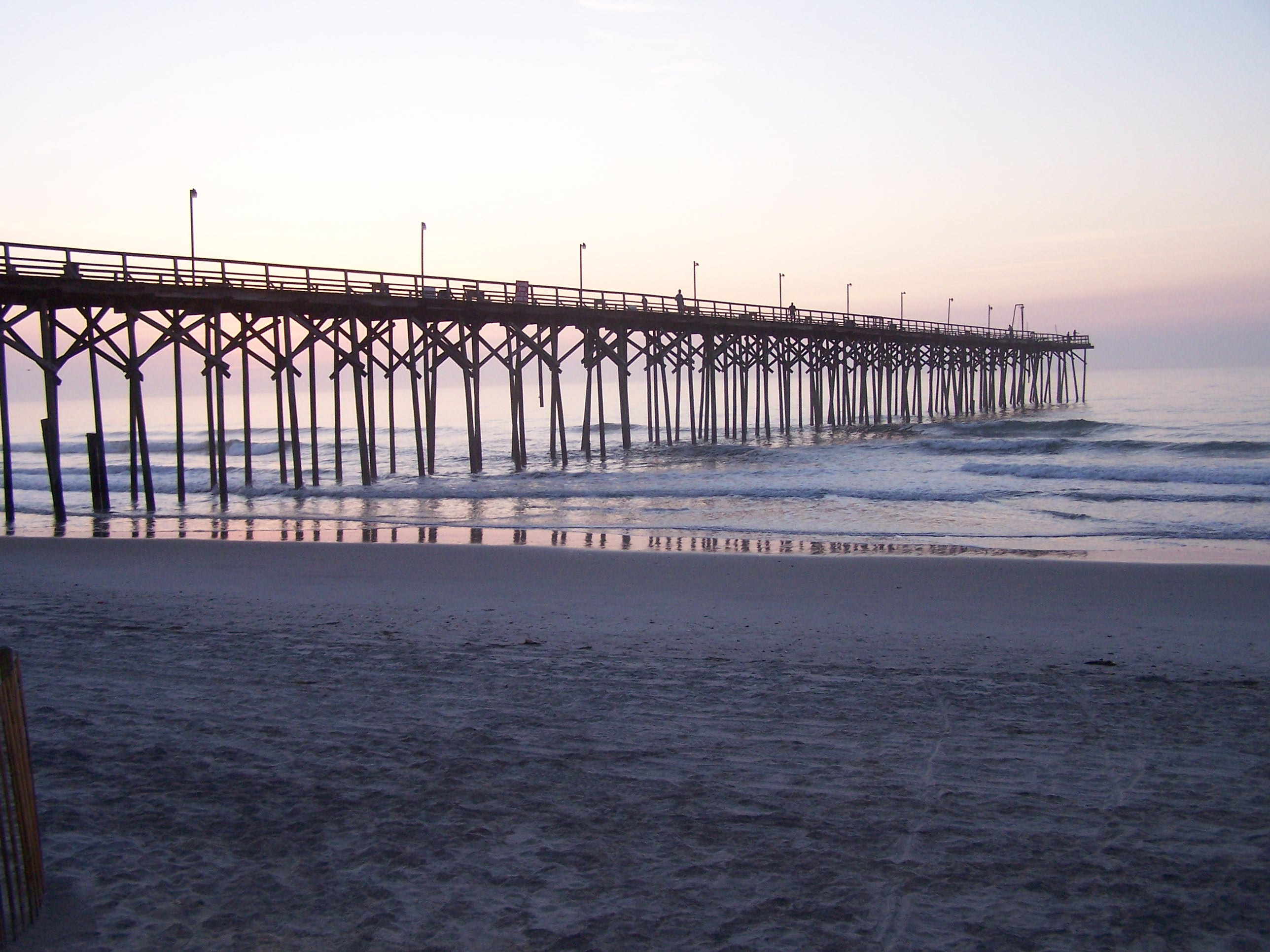
- Carolina Beach Pier

- Flag Seal
- Nickname: C.B.
- Motto: "Relax, you’re here."
- Location in New Hanover County and the state of North Carolina
- Coordinates: 34°02′23″N 77°53′46″W
- Country: United States
- State: North Carolina
- County: New Hanover

Government
  - Type: Council-Manager
  - Mayor: Lynn Barbee
  - Mayor Pro Tem: Jay Healy

Area
  - Total: 2.74 sq mi (7.09 km^{2})
  - Land: 2.45 sq mi (6.35 km^{2})
  - Water: 0.29 sq mi (0.74 km^{2})
- Elevation: 13 ft (4.0 m)

Population (2020)
  - Total: 6,564
  - Density: 2,677.0/sq mi (1,033.61/km^{2})
- Time zone: UTC-5 (Eastern (EST))
  - Summer (DST): UTC-4 (EDT)
- ZIP code: 28428
- Area codes: 910, 472
- FIPS code: 37-10500
- GNIS feature ID: 2405381
- Website: www.carolinabeach.gov

Carolina Beach is a beach town in New Hanover County, North Carolina, United States, situated about 12 miles (19 km) south of Wilmington International Airport in southeastern coastal North Carolina. As of the 2020 census, the city population was 6,564. It is part of the Wilmington metropolitan area. The community of Wilmington Beach was annexed by the town in 2000.

Carolina Beach lies at the northern end of Pleasure Island, which it shares with the community of Kure Beach, south of the inlet that separates the island from the unincorporated community of Sea Breeze. The town has a land area of 2.45 square miles (6.3 km^{2}), extending along the island from Freeman Park in the north to Alabama Avenue in the south. The town borders Kure Beach, which is directly to the south of Carolina Beach. During the summer months, the town of Carolina Beach has live Beach music every Friday night on the boardwalk right near town center.

== Geography ==
According to the United States Census Bureau, the town has a total area of 2.5 square miles (6.5 km^{2}). 2.2 square miles (5.7 km^{2}) of it is land and 0.2 square miles (0.52 km^{2}) of it (8.13%) is water.

== Demographics ==
Historical population
Census	Pop.	Note	%±
1930	95		—
1940	637		570.5%
1950	1,080		69.5%
1960	1,192		10.4%
1970	1,663		39.5%
1980	2,000		20.3%
1990	3,630		81.5%
2000	4,701		29.5%
2010	5,706		21.4%
2020	6,564		15.0%
U.S. Decennial Census

=== 2020 census ===
As of the 2020 census, there were 6,564 people and 3,090 households in the town, including 1,764 family households.

The median age was 50.8 years. 15.7% of residents were under the age of 18 and 22.6% were 65 years of age or older. For every 100 females, there were 93.7 males, and for every 100 females age 18 and over there were 90.9 males age 18 and over.

100.0% of residents lived in urban areas, while 0.0% lived in rural areas.

Of the town's 3,090 households, 21.6% had children under the age of 18 living in them. 48.2% were married-couple households, 17.9% were households with a male householder and no spouse or partner present, and 26.3% were households with a female householder and no spouse or partner present. 31.6% of all households were made up of individuals, and 12.7% had someone living alone who was 65 years of age or older.

There were 5,618 housing units, of which 45.0% were vacant. The homeowner vacancy rate was 2.5% and the rental vacancy rate was 43.4%.

Carolina Beach racial composition
Race	Number	Percentage
White (non-Hispanic)	5,982	91.13%
Black or African American (non-Hispanic)	53	0.81%
Native American	17	0.26%
Asian	50	0.76%
Pacific Islander	1	0.02%
Other/Mixed	277	4.22%
Hispanic or Latino	184	2.8%

=== 2013 census estimate ===
At the 2013 census estimate, the population density was 2,086.4 people per square mile (805.6 people/km^{2}).

The median income for a household in the town was $37,662, and the median income for a family was $44,882. Males had a median income of $31,013 versus $21,241 for females. The per capita income for the town was $24,128. About 8.4% of families and 14.4% of the population were below the poverty line, including 10.9% of those under age 18 and none of those age 65 or over.

== Education ==
The New Hanover County Schools district covers Carolina Beach. Only Carolina Beach Elementary School, founded in 1937, is located in the town. Older students are assigned to Charles P. Murray Middle School and Eugene Ashley High School in Wilmington.

== History ==
The town was "wiped off the map" by Hurricane Hazel in 1954. Reportedly, 362 buildings were destroyed in the town.

== Points of interest ==
- Carolina Beach Pier
- LORAN-C transmitter Carolina Beach
- Fort Fisher
- North Carolina Aquarium at Fort Fisher
- Carolina Beach State Park
- Joy Lee Apartment Building and Annex, and Newton Homesite and Cemetery are listed on the National Register of Historic Places.
- Freeman Park - Located on the North end of Carolina Beach where beachgoers can drive onto the beach with a 4WD vehicle and camp overnight.
- Pleasure Island Sea Turtle Project
- Island Greenway
- Federal Point Historic Preservation Society
- Britt's Donuts
- Carolina Beach Mooring Field

== Pictures ==
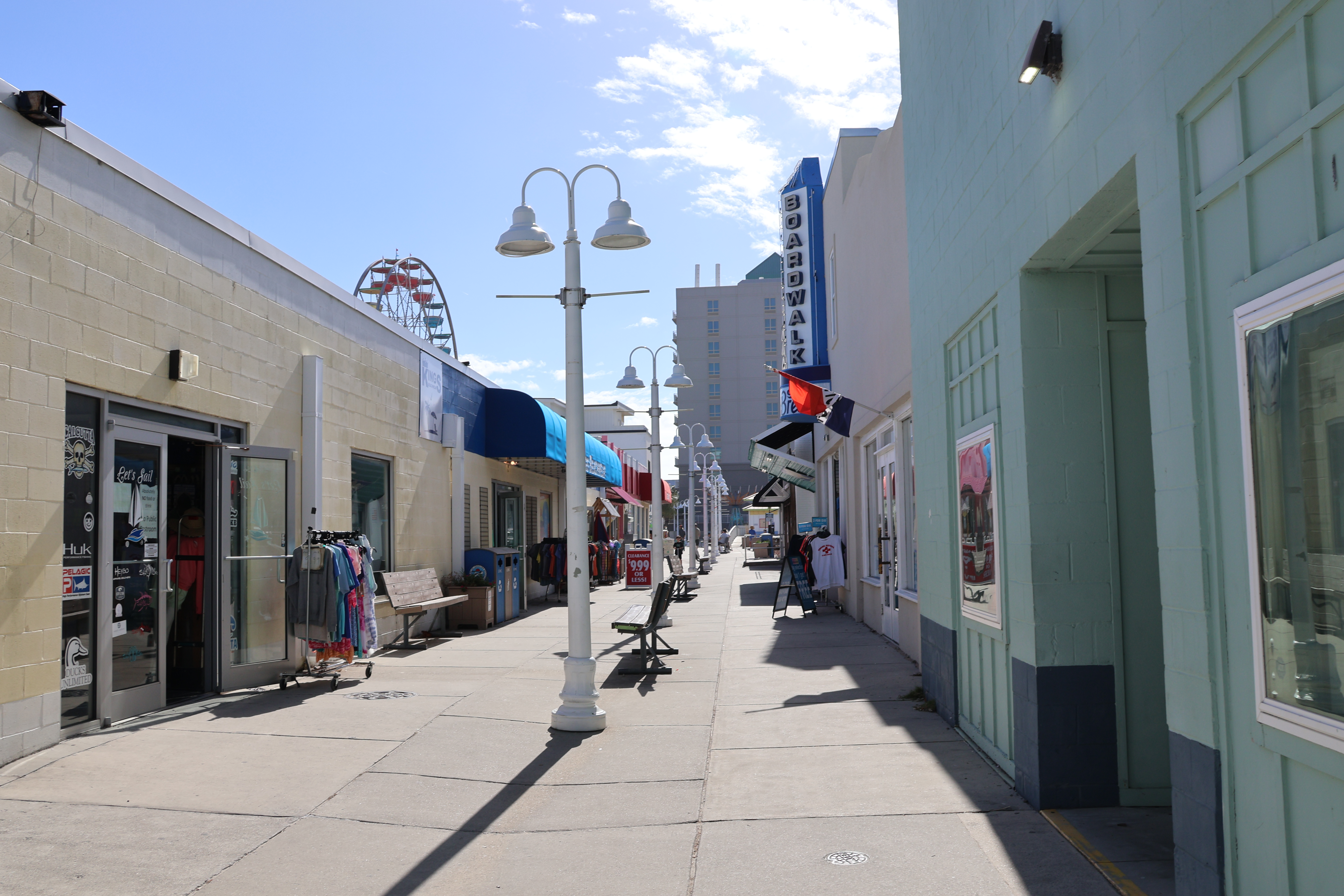
Business front on the Carolina Beach Boardwalk during the off season

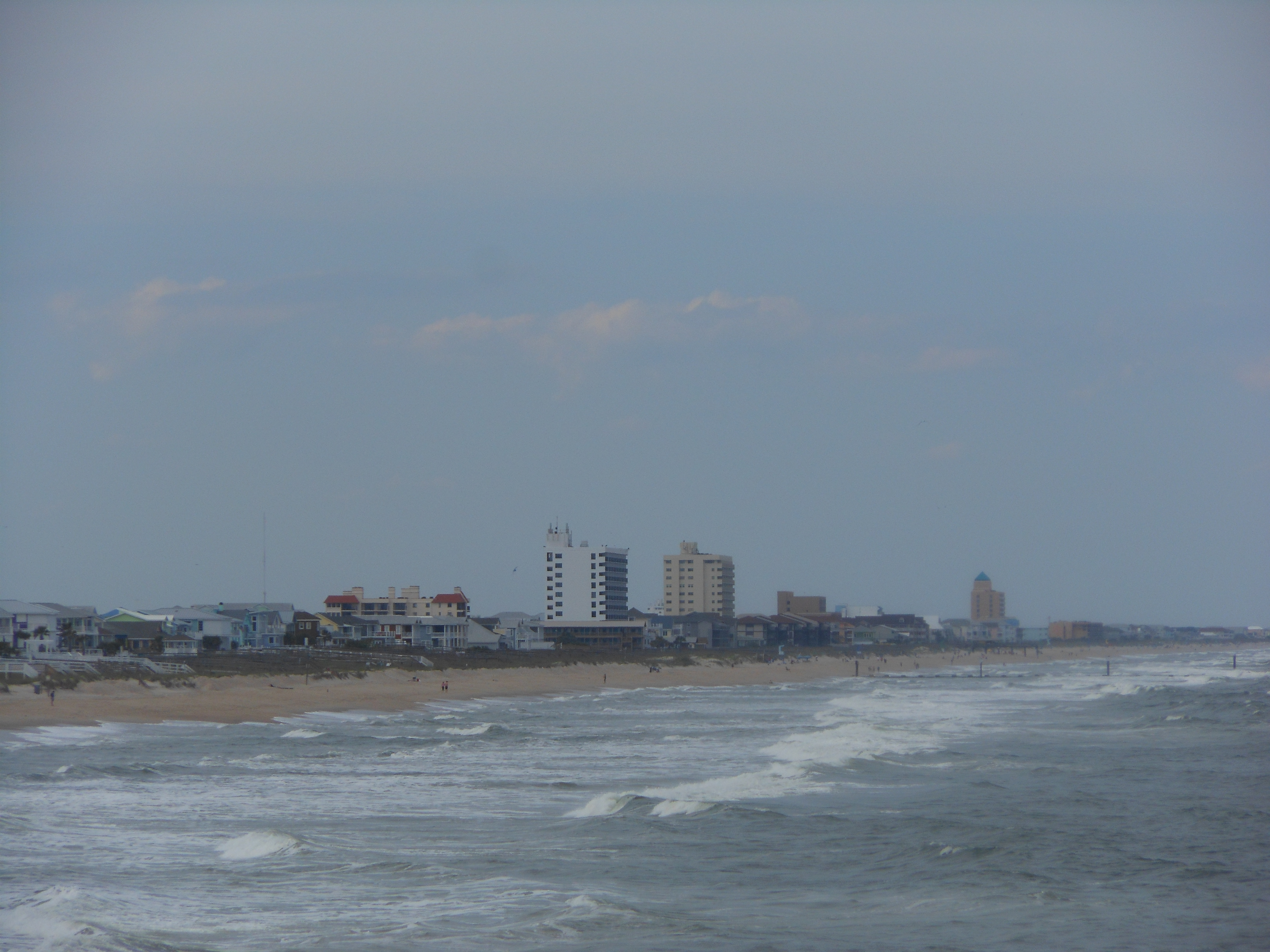
Carolina Beach waterfront homes and hotels

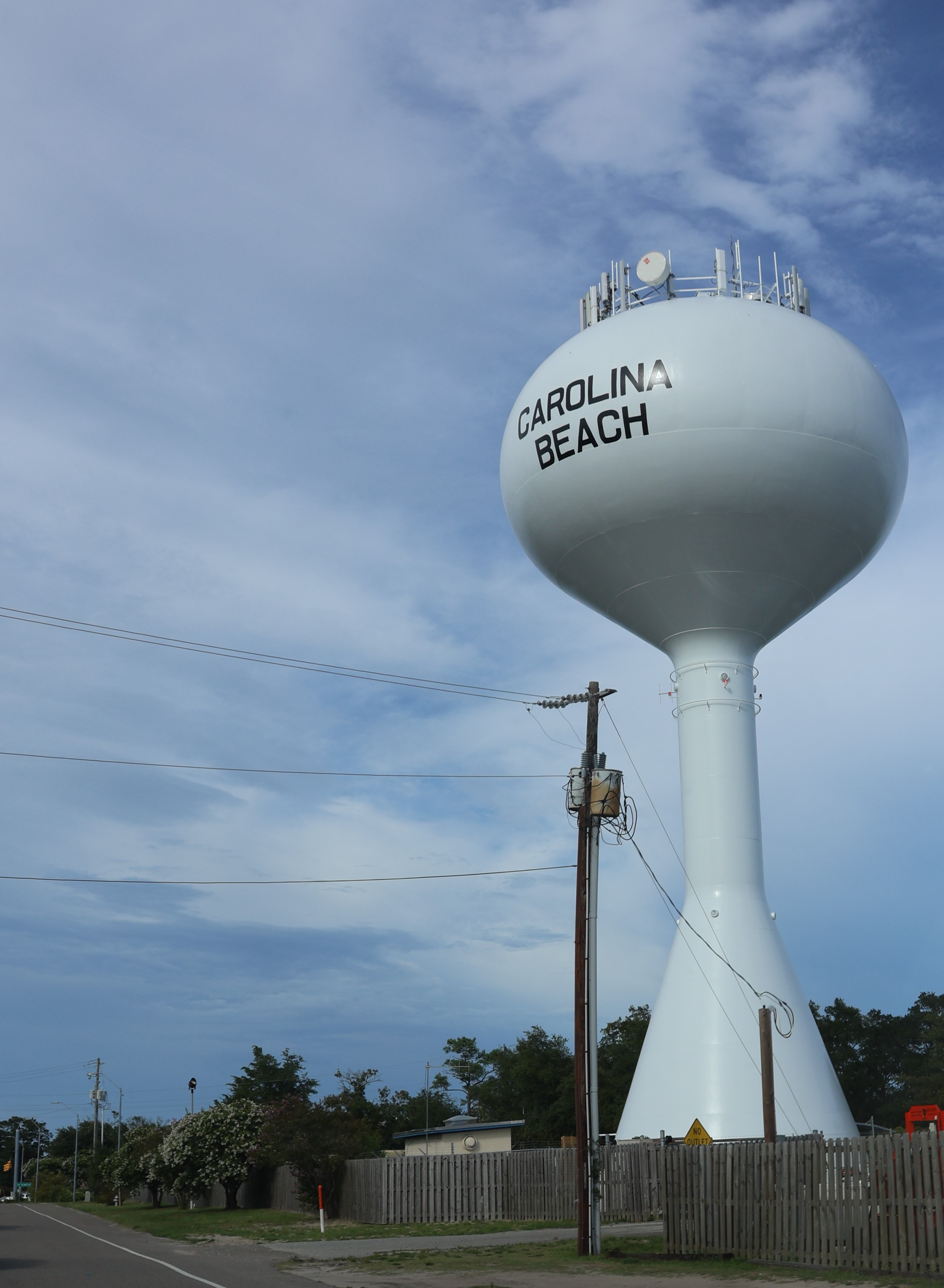
Water tower on Dow Road

Preceded by Masonboro Island	Beaches of Southeastern North Carolina	Succeeded by Kure Beach
