= Carolina Place Historic District =

Historic district in North Carolina, United States

- U.S. National Register of Historic Places
- U.S. Historic district
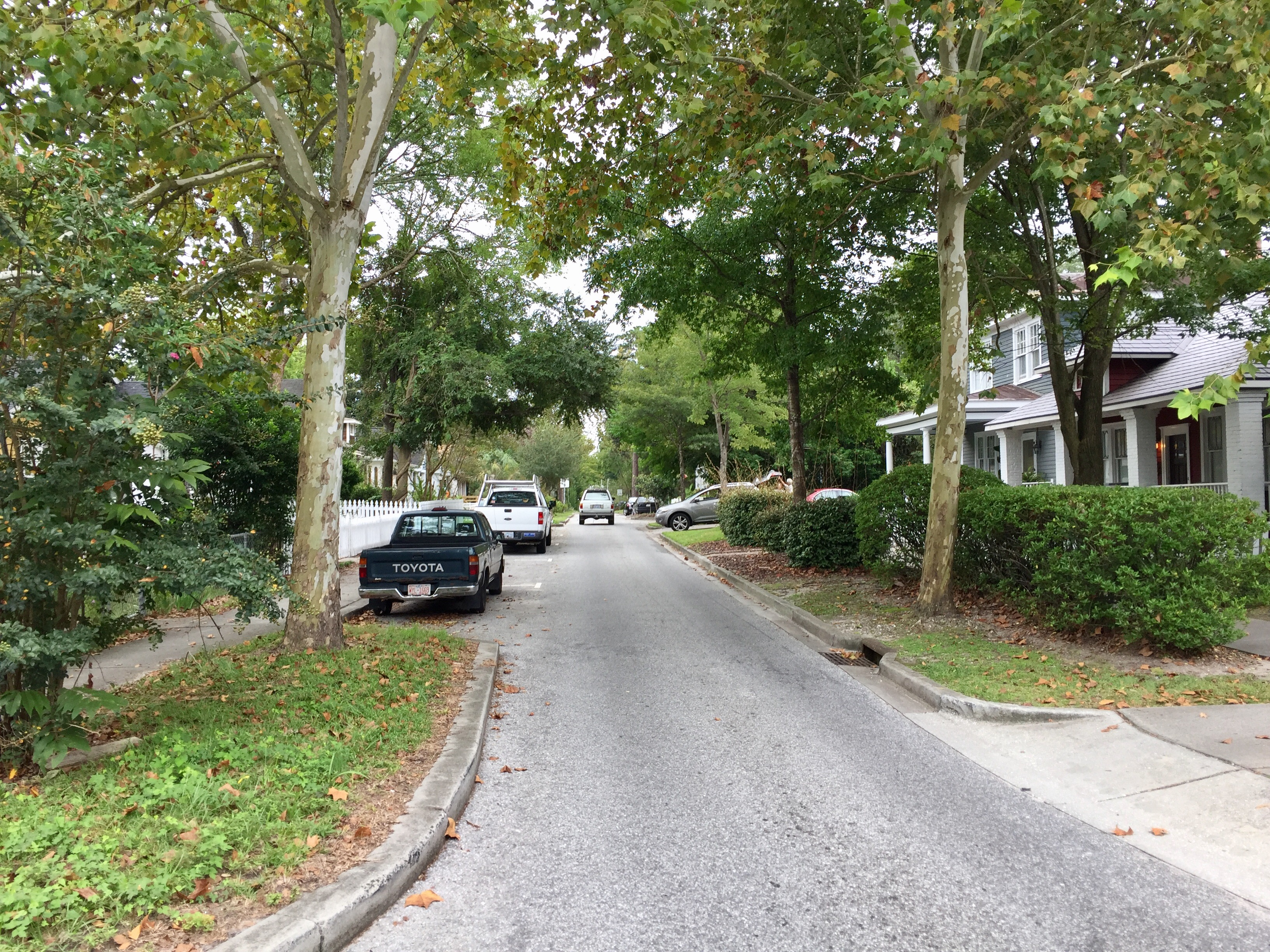

- Location within North Carolina Location within the United States
- Location: Bounded by Market St., Wallace Park, Gibson Ave., Wrightsville Ave. and S. Eighteenth St., Wilmington, North Carolina
- Coordinates: 34°14′06″N 77°55′24″W
- Area: 46 acres (19 ha)
- Built: 1906
- Architect: Stephens, Burett
- Architectural style: Late 19th And 20th Century Revivals, Bungalow/craftsman, Queen Anne
- NRHP reference No.: 92001086
- Added to NRHP: August 31, 1992

Carolina Place Historic District is a national historic district located at Wilmington, New Hanover County, North Carolina. The district encompasses 337 contributing buildings in a predominantly residential section of Wilmington. The district developed as Wilmington's first planned streetcar suburb between about 1906 and 1941 and includes notable examples of Queen Anne, Classical Revival, Colonial Revival, and Bungalow / American Craftsman style architecture.

It was listed on the National Register of Historic Places in 1992.
