= Discovery World =

Discovery World may refer to:

- Discovery World (museum), a science and technology museum in Milwaukee, Wisconsin, US
- Discovery World (international TV channel), in Europe
- Discovery World (Canadian TV channel), later CTV Speed Channel
- Discovery World, later known as Lihpao Land, a theme park in Taiwan
