= James D. and Frances Sprunt Cottage =

Historic house in North Carolina, United States

- U.S. National Register of Historic Places
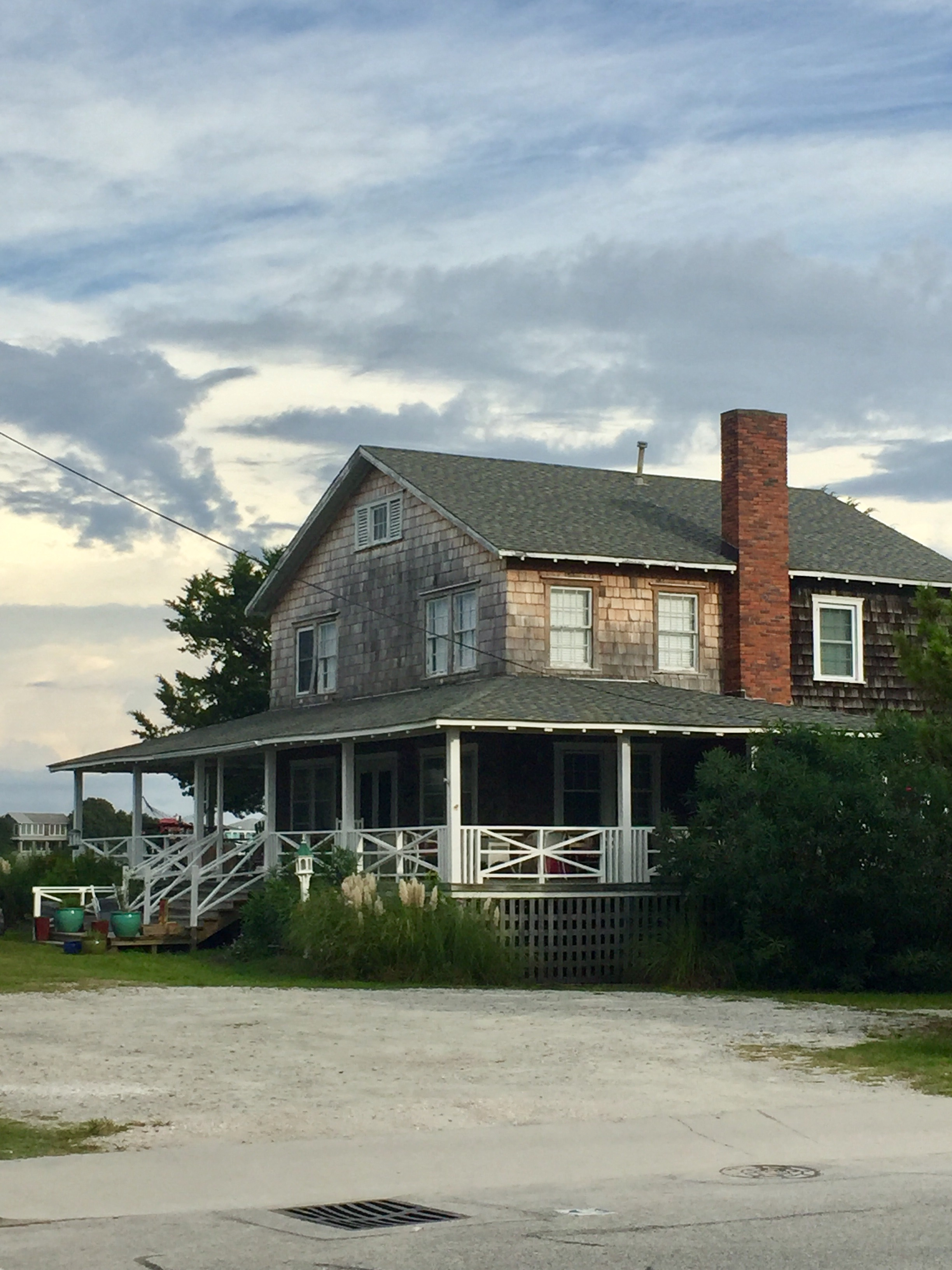

- Location within North Carolina Location within the United States
- Location: 207 N. Lumina Ave. Wrightsville Beach, North Carolina
- Coordinates: 34°12′39″N 77°47′40″W
- Area: 0.186 acres (0.075 ha)
- Built: 1937
- NRHP reference No.: 13000935
- Added to NRHP: December 18, 2013

James D. and Frances Sprunt Cottage is a historic beach cottage located at Wrightsville Beach, New Hanover County, North Carolina. It was built in 1937, and is an elevated two-story, three-bay frame cottage. It features a gable-front roof with exposed rafter tails, a main-level porch with an upper deck, and a double-tier wraparound porch. The ground level includes a two-car garage.

It was listed on the National Register of Historic Places in 2013.
