= Audubon Trolley Station =

- U.S. National Register of Historic Places
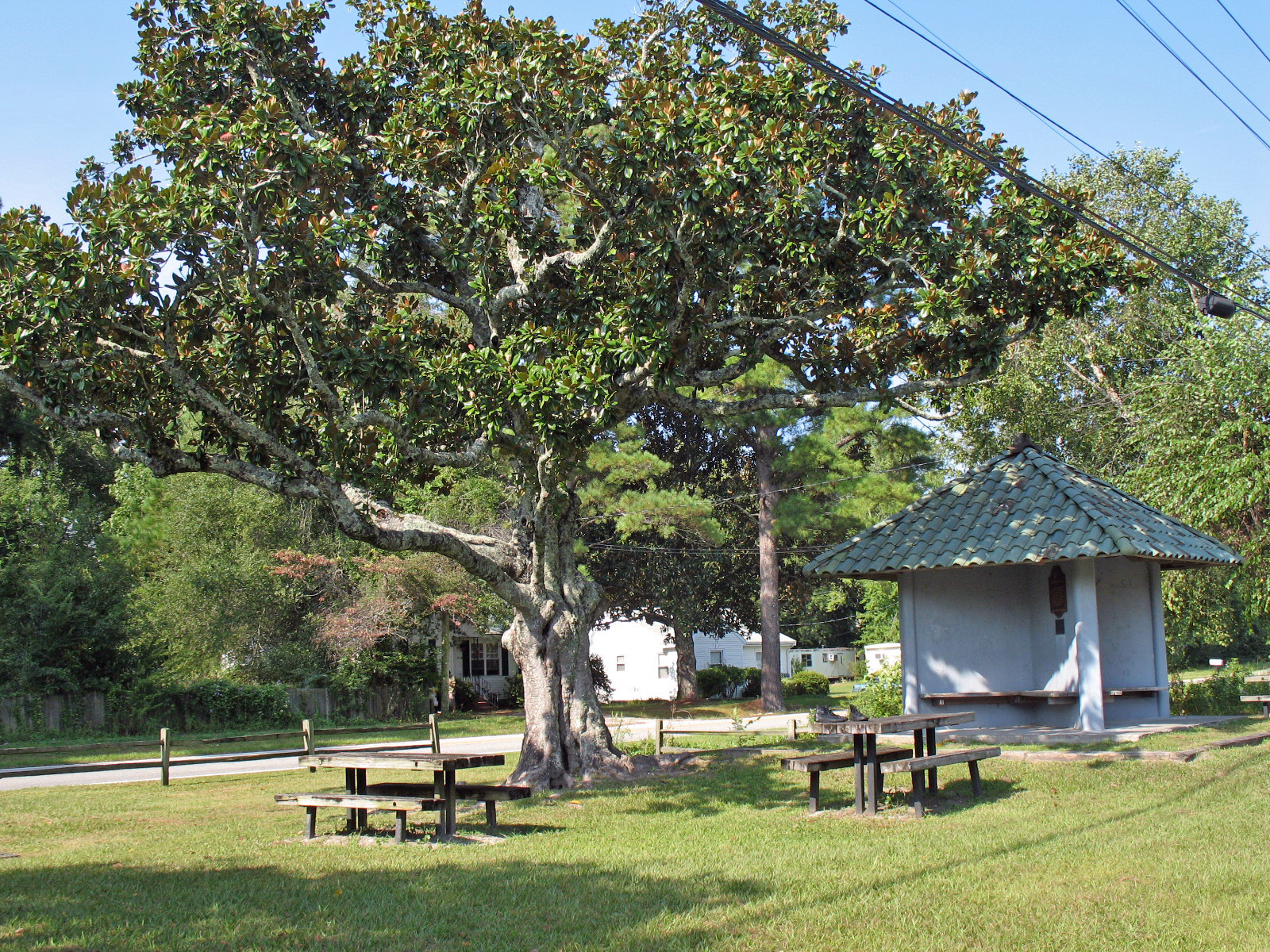
- Audubon Trolley Station, September 2009

- Location within North Carolina Location within the United States
- Location: Jct. of Park Ave. and Audubon Blvd., Wilmington, North Carolina
- Coordinates: 34°12′55″N 77°53′47″W
- Area: less than one acre
- Built: 1911
- Built by: Tidewater Power Co.
- Architectural style: Mission/spanish Revival
- NRHP reference No.: 93000736
- Added to NRHP: August 5, 1993

Audubon Trolley Station is a historic trolley station located at Wilmington, New Hanover County, North Carolina. It was built in 1911, and is a small reinforced concrete shelter in the Mission Revival style. It consists of four reinforced concrete walls radiating out from a central point to form a Greek cross in plan. The replacement roof is covered by rounded terra cotta tile glazed with a green color. The trolley line to Wrightsville Beach ceased operating in 1940.

It was listed on the National Register of Historic Places in 1993.
