= Delgrado School =

Historic school building in North Carolina, United States

- U.S. National Register of Historic Places
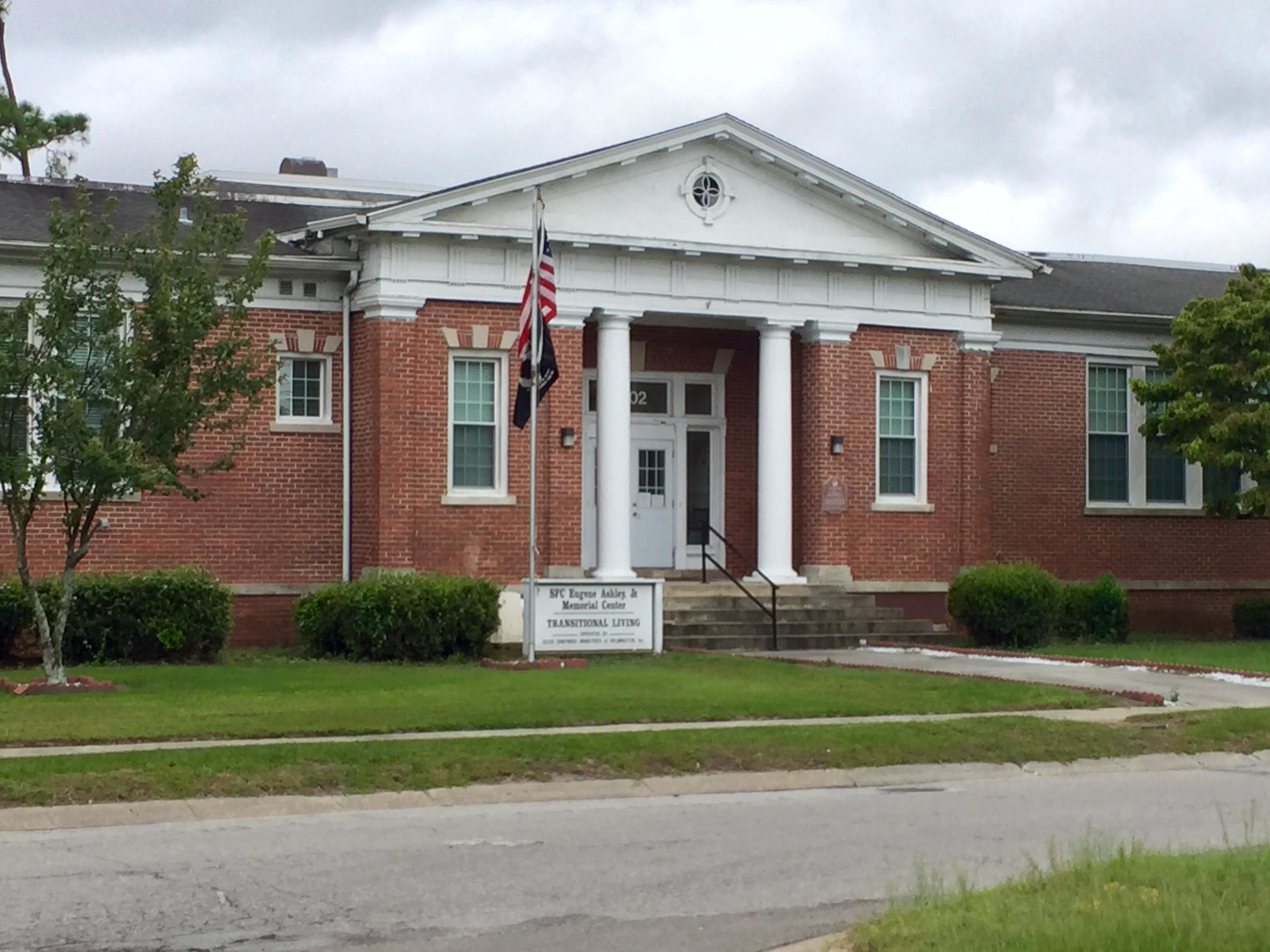

- Location within North Carolina Location within the United States
- Location: 1930 Colwell Ave. Wilmington, North Carolina
- Coordinates: 34°13′45″N 77°55′21″W
- Area: 1.3 acres (0.53 ha)
- Built: 1914
- Architect: Gause, James F., Jr.; et.al.
- Architectural style: Classical Revival
- NRHP reference No.: 01001135
- Added to NRHP: October 20, 2001

Delgrado School, also known as Washington Catlett School, is a historic school building located at Wilmington, New Hanover County, North Carolina. It was built 1914, and is a one-story, Classical Revival style red brick building with a low-pitched gable and hip roof. Additions were made to the original building in 1924 (auditorium and central classrooms), 1938 (east and west wings) and 1953 (kitchen). It was built as part of the Delgado Mill Village. The 1938 addition was built as a Public Works Administration project.

It was listed on the National Register of Historic Places in 2001.
