= USS Peterhoff =

Gunboat of the United States Navy

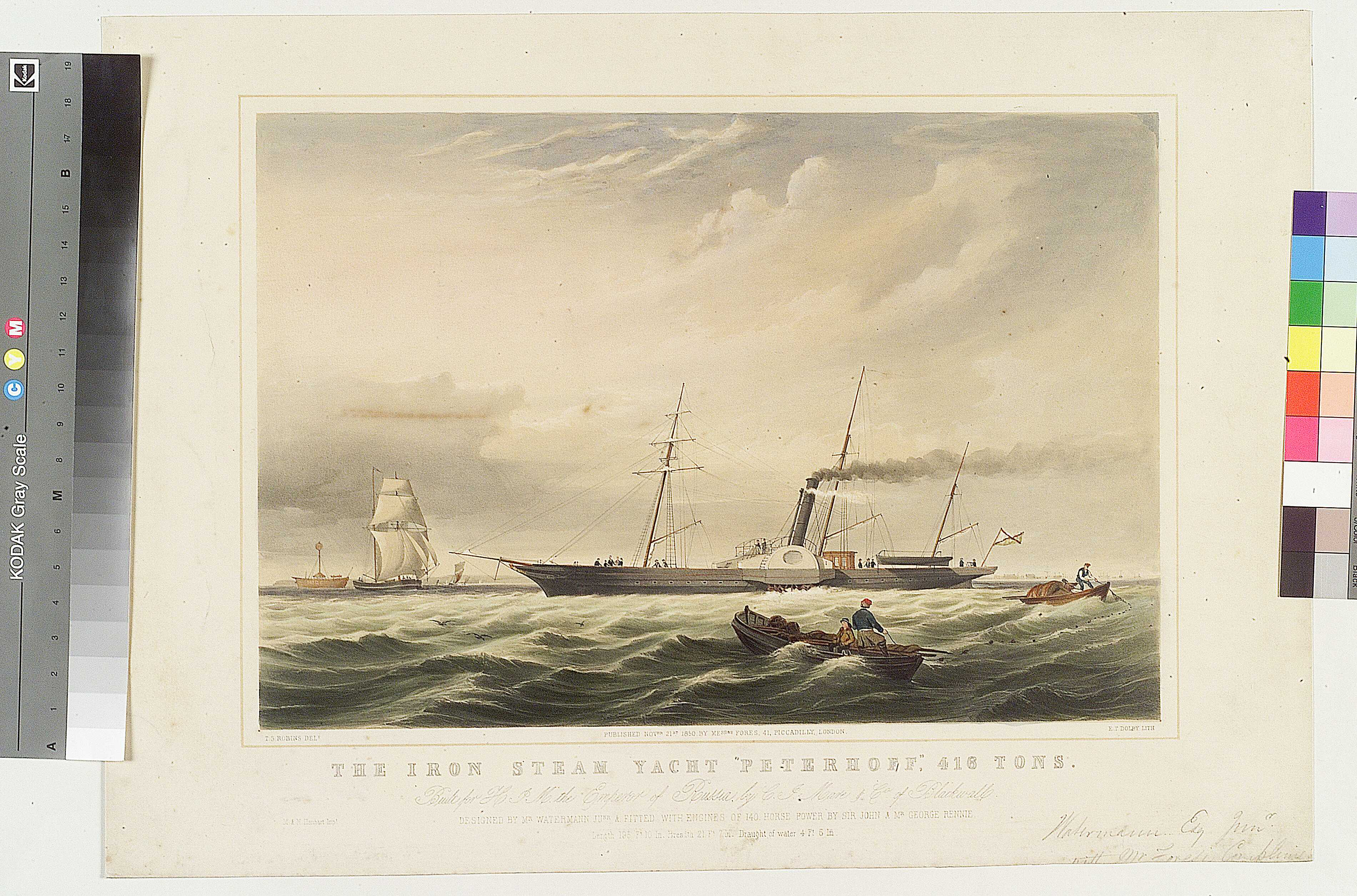
- The Russian yacht Peterhoff, later the Peterhoff blockade runner, and USS Peterhoff.

History

Russia
- Name: Peterhoff
- Namesake: Peterhof Palace
- Owner: Imperial Russian Government
- Operator: Imperial Russian Navy
- Builder: C.J. Mare & Co., Blackwall, London
- Launched: 1850
- Fate: Sold to United Kingdom

History

United Kingdom
- Name: Peterhoff
- Fate: Sold to United States

History

United States
- Name: USS Peterhoff
- Acquired: by Union Navy forces, 25 February 1863
- Commissioned: February 1864
- Stricken: 1864 (est.)
- Fate: Rammed and sunk, 6 March 1864

General characteristics
- Tons burthen: 412 tons
- Length: 210 ft (64 m)
- Beam: 28 ft (8.5 m)
- Depth of hold: 15 ft (4.6 m)
- Propulsion: 140 hp (100 kW) steam engine, screw-propelled
- USS Peterhoff
- U.S. National Register of Historic Places
- Nearest city: Fort Fisher, North Carolina
- Area: 2 acres (0.81 ha)
- Built: 1863
- NRHP reference No.: 75001283
- Added to NRHP: 6 August 1975

USS Peterhoff was a British ship captured by the Union Navy during the American Civil War. Condemned as a blockade runner, she served the Union Navy's struggle against the Confederate States of America as a gunboat.

== Ship history ==
=== Construction ===
The Peterhoff was a 416-ton iron-hulled yacht originally built for the Tsar of Russia by C. J. Mare & Co. of Blackwall, London, with 140 hp steam engines by J & G. Rennie. Launched in 1850,

=== Early history ===
During her delivery voyage to Saint Petersburg, Peterhoff was driven ashore on Saaremaa on 1 November 1850. She was abandoned by the crew and her insurers made a payment of £15,000 to the Imperial Russian Government. She was later refloated and sank to preserve her from damage from the waves. Peterhoff was refloated in the spring of 1851 and taken in to Riga, where temporary repairs were made. Departing in early July, she reached London on 17 July. The ship was acquired by British interests and fitted out as a cargo ship.

=== Seizure ===
Peterhoff sailed from Falmouth, Cornwall on 27 January 1863. On 20 February 1863, she was boarded and searched by the USS Alabama off the island of Saint Thomas in the Danish West Indies. Alabama found her papers in order and released her. Peterhoff then entered the harbour at St. Thomas where two U.S. Navy ships commanded by Acting Rear Admiral Charles Wilkes were at anchor. Wilkes, already notorious for his part in the "Trent Affair", ordered that the Peterhoff be boarded by the USS Vanderbilt just after she had left harbour on 25 February.

Peterhoff had papers that stated that she was bound for Matamoros in Mexico, but then a sailor aboard let slip that she was really bound for Brownsville, Texas, just across the Rio Grande. This comment was taken as sufficient justification for Vanderbilt to seize the ship as a blockade runner, and she was sent to Key West. Both the Danish and British governments vigorously protested the seizure, but the ship was eventually condemned by the New York prize court and bought by the Union Navy. She was commissioned in February 1864 with Acting-Volunteer Lieutenant Thomas Pickering in command, and assigned to the North Atlantic Blockading Squadron.

=== Sinking ===
The ship departed Hampton Roads, Virginia, on 28 February to blockade Wilmington, North Carolina. However, early on the morning of 6 March 1864, the Peterhoff was rammed by the gunboat Monticello, which mistook her for a blockade runner. Although Peterhoff sank within half an hour, all of her crew were saved. On the night of 7 March 1864, men from Mount Vernon and Niphon boarded the wreck at low tide and destroyed as much as they could, cutting down the masts and spiking all the guns that they could reach.

== Post-war ==
After the Civil War, the Supreme Court overturned the prize court's decision, and the owners of the Peterhoff received compensation for their loss.

The wreck of Peterhoff was rediscovered by divers in 1963 in 30 ft (9.1 m) of water off Kure Beach, North Carolina. Three 32-pounder smoothbore cannon were later salvaged. In 1974, a 30-pounder Parrott rifle was raised, and is now on display at the University of North Carolina Wilmington. Other guns from the ship are on display at Fort Fisher State Historic Site and the Carteret County Museum of History at Morehead City, North Carolina. The wreck site was placed on the National Register of Historic Places in 1975.

== See also ==
- Blockade runners of the American Civil War
- Blockade mail of the Confederacy
