= North Carolina Highway 132 =

State highway in New Hanover County, North Carolina, US

North Carolina Highway 132
- College Road

Route information
- Maintained by NCDOT
- Length: 15.1 mi (24.3 km)
- Existed: 1958–present

Major junctions
- South end: US 421 in Myrtle Grove
- US 117 in Wilmington; US 76 in Wilmington; US 74 in Wilmington; I-40 in Kings Grant
- North end: US 117 / NC 133 in Castle Hayne

Location
- Country: United States
- State: North Carolina
- Counties: New Hanover

Highway system
- North Carolina Highway System; Interstate; US; State; Scenic
← NC 131	→ NC 133

North Carolina Highway 132 (NC 132) is a north-south North Carolina State Highway entirely in New Hanover County. The highway follows College Road for the duration of its route. The southern terminus of NC 132 begins at U.S. Route 421 (US 421) in the census-designated place of Myrtle Grove south of Wilmington. Continuing north, NC 132 continues along a major north-south artillery road in the city of Wilmington. Between Shipyard Boulevard and its northern terminus, NC 132 runs concurrently with US 117. NC 132 shares a short concurrency at the eastern terminus of Interstate 40 (I-40), before continuing north toward Castle Hayne. The northern terminus of NC 132 is located at a roundabout with US 117 and NC 133 just south of the main business district of Castle Hayne.

NC 132 was established in 1958 running along its present-day routing from US 421 to US 117 in Castle Hayne. In 1983 the highway was briefly shifted along the present-day routing of I-40 from Wilmington to US 117 south of Wallace. However, in 1984, NC 132 was reverted to its pre-1983 designation, with the freeway being renumbered as I-40.

== Route description ==
NC 132 begins at U.S. Route 421 (US 421) on the border of Myrtle Grove and Silver Lake. Continuing north of the intersection, NC 132 follows College Road, a four-lane divided highway. The region is mostly residential, with several shopping centers alongside the road. NC 132 passes Cape Fear Academy to the east, and intersects 17th Street southeast of downtown Wilmington. The Central College Trail, a multi-use trail paralleling NC 132 begins at 17th Street and continues north until Holly Tree Road. College Road passes Pine Valley Country Club to the east, before intersecting US 117 at Shipyard Boulevard/Long Leaf Hills Drive. US 117 runs concurrently with NC 132 from Shipyard Boulevard until its northern terminus. North of the intersection, College Road becomes an undivided six-lane road, with two northbound lanes, three southbound lanes, and a middle turning lane. NC 132 serves as an access point to Long Leaf Park to its east.

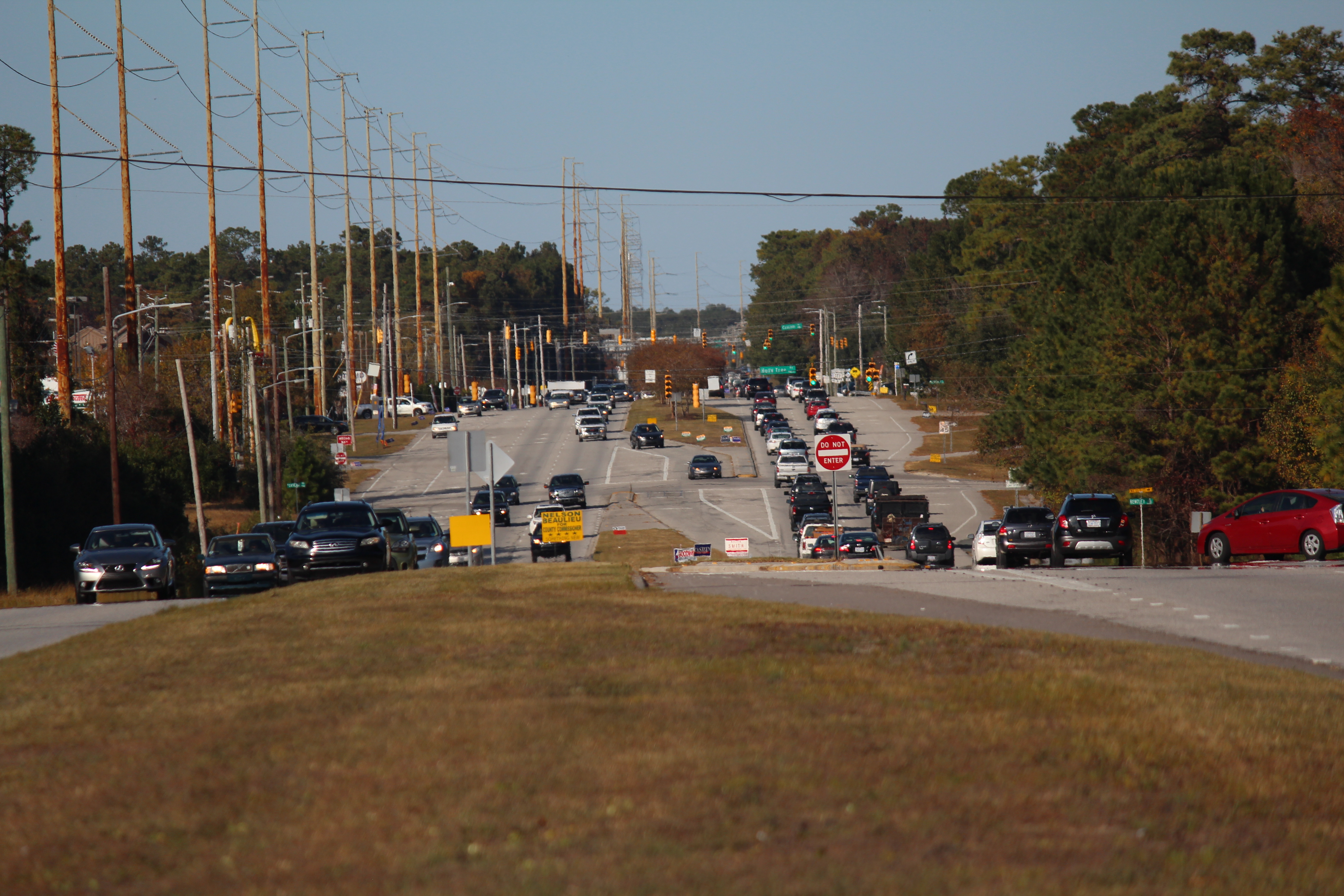
NC 132 approaching Shipyard Boulevard in Wilmington

At Oleader Drive, NC 132 intersects US 17/US 76. The intersection is one of the busiest in Wilmington, with approximately 70,500 vehicles using the intersection daily in 2019. North of Wrightsville Avenue, NC 132 begins a slight turn to the northeast ending southwest of MacMillan Avenue. The road widens to a six-lane divided highway with a grass median at Wilshire Boulevard. NC 132 runs along the western edge of the University of North Carolina Wilmington, providing access to the university via Hurst Drive, Crews Drive, and Randall Drive. North of the university, NC 132 continues through a commercial area and slightly turns to the northwest after intersecting Oriole Drive. NC 132 meets with US 17 Business (Market Street) at a partial cloverleaf interchange. At the interchange, the speed limit rises from 45 miles per hour (72 km/h) to 55 miles per hour (89 km/h). NC 132 intersects US 74 (Martin Luther King Jr. Parkway) along the city limits of Wilmington. In Kings Grant, NC 132 crosses Smith Creek, a tributary of the Cape Fear River, and meets Interstate 40 (I-40) at its eastern terminus. NC 132 and US 117 run concurrently with I-40 for approximately one-half mile (0.80 km), before exiting the freeway and continuing to the northwest along College Road.

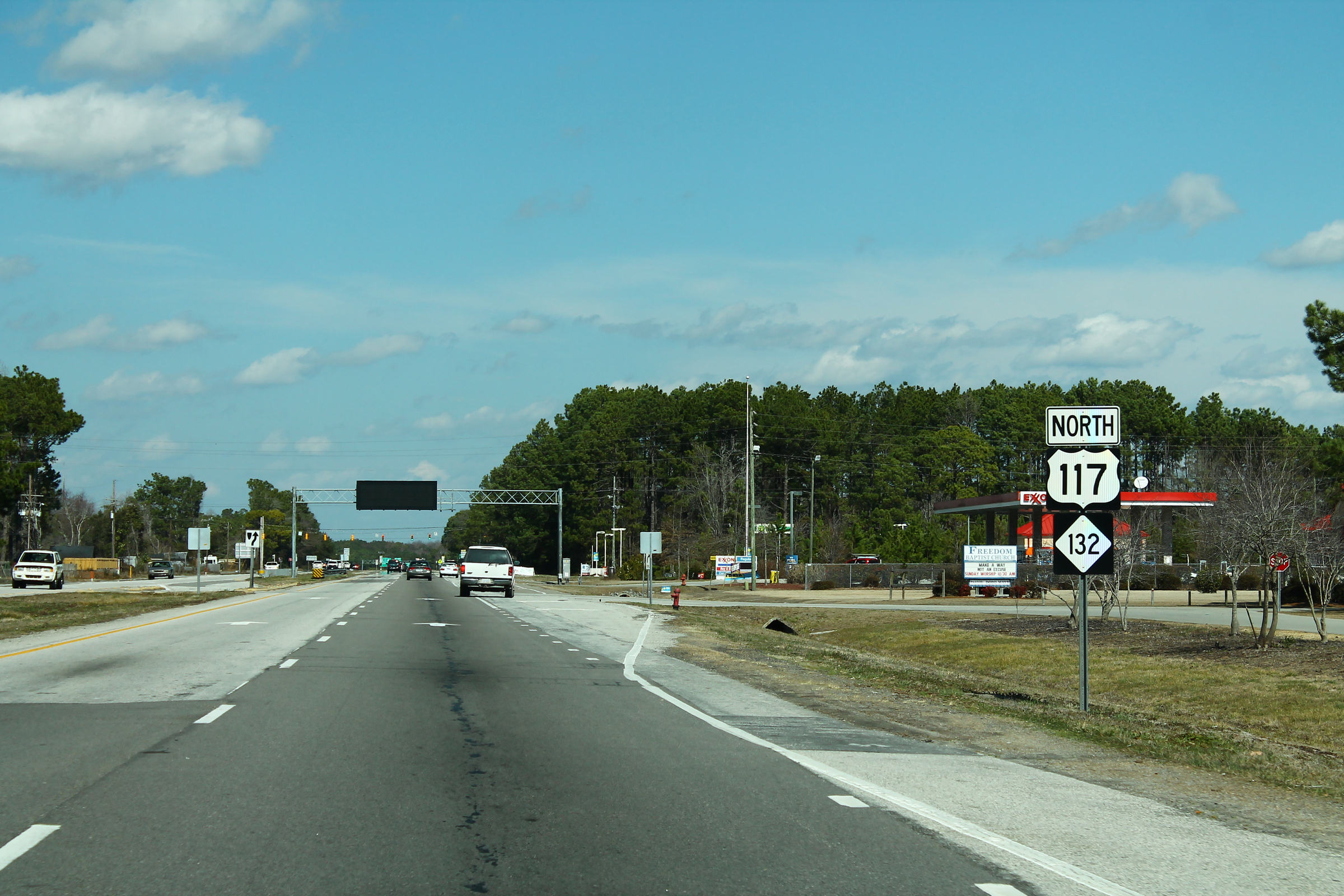
NC 132 and US 117 running concurrently in Kings Grant

NC 132 largely parallels I-40 between the I-40 interchange and its northern terminus. NC 132 runs through an unincorporated and largely residential area north of the interchange. The highway provides access to Emsley A. Laney High School along with Olsen Park. At Murrayville Road, the highway transforms from a four-lane divided highway to a four-lane undivided road, before becoming a two-lane undivided road north of Long Ridge Drive. Passing over I-140, NC 132 passes to the west of Cape Fear Community College North Campus, accessible from Sidbury Road. The road is considerably more rural north of I-140, with large wooded areas adjacent to the roadway. NC 132 begins a turn to the northwest toward Castle Hayne to the north of an intersection with Blue Clay Road. The highway crosses a railroad track, before ending at a roundabout with US 117 and NC 133 just south of Castle Hayne.

== History ==
NC 132 was established in 1958 running along College Road from US 421 south of Wilmington to US 117 in Castle Hayne. College Road was a newly built two-lane road, bypassing downtown Wilmington to the east. Between 1961 and 1963, College Road was widened to a multi-lane road between Shipyard Boulevard and Wilshire Boulevard. NC 132 was further widened from Wilshire Boulevard north to Gordon Road in 1979. The construction of future I-40 in Wilmington built a new interchange at Gordon Road, requiring NC 132 travelers to use the exit ramps from the freeway. NC 132 was briefly rerouted to run along the new freeway from Wilmington to US 117 south of Wallace. This left the northern section of NC 132 from the freeway to US 117/NC 133 in Castle Hayne as a secondary roadway. In August 1984, NC 132 was removed from the freeway routing, and reinstated on its previous routing along College Road to Castle Hayne. The freeway became part of I-40, creating the short concurrency at the eastern end of the Interstate. In 1993, the section of NC 132 from US 421 to Shipyard Boulevard was multilaned, becoming the last section south of I-40 to be multilaned.

On March 17, 2003, US 117 was rerouted, being removed from its routing through downtown Wilmington. Instead it was routed along College Road and Shipyard Boulevard to the State Port. This created a 10.9 miles (17.5 km) concurrency between NC 132 and US 117 from Shipyard Boulevard to Castle Hayne. In August 2015, a roundabout replaced an at-grade Y-intersection with NC 133 at the northern terminus of NC 132. The roundabout adjusted the roadway slightly to the west, with the former alignment becoming a service road.

== Future ==
The Wilmington Metropolitan Planning Organization has identified four projects to be completed along NC 132. Project U-5792 would involve extending the limited-access divided freeway from I-40 to Oriole Drive in Wilmington. Three new interchanges, at Kings Drive, US 74 (Martin Luther King Jr. Parkway), and Ringo Drive would be constructed. Additionally, the US 17 Business (Market Street) interchange would be reconstructed, with the southbound on and off-ramps being adjusted to intersect Van Campen Boulevard. Additionally, a section of the roadway would be widened to four-lanes in each direction. The project is expected to begin construction in 2026.

Project U-5704 would improve NC 132 between Shipyard Boulevard and Wilshire Boulevard by constructing a new intersection or interchange at US 76 (Oleander Drive). Access management and travel time improvements would be completed throughout the length of the project. The project is expected to begin construction in 2030.

Projects U-5702A and U-5702B would construct access management and other travel time-saving improvements along NC 132 in Wilmington. Project U-5702A would construct improvements between Shipyard Boulevard (US 117) and New Centre Drive. It is expected that project U-5702A will begin construction in 2026. Project U-5702B would construct similar improvements between the southern terminus of NC 132 at US 421 (Carolina Beach Road) and Shipyard Boulevard. Right of way acquisition for project U-5702B is expected to begin in 2025.

== Major intersections ==
The entire route is in New Hanover County.

Location	mi	km	Destinations	Notes
Monkey Junction	0.0	0.0	US 421 (Carolina Beach Road) / Piner Road – Clinton, Carolina Beach	
Wilmington	4.2	6.8	US 117 south (Shipyard Boulevard) / Long Leaf Hills Drive – State Port	South end of US 117 overlap
Wilmington	4.9	7.9	US 17 / US 76 (Oleander Drive) – Wilmington, Whiteville, Wrightsville Beach	
Wilmington	7.2– 7.5	11.6– 12.1	US 17 Bus. (Market Street) – Ogden, Wilmington	Interchange
Wilmington	8.2	13.2	US 74 (Martin Luther King Jr. Parkway) – Wilmington, Whiteville, Wrightsville Beach	
Kings Grant	9.3	15.0	I-40 begins	Eastern terminus of I-40; south end of I-40 overlap
Murraysville	9.4– 9.8	15.1– 15.8	Gordon Road	Northbound interchange, exit 420A (I-40)
Murraysville	9.5– 9.9	15.3– 15.9	I-40 west	Exit 420B (I-40)
Castle Hayne	15.1	24.3	US 117 / NC 133 north (Castle Hayne Road) – Castle Hayne	North end of US 117 overlap; roundabout
1.000 mi = 1.609 km; 1.000 km = 0.621 mi: Concurrency terminus
