= Castle Hayne, North Carolina =

- CDP
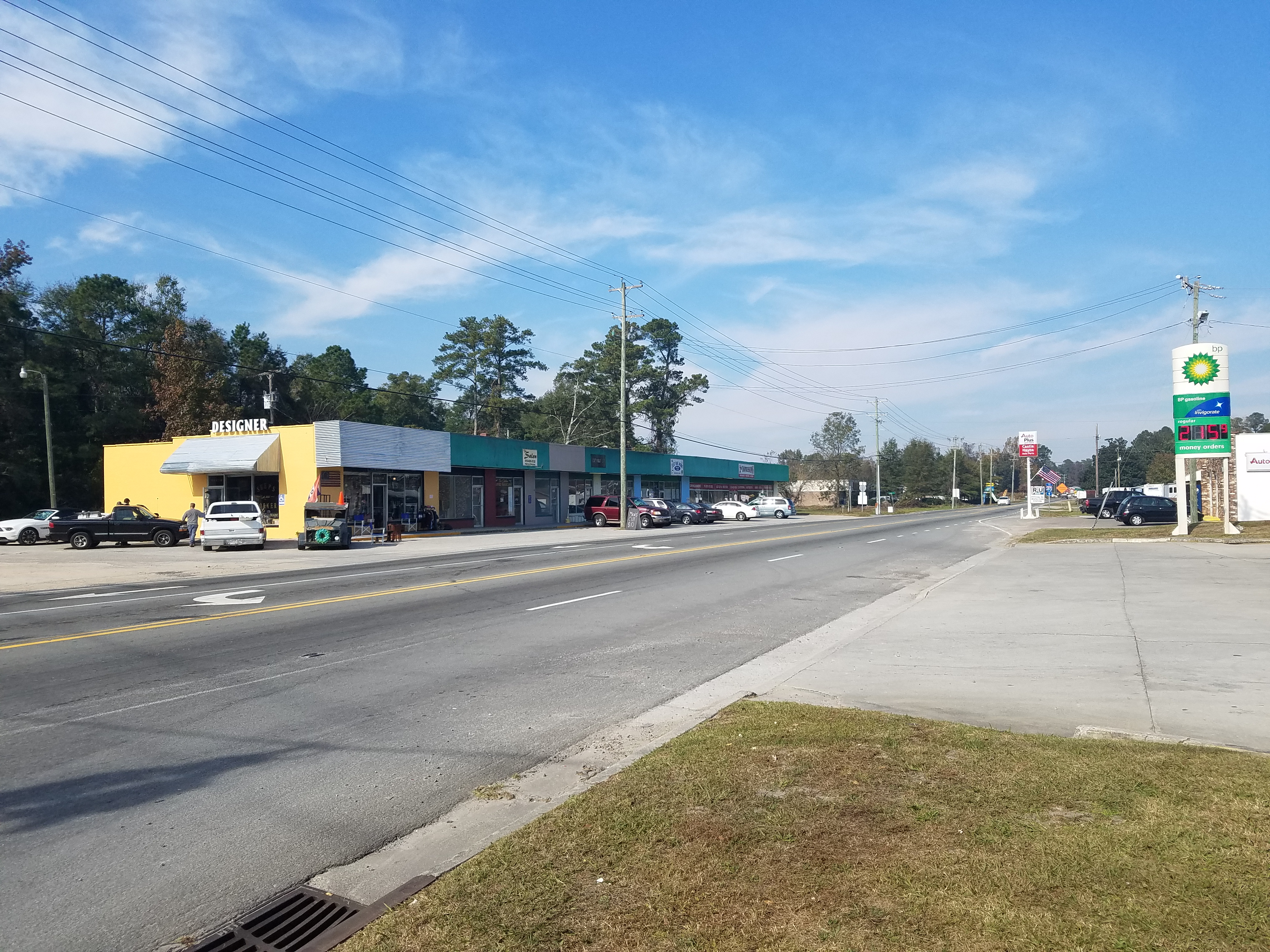

- Location in New Hanover County and the state of North Carolina.
- Coordinates: 34°21′30″N 77°54′41″W
- Country: United States
- State: North Carolina
- County: New Hanover

Area
  - Total: 5.15 sq mi (13.35 km^{2})
  - Land: 4.76 sq mi (12.34 km^{2})
  - Water: 0.39 sq mi (1.01 km^{2})
- Elevation: 10 ft (3.0 m)

Population (2020)
  - Total: 1,243
  - Density: 260.9/sq mi (100.73/km^{2})
- Time zone: UTC-5 (Eastern (EST))
  - Summer (DST): UTC-4 (EDT)
- ZIP code: 28429
- Area codes: 910, 472
- FIPS code: 37-10880
- GNIS feature ID: 2402752

Castle Hayne is a census-designated place (CDP) in New Hanover County, North Carolina, United States. The population was 1,234 at the 2020 census, up from 1,202 in 2010. Castle Hayne is located in the statistical township of Cape Fear. The CDP is part of the Wilmington Metropolitan Statistical Area. Castle Hayne was first listed as a CDP at the 1980 United States census.

== History ==
The forest provided the region's major industries through the 18th and most of the 19th century: naval stores and lumber fueled the economy both before and after the American Revolution. During the Revolutionary War, the British maintained a garrison at Fort Johnson near Wilmington. After suffering crippling losses at Guilford Court House, the British withdrew all forces back to Fort Johnson and abandoned plans to occupy North Carolina. This prompted the British to attack Yorktown, Virginia instead, which brought an end to the war.

The town took its name from the large house of Captain Roger Haynes.

Leading up to the 2011 election, there was a large movement among the residents to incorporate Castle Hayne to become the "Town of Castle Hayne". Nearby Wilmington had previously forced an annexation of Monkey Junction in 2010 and proposed a forced annexation of Ogden, both of which had resulted in numerous lawsuits and appeals.

The incorporation referendum failed in November 2011.

== Geography ==
According to the United States Census Bureau, the CDP has a total area of 2.3 square miles (6.0 km^{2}), of which 2.2 square miles (5.7 km^{2}) is land and 0.04 square miles (0.10 km^{2}) (1.32%) is water.

== Demographics ==
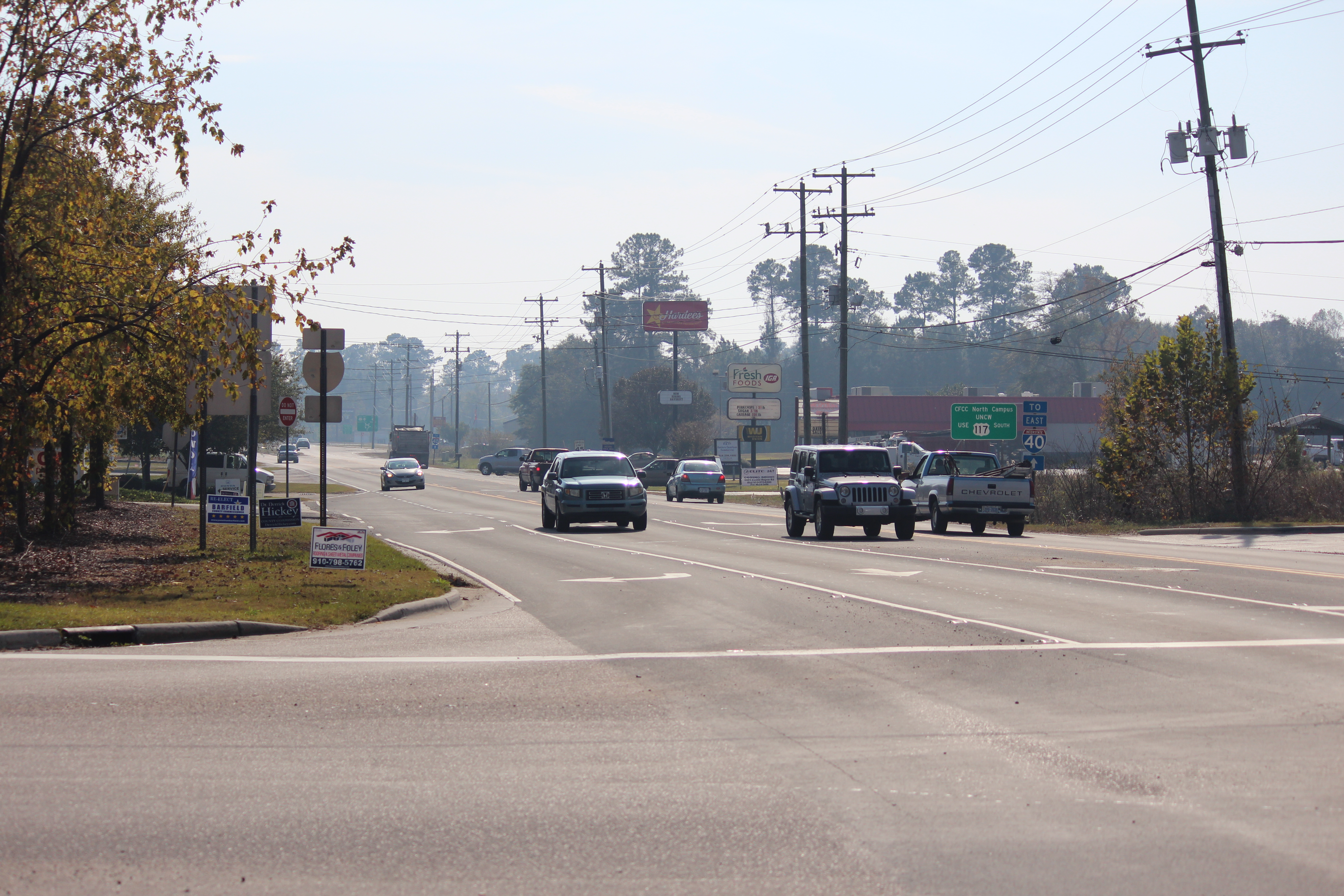
Central junction of Castle Hayne, North Carolina

Historical population
Census	Pop.	Note	%±
1980	1,087		—
1990	1,182		8.7%
2000	1,116		−5.6%
2010	1,202		7.7%
2020	1,243		3.4%
U.S. Decennial Census

=== 2020 census ===
Castle Hayne racial composition
Race	Number	Percentage
White (non-Hispanic)	950	76.43%
Black or African American (non-Hispanic)	129	10.38%
Native American	12	0.97%
Asian	4	0.32%
Pacific Islander	1	0.08%
Other/Mixed	52	4.18%
Hispanic or Latino	95	7.64%

As of the 2020 United States census, there were 1,243 people, 559 households, and 267 families residing in the CDP.

=== 2000 census ===
At the 2000 census, there were 1,116 people, 437 households and 312 families residing in the CDP. The population density was 495.9 inhabitants per square mile (191.5/km^{2}). There were 471 housing units at an average density of 209.3 per square mile (80.8/km^{2}). The racial makeup of the CDP was 81.54% White, 14.78% African American, 0.99% Native American, 0.27% Asian, 0.99% from other races, and 1.43% from two or more races. Hispanic or Latino of any race were 1.79% of the population. 17.4% were of Irish, 14.8% English, 7.3 United States or American, 5.7% Scots-Irish, 5.6% Subsaharan African, 5.1% German and 5.0% French ancestry according to Census 2000.

There were 437 households, of which 34.1% had children under the age of 18 living with them, 51.0% were married couples living together, 15.6% had a female householder with no husband present, and 28.6% were non-families. 22.0% of all households were made up of individuals, and 6.4% had someone living alone who was 65 years of age or older. The average household size was 2.55 and the average family size was 2.96.

25.9% of residents were under the age of 18, 8.8% from 18 to 24, 30.1% from 25 to 44, 24.7% from 45 to 64, and 10.5% who were 65 years of age or older. The median age was 36 years. For every 100 females, there were 96.8 males. For every 100 females age 18 and over, there were 93.2 males.

The median household income was $34,531, and the median family income was $42,417. Males had a median income of $38,375 versus $25,040 for females. The per capita income for the CDP was $17,172. About 4.6% of families and 6.2% of the population were below the poverty line, including 7.9% of those under age 18 and 3.8% of those age 65 or over.

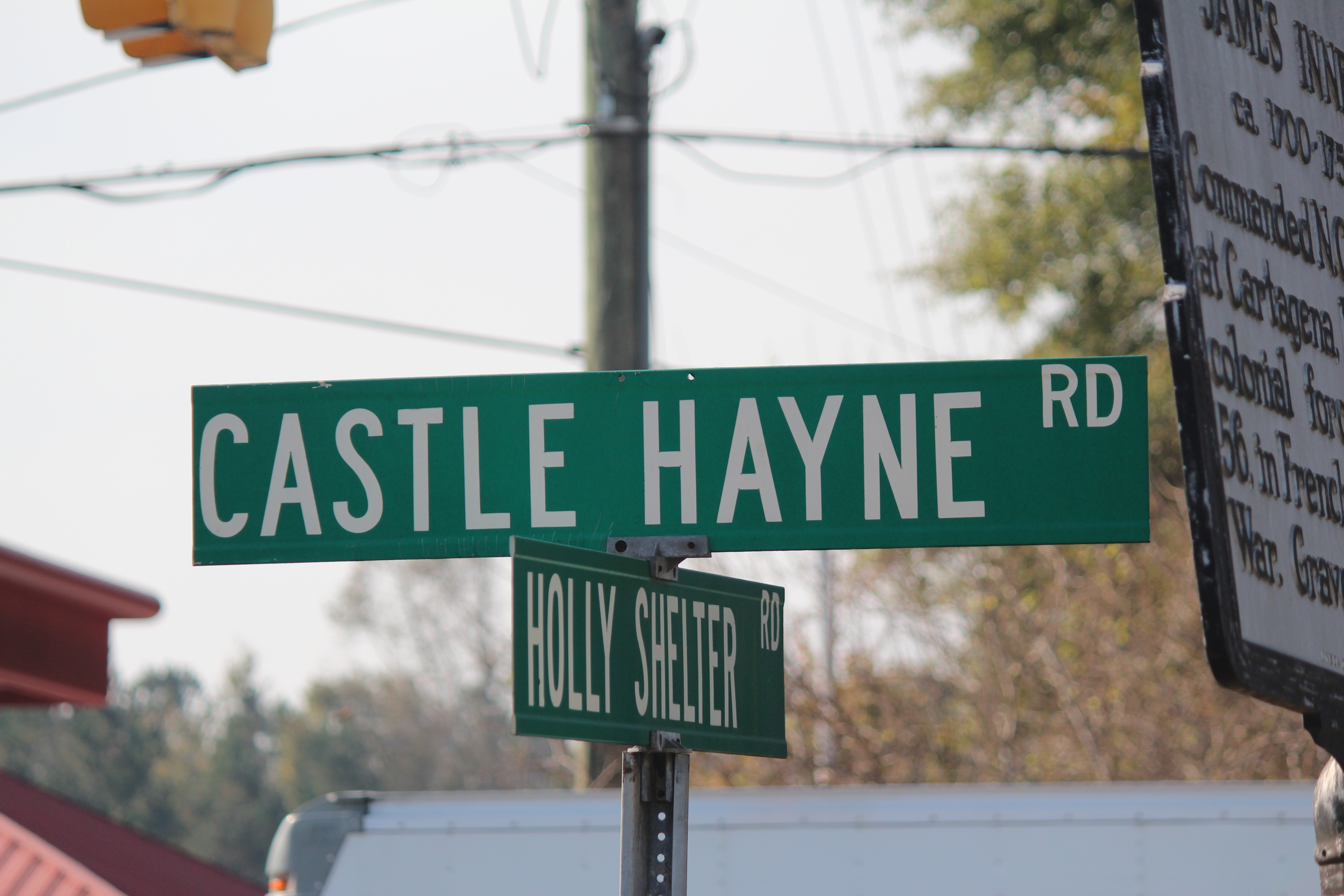
Sign for Castle Hayne Rd (US 117) in the center of Castle Hayne

== Major highways ==
- I-40
- I-140
- US 17
- US 117
- NC 132
- NC 133
