= Masonboro Township, North Carolina =

Township in New Hanover County, North Carolina

Coordinates: 34.148°N 77.871°W

Masonboro Township, North Carolina, is a statistical township consisting of part of Wilmington City, the former Masonboro CDP, the Silver Lake CDP, and the Myrtle Grove CDP which is located in New Hanover County, North, Carolina.

== Demographics ==
Historical population
Census	Pop.	Note	%±
1970	7,553		—
1980	13,777		82.4%
1990	12,797		−7.1%
2000	20,871		63.1%
2010	14,773		−29.2%
2020	16,001		8.3%
