= Federal Point Township, North Carolina =

Coordinates: 33.992°N 77.914°W

Federal Point Township, North Carolina, is a statistical township consisting all of Carolina Beach, Kure Beach, and Sea Breeze. Federal Point Township also includes part of Silver Lake and Myrtle Grove. Federal Point Township is located in New Hanover County, North, Carolina.

== Demographics ==
Historical population
Census	Pop.	Note	%±
1970	5,113		—
1980	8,524		66.7%
1990	10,413		22.2%
2000	17,313		66.3%
2010	25,469		47.1%
2020	31,187		22.5%
