= Jose V. Sartarelli =

Author and former academic administrator

Jose "Zito" Sartarelli is a published author and was the sixth chancellor of the University of North Carolina Wilmington. He is a graduate of the São Paulo School of Business Administration and Michigan State University.

== Career ==
Sartarelli graduated from the São Paulo School of Business Administration (Fundação Getulio Vargas) (1973) with a Bachelor of business administration in marketing, and from Michigan State University as a Fulbright Scholar with an MBA in marketing (1975) and a Ph.D. in business administration (1979). Prior to his positions in academic administration, Sartarelli worked in positions at Eli Lilly and Company, Bristol Myers Squibb, and Johnson & Johnson. Sartarelli served as the Milan Puskar Dean of the College of Business and Economics at West Virginia University since 2010 and was named the university’s first chief global officer in 2013. He then became Chancellor of the University of North Carolina Wilmington in 2015 and retired from the position in 2022.

After retirement, Sartarelli published Giving Flight to Imagination: Imagination, Leadership, and Excellence and was featured author at the 30th Anniversary of the Los Angeles Times Festival of Books.
