= University of North Carolina Wilmington =

Public university in Wilmington, North Carolina, US

- Former names: Wilmington College (1947–1969)
- Motto: Discere Aude (Latin)
- Motto in English: "Dare to Learn"
- Type: Public research university
- Established: September 4, 1947; 79 years ago
- Parent institution: University of North Carolina
- Accreditation: SACS
- Academic affiliations: CUMU
- Endowment: $178.4 million (2025)
- Chancellor: Aswani K. Volety
- Provost: Robert T. Burrus Jr.
- Faculty: 1,012
- Administrative staff: 1,397
- Students: 19,895 (fall 2025)
- Undergraduates: 16,131 (fall 2025)
- Postgraduates: 3,764 (fall 2024)
- Location: Wilmington, North Carolina, United States; 34°13′33″N 77°52′24″W
- Campus: 661 acres (2.67 km^{2}); Midsize city
- Newspaper: The Seahawk
- Colors: Teal, navy, and gold
- Nickname: Seahawks
- Sporting affiliations: NCAA Division I – CAA; Sun Belt
- Mascot: Sammy C. Hawk
- Website: uncw.edu

The University of North Carolina Wilmington, or University of North Carolina at Wilmington, (UNC Wilmington or UNCW) is a public research university in Wilmington, North Carolina. It is part of the University of North Carolina system and enrolled 18,848 undergraduate and graduate students in 2024. It is classified among "R2: Doctoral Universities – High research activity".

Founded on September 4, 1947, Wilmington College opened as a junior college, primarily providing education to World War II veterans. The school became a four-year liberal arts college in 1963, following legislation from the North Carolina General Assembly. In 1969, the college became a university and was renamed as the University of North Carolina Wilmington. Today, it has three campuses with the main campus in Wilmington, an extension campus in Jacksonville, North Carolina, and the Center for Marine Science near Myrtle Grove, North Carolina.

== History ==
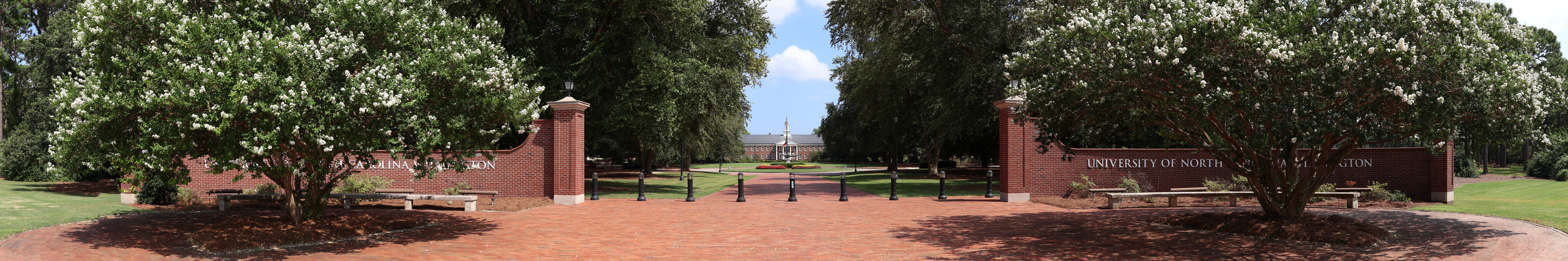
Main entrance on South College Road

UNCW opened its doors on September 4, 1947, as Wilmington College. At the time, it operated as a junior college offering freshman-level courses to 238 students during the first school year, 77% of whom were veterans returning from military service following World War II. Under the control of the New Hanover County Board of Education, Wilmington College earned accreditation from the North Carolina College Conference in 1948 and became a member of the American Association of Junior Colleges. Further accreditation came in 1952 from the Southern Association of Colleges and Schools.

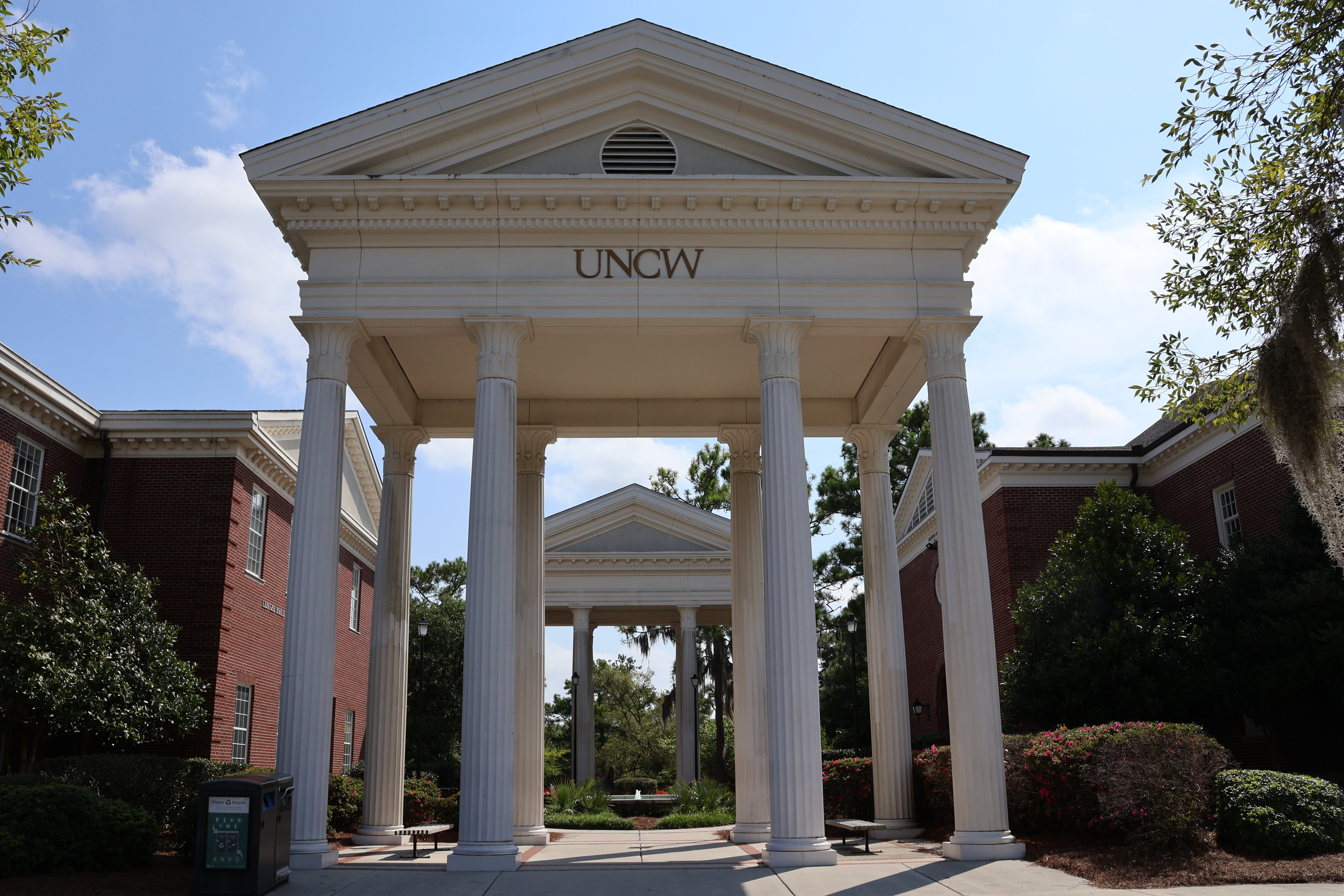
Arches next to Morton and Leutze halls

In 1958, Wilmington College was placed under the Community College Act of North Carolina, passing control from the New Hanover County Board of Education to a board of trustees as a state-supported college under the supervision of the North Carolina Board of Higher Education.

Wilmington College became a four-year liberal arts college on July 1, 1963, when the North Carolina General Assembly passed legislation allowing it to award bachelor's degrees. Six years later, July 1, 1969, the college was elevated to university status under its present name, becoming the fifth campus of the University of North Carolina system. On August 22, 1977, UNCW was authorized to offer its first graduate programs at the master's level.

== Academics ==
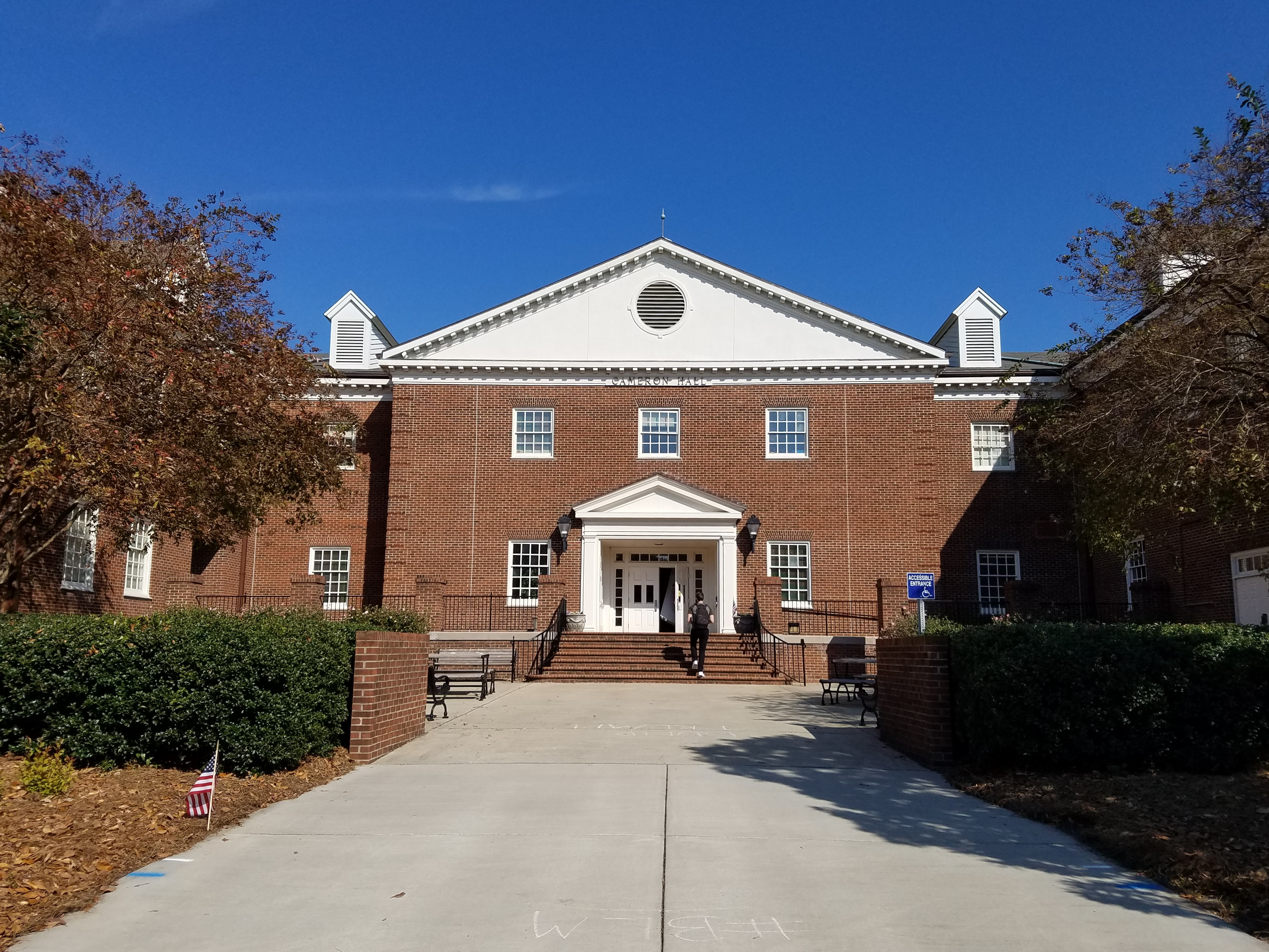
Cameron Hall, the main building of the Cameron School of Business

The university is organized into seven colleges:

- Cameron School of Business
- College of Health and Human Services
- College of Humanities, Social Sciences, and the Arts
- College of Science and Engineering
- Watson College of Education
- Graduate School
- Honors College

The university has 55 undergraduate degree programs, 35 master's degree programs, and 6 doctoral programs.

=== Rankings ===
The Fiske Guide to Colleges, U.S. News & World Report and The Princeton Review are among the publications that have included UNCW in their rankings of universities.

Academic rankings

National
- Forbes: 336
- U.S. News & World Report: 185
- Washington Monthly: 244
- WSJ/College Pulse: > 600

=== UNCW Library ===
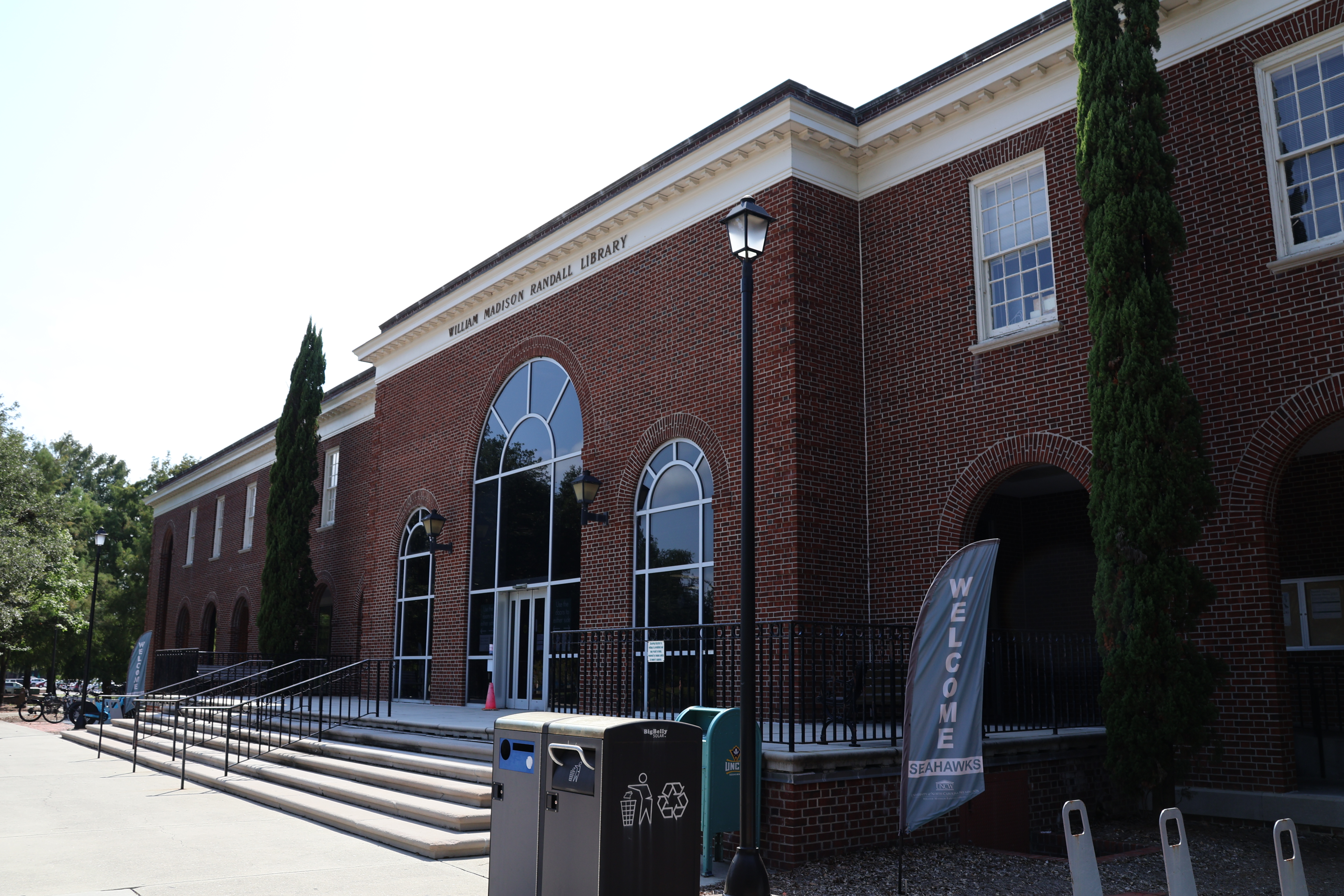
Main entrance of Randall Library

UNCW Library consists of two buildings. Discovery Hall was the result of an expansion project that opened in 2024. Randall Hall retains the library's original namesake, William Madison Randall. The expansion added study spaces, computing stations, the data Visualization and Analysis Lab, an expanded MakerStudio, an exhibit gallery and other resources.

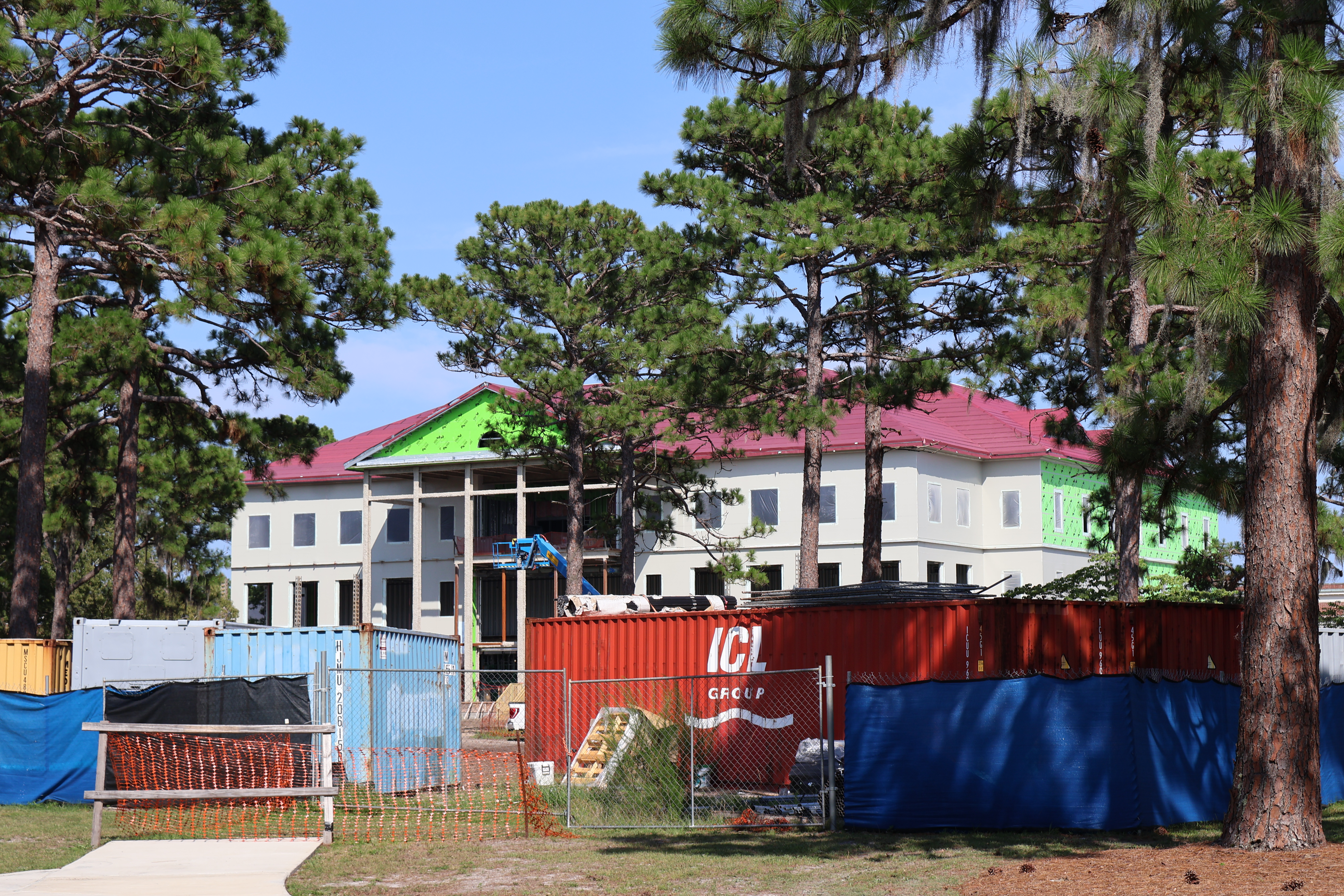
Construction of the Randall Library annex in July 2023

The expansion project started construction in May 2022 and resulted in a three-story addition of roughly 80,000 square feet. The library reopened in August 2024. In the meantime, the library staff successfully utilized their existing space by offering clubs, programs and recreational areas for staff and students.

=== Centers, institutes, and extensions ===
- Center for Support of Undergraduate Research and Fellowships
- Center for Teaching Excellence
- Center for Marine Science
- Center for Innovation and Entrepreneurship
- ETEAL
- Osher Lifelong Learning Institute
- Swain Center for Professional and Continuing Education

== Student life ==
Undergraduate demographics as of Fall 2023
Race and ethnicity	Total
White	79%
Hispanic	9%
Black	4%
Two or more races	3%
Asian	2%
International student	1%
Unknown	1%
Economic diversity
Low-income (Note: The percentage of students who received an income-based federal Pell grant intended for low-income students.)	25%
Affluent (Note: The percentage of students who are a part of the American middle class at the bare minimum.)	75%

=== Campus life ===
Teal is the official school color of UNCW, with navy and gold as alternate colors.

The average high school GPA was 4.13 for incoming freshmen in 2018 and the SAT average score was 1251.

=== Student facilities ===
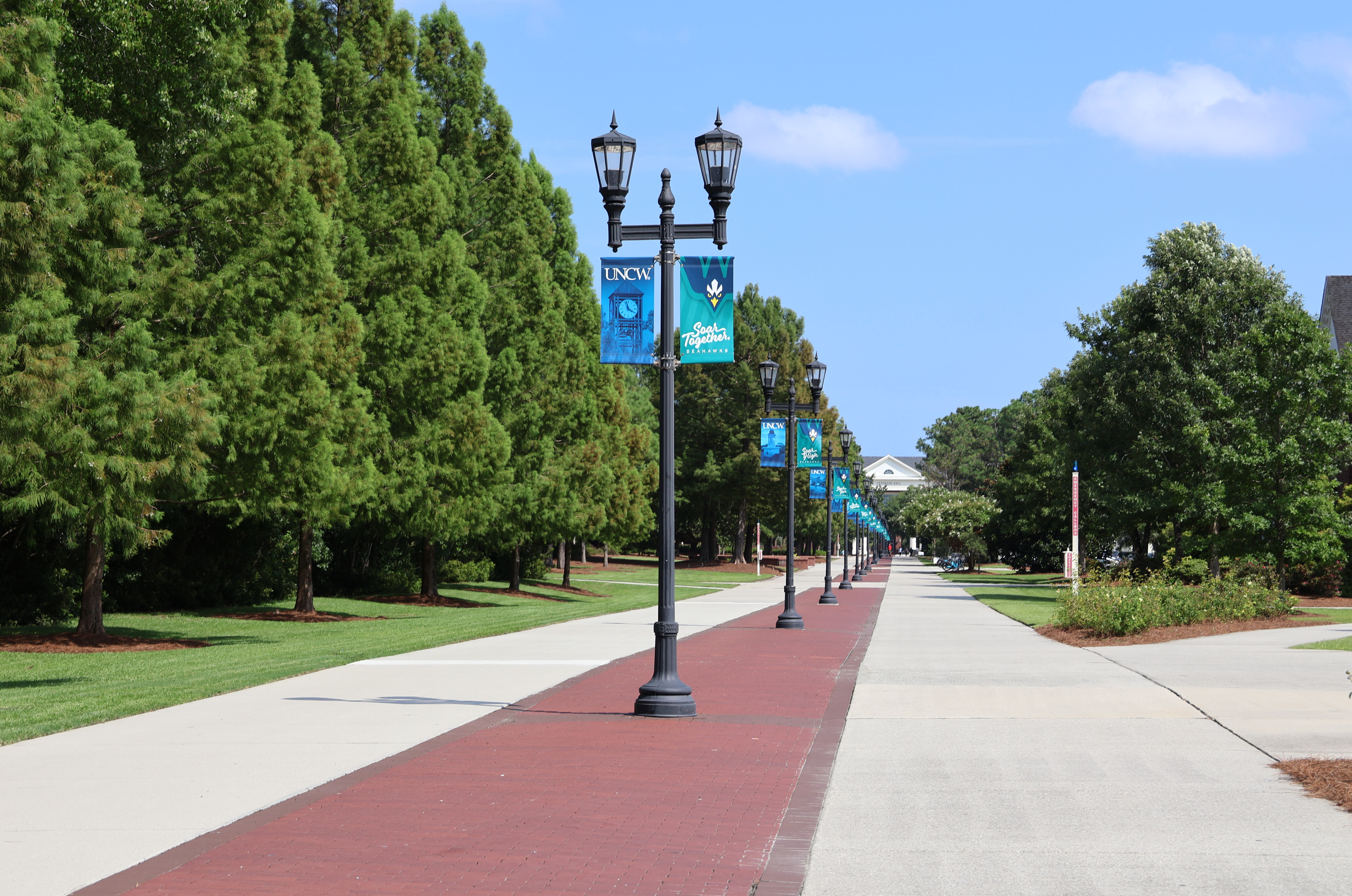
Chancellor's Walk, the center of campus, around midafternoon

In 2000, the Student Recreation Center was opened to students, staff, and faculty members. It houses three basketball courts, exercise machines, a weight training area, an indoor running track, and an indoor climbing wall. It also includes a group exercise room which supports multiple clubs and activities, including Yoga, Pilates, and an Aikido club. In 2012, the Student Recreation Center completed an expansion of facilities, as well as construction on a new natatorium. This construction doubled the size of the existing Recreation Center.

Lumina Theater, named after the boardwalk theater that was once found on Wrightsville Beach, features 333 stadium seats, a 15.5' x 30' screen, Dolby Digital surround sound, and a digital projection system. Lumina screens blockbusters, independents, cult classics, art films, international films and student films throughout the academic year, several days a week, except during University holidays and breaks. Some notable Lumina events included a multi-part, high-definition screening of BBC's Planet Earth series over the span of several weekends, and a yearly 24-hour movie marathon called Hawk-In.

=== Housing ===
On campus, the Department of Housing and Residence Life manages thirty-five residence halls and on-campus apartment/suite buildings. The buildings are managed within geographically similar "areas," which are led by a Residence Coordinator (RC) and Assistance Residence Coordinator (ARC). The UNCW Residence Hall Association (RHA) is the overall governing body for the residence halls and is composed of councils from each of the residential areas.

A residential quad on the south-central side of campus, comprising Belk Hall, Graham Hall, Hewlett Hall, Loggerhead Hall, Pelican Hall, Sandpiper Hall and Terrapin Hall, houses almost 2,400 students. Galloway Hall was UNCW's first residence facility on campus. It was the first dorm in the UNC system to be built with air conditioning and was originally called "Dorm '71." Belk, Graham and Hewlett residence halls are configured in suite-style hall arrangements with up to eight individuals sharing a bathroom. Combined they house 570 first-year students. Originally a co-ed facility, Belk Hall was all female for quite some years before returning co-ed beginning in the 2016–2017 academic year. Pelican Hall and Sandpiper Hall were completed in 2020 as a part of the larger housing quad project. The buildings are built to mirror each other, each containing a pod-style layout and 518 first-year bed spaces. Loggerhead and Terrapin Halls were completed in 2021 and consist of 775 bed spaces, mainly for first- and second-year students in semi-suite style.

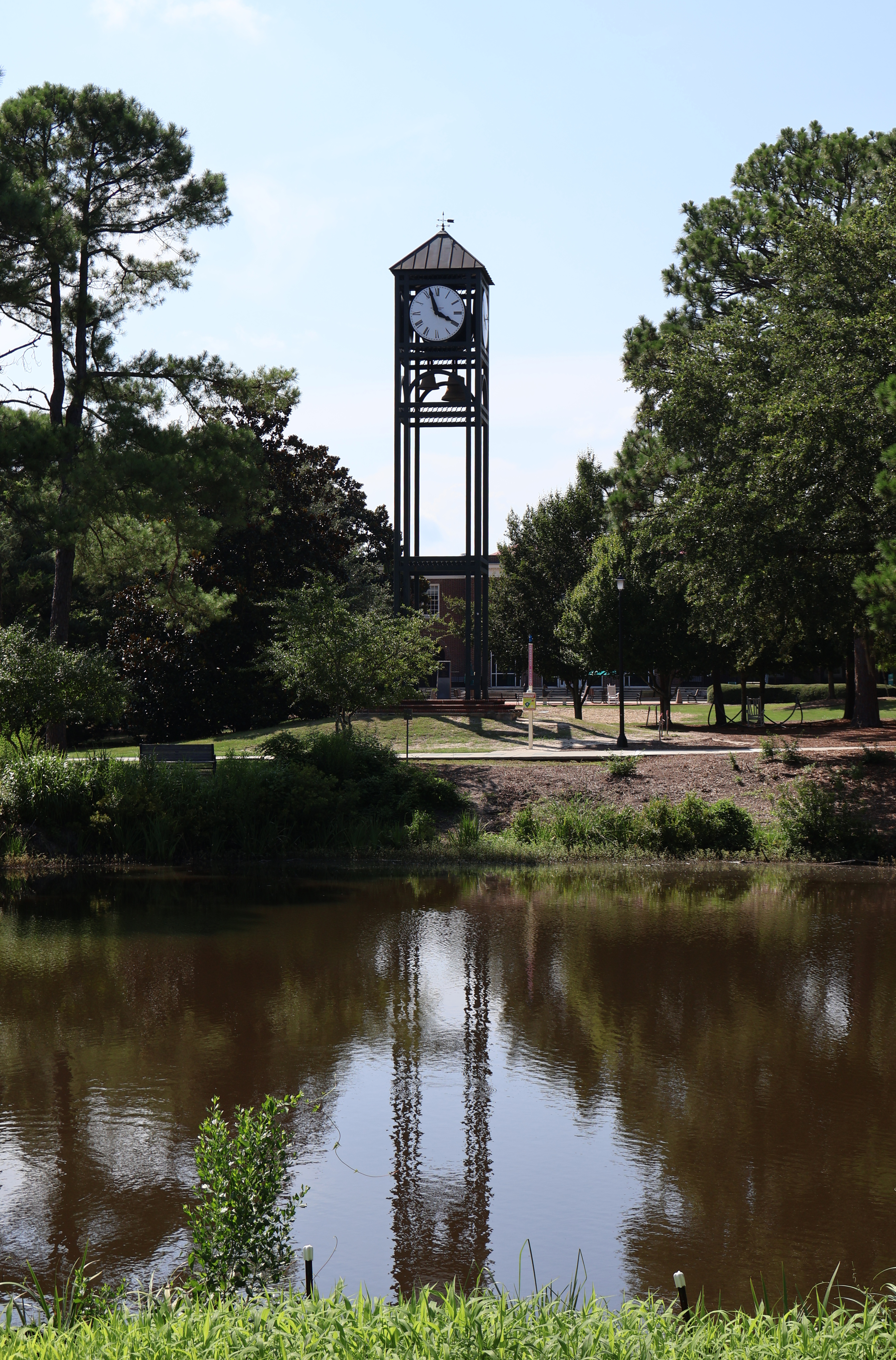
Leutze Lake and the campus clock tower at the end of Chancellor's Walk

Schwartz Hall houses 160 residents and is home to mostly first-year students. Adjacent to Schwartz Hall are the University Suites, and the Fraternity and Sorority Village, which consist of seven pod-style buildings housing 400 students. Various fraternities and sororities have personalized suites within this area.

Keystone Hall, Cornerstone Hall, and Innovation House form a residential area known as "Tri-House." All three residence halls were constructed in the late 1990s and early 2000s. Combined the area can house 465 students, with 265 students in Cornerstone Hall, and 100 in Keystone and Innovation House respectively. All three buildings are in a traditional format.

Three on-campus apartment complexes are located at UNCW, Seahawk Village, Seahawk Crossing, and Seahawk Landing. The Seahawks are reserved for graduate students and upperclass students (including sophomores). Seahawk Village contains two, three, and four bedroom apartments, which house 524 students within six apartment buildings. Additionally, Seahawk Village contains a pool and clubhouse, accessible only to residents. Seahawk Landing contains similar two, three, and four bedroom apartments, with a combined 662 students living in seven buildings. Seahawk Landing contains a pool, accessible only to residents, with a convenience market open to the public. Seahawk Crossing contains a slightly different layout, containing four, six, and eight person apartments with a combined 662 students within four apartment buildings.

=== Greek life ===
Fraternities and sororities have continued to grow at UNCW with membership now around 9.8% percent of the overall student population, falling slightly below the national average. There are 11 Panhellenic Council (PHC) sororities on campus. The National Pan-Hellenic Council at the university has six historically black organizations, three fraternities and three sororities. UNCW also has one Christian sorority.

== Athletics ==
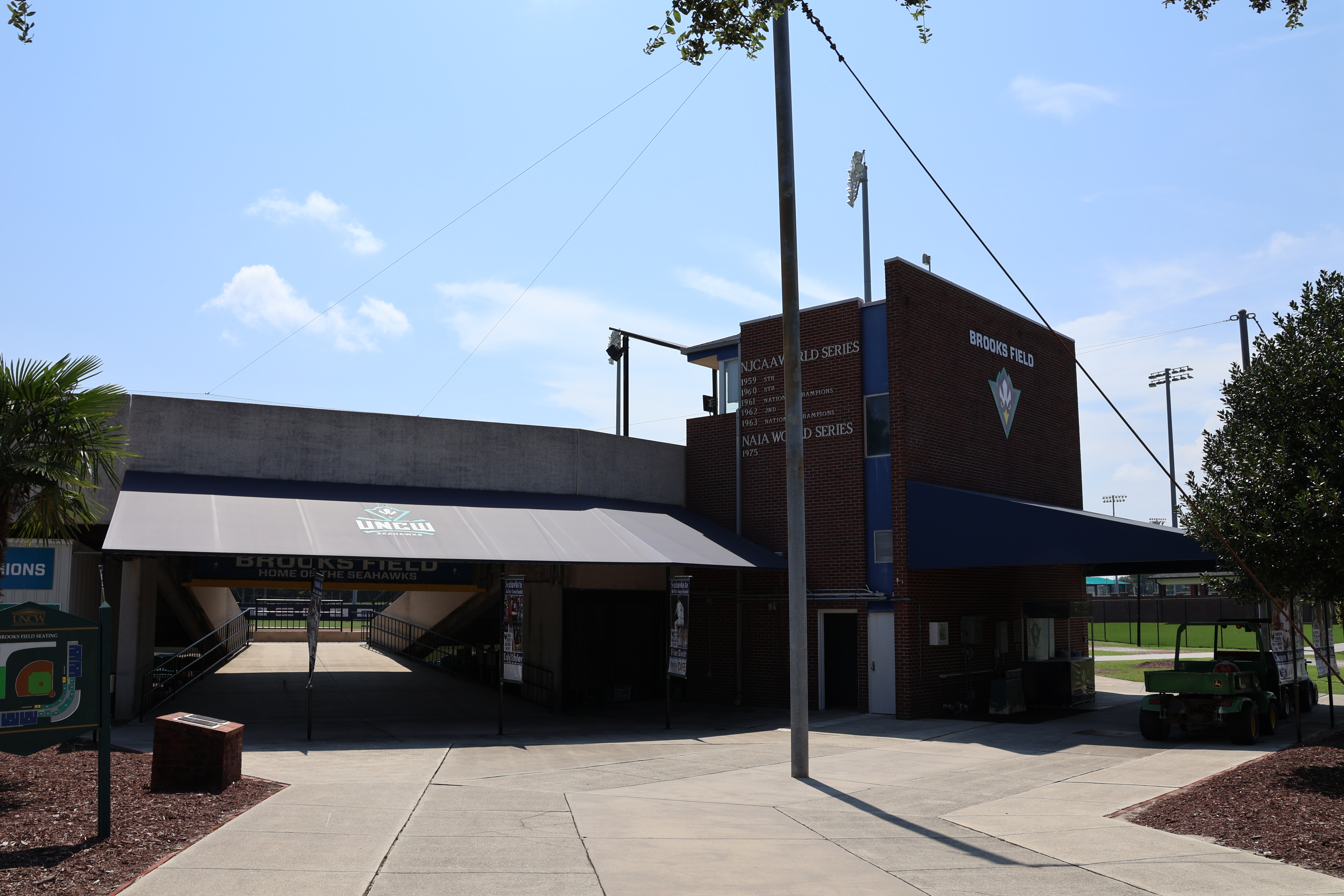
Entrance of Brooks Field

The university is informally known as "UNC by the Sea," and UNCW athletic teams are known as the Seahawks. They are NCAA Division I members fielding 8 varsity athletic teams for men (baseball, basketball, cross country, golf, soccer, swimming & diving, tennis, track & field) and 10 for women (basketball, beach volleyball, cross country, golf, soccer, softball, swimming & diving, tennis, track & field, volleyball). UNCW is a member of the Coastal Athletic Association. The men's and women's basketball teams play at Trask Coliseum and the baseball team plays at Brooks Field. The teams' colors include navy blue, teal, and gold.

== Notable people ==
=== Faculty ===
- Herbert Berg, Philosophy and Religion (former faculty member)
- Clyde Edgerton, Creative Writing
- Philip Furia, Creative Writing (deceased)
- David Gessner, Creative Writing
- Peter Jurasik, Acting for the Camera
- Jason Mott, Creative Writing
- Tim Palmer, French and Japanese film studies (former faculty member)
- Joseph R. Pawlik, Frank Hawkins Kenan Distinguished Professor of Marine Biology
- Jose V. Sartarelli, ex-Chancellor
- Jarrod Tanny, Charles and Hannah Block Distinguished Scholar in Jewish History
