= Monkey Junction, North Carolina =

Coordinates: 34.1400°N 77.8935°W

- Unincorporated community
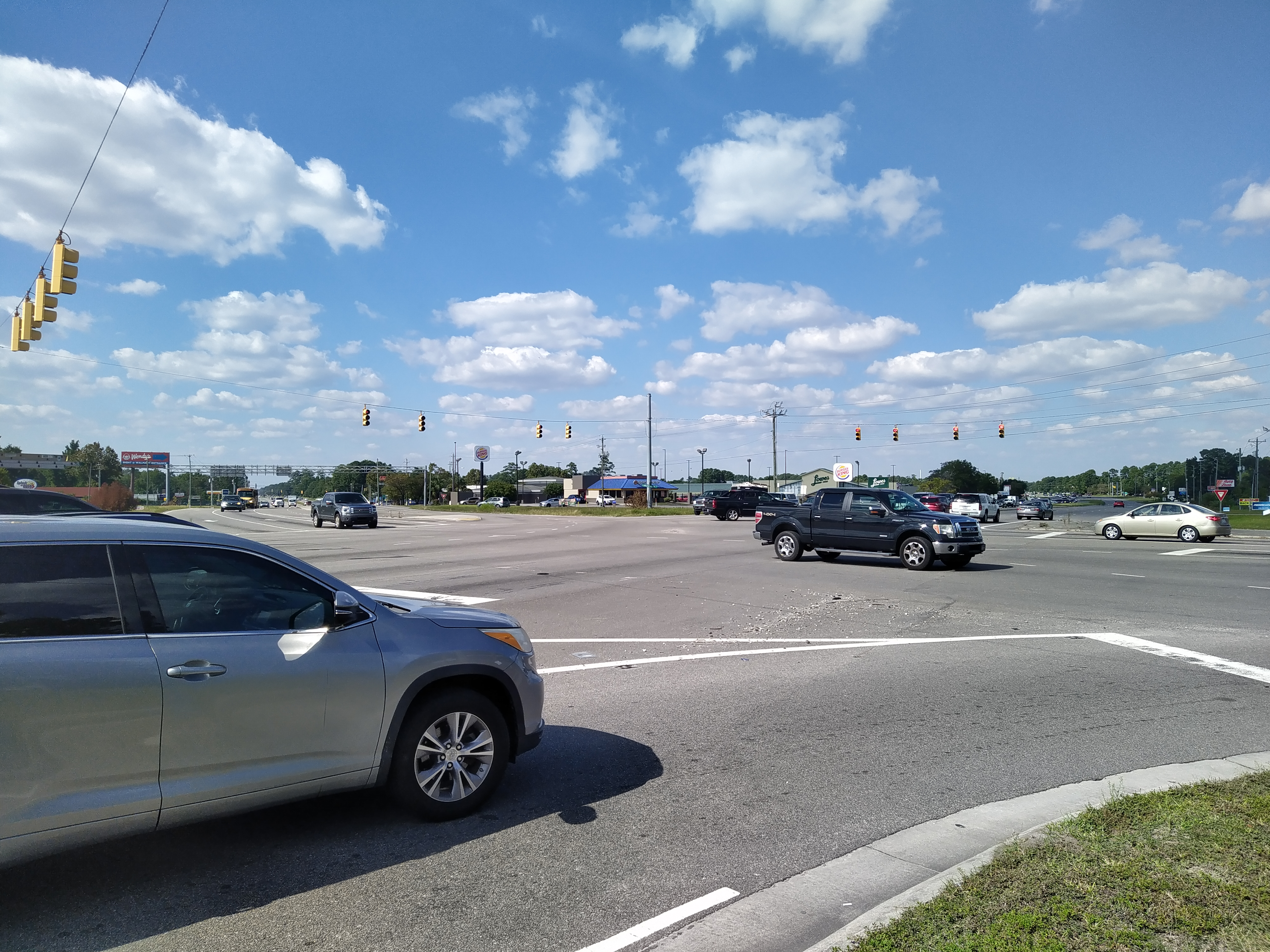
- Northerly view of Monkey Junction in September 2021, taken from the junction's southeast corner
- Interactive map of Monkey Junction, North Carolina
- Country: United States
- State: North Carolina
- County: New Hanover
- Time zone: Eastern

Monkey Junction is an unincorporated area near Wilmington, North Carolina, United States, in New Hanover County at the intersection of College Road (NC 132) and Carolina Beach Road (US 421). It is one of several centers of recent commercial and residential growth near Wilmington. In 2008, Wilmington began controversial efforts to annex the community, but in 2012, the annexation requests were overturned by the North Carolina General Assembly.

== History ==
The intersection has been known as "Monkey Junction" for almost seventy years, due to a gas station that was located there from the late 1930s through the mid-1970s. The station, run by Dina and Jack Spindle, kept live monkeys in order to attract customers from a bus that passed by on the way to and from Carolina Beach, which lies several miles south of the junction. The bus driver would stop near the station and announce "Monkey Junction".

Non-natives can be readily identified as they refer to the locale as it appears on maps "Myrtle Grove Junction", a reference to the local residential neighborhood nearby.
