= Myrtle Grove, North Carolina =

- CDP
- Location in New Hanover County and the state of North Carolina.
- Coordinates: 34°07′23″N 77°53′00″W
- Country: United States
- State: North Carolina
- County: New Hanover

Area
  - Total: 7.22 sq mi (18.69 km^{2})
  - Land: 6.71 sq mi (17.37 km^{2})
  - Water: 0.51 sq mi (1.32 km^{2})
- Elevation: 26 ft (7.9 m)

Population (2020)
  - Total: 11,476
  - Density: 1,711/sq mi (660.7/km^{2})
- Time zone: UTC-5 (Eastern (EST))
  - Summer (DST): UTC-4 (EDT)
- FIPS code: 37-45840
- GNIS feature ID: 2403323

Myrtle Grove is a census-designated place (CDP) in New Hanover County, North Carolina, United States. The population was 11,476 at the 2020 census which is up from 8,875 in 2010. Myrtle Grove is located in the statistical townships of Federal Point and Masonboro. The CDP is part of the Wilmington, NC Metropolitan Statistical Area. Myrtle Grove was first listed as a CDP at the 1980 United States census.

== Geography ==
According to the United States Census Bureau, the CDP has a total area of 7.3 square miles (19 km^{2}), of which 6.9 square miles (17.8 km^{2}) is land and 0.4 square miles (1.0 km^{2}) (5.37%) is water.

== Demographics ==
Historical population
Census	Pop.	Note	%±
1980	2,552		—
1990	4,275		67.5%
2000	7,125		66.7%
2010	8,875		24.6%
2020	11,476		29.3%
U.S. Decennial Census

=== 2020 census ===
As of the 2020 census, Myrtle Grove had a population of 11,476. The median age was 45.4 years. 21.3% of residents were under the age of 18 and 21.2% of residents were 65 years of age or older. For every 100 females there were 93.8 males, and for every 100 females age 18 and over there were 90.8 males age 18 and over.

100.0% of residents lived in urban areas, while 0.0% lived in rural areas.

There were 4,449 households in Myrtle Grove, of which 32.0% had children under the age of 18 living in them. Of all households, 60.6% were married-couple households, 12.9% were households with a male householder and no spouse or partner present, and 19.8% were households with a female householder and no spouse or partner present. About 18.7% of all households were made up of individuals and 9.2% had someone living alone who was 65 years of age or older. As of the 2020 census, there were 3,222 families residing in the CDP.

There were 4,743 housing units, of which 6.2% were vacant. The homeowner vacancy rate was 1.4% and the rental vacancy rate was 5.8%.

Myrtle Grove racial composition
Race	Number	Percentage
White (non-Hispanic)	10,038	87.47%
Black or African American (non-Hispanic)	332	2.89%
Native American	37	0.32%
Asian	176	1.53%
Pacific Islander	7	0.06%
Other/Mixed	459	4.0%
Hispanic or Latino	427	3.72%

=== 2000 census ===
As of the census of 2000, there were 7,125 people, 2,839 households, and 2,222 families residing in the CDP. The population density was 1,037.4 inhabitants per square mile (400.5/km^{2}). There were 3,021 housing units at an average density of 439.9 per square mile (169.8/km^{2}). The racial makeup of the CDP was 94.54% White, 3.55% African American, 0.17% Native American, 0.86% Asian, 0.11% Pacific Islander, 0.14% from other races, and 0.63% from two or more races. Hispanic or Latino of any race were 0.93% of the population.

There were 2,839 households, out of which 32.2% had children under the age of 18 living with them, 67.2% were married couples living together, 7.9% had a female householder with no husband present, and 21.7% were non-families. 16.3% of all households were made up of individuals, and 4.9% had someone living alone who was 65 years of age or older. The average household size was 2.51 and the average family size was 2.80.

In the CDP, the population was spread out, with 22.5% under the age of 18, 6.0% from 18 to 24, 29.4% from 25 to 44, 30.8% from 45 to 64, and 11.3% who were 65 years of age or older. The median age was 40 years. For every 100 females, there were 98.1 males. For every 100 females age 18 and over, there were 96.5 males.

The median income for a household in the CDP was $55,242, and the median income for a family was $60,850. Males had a median income of $40,638 versus $25,597 for females. The per capita income for the CDP was $28,775. About 4.4% of families and 5.8% of the population were below the poverty line, including 8.0% of those under age 18 and 2.3% of those age 65 or over.
