= Silver Lake, North Carolina =

- CDP
- Location in New Hanover County and the state of North Carolina.
- Coordinates: 34°08′27″N 77°54′32″W
- Country: United States
- State: North Carolina
- County: New Hanover

Area
  - Total: 2.50 sq mi (6.48 km^{2})
  - Land: 2.47 sq mi (6.39 km^{2})
  - Water: 0.035 sq mi (0.09 km^{2})
- Elevation: 13 ft (4.0 m)

Population (2020)
  - Total: 6,500
  - Density: 2,635.9/sq mi (1,017.72/km^{2})
- Time zone: UTC-5 (Eastern (EST))
  - Summer (DST): UTC-4 (EDT)
- ZIP code: 28412
- Area codes: 910, 472
- FIPS code: 37-61950
- GNIS feature ID: 2402855

Silver Lake is a census-designated place in New Hanover County, North Carolina, United States. As of the 2020 census, Silver Lake had a population of 6,500. It is part of the Wilmington Metropolitan Statistical Area.

== Geography ==
According to the United States Census Bureau, the CDP has a total area of 6.6 square miles (17 km^{2}), of which 6.6 square miles (17.0 km^{2}) is land and 0.15% is water.

== Demographics ==
Historical population
Census	Pop.	Note	%±
1990	4,071		—
2000	5,788		42.2%
2010	5,598		−3.3%
2020	6,500		16.1%
U.S. Decennial Census

=== 2020 census ===
As of the 2020 census, Silver Lake had a population of 6,500. The median age was 40.9 years. 21.7% of residents were under the age of 18 and 19.1% of residents were 65 years of age or older. For every 100 females there were 94.7 males, and for every 100 females age 18 and over there were 91.6 males age 18 and over.

100.0% of residents lived in urban areas, while 0.0% lived in rural areas.

There were 2,562 households in Silver Lake, of which 30.2% had children under the age of 18 living in them. Of all households, 49.6% were married-couple households, 15.3% were households with a male householder and no spouse or partner present, and 25.7% were households with a female householder and no spouse or partner present. About 22.9% of all households were made up of individuals and 10.6% had someone living alone who was 65 years of age or older.

There were 2,692 housing units, of which 4.8% were vacant. The homeowner vacancy rate was 1.3% and the rental vacancy rate was 3.7%.

Racial composition as of the 2020 census
Race	Number	Percent
White	4,733	72.8%
Black or African American	392	6.0%
American Indian and Alaska Native	45	0.7%
Asian	85	1.3%
Native Hawaiian and Other Pacific Islander	2	0.0%
Some other race	585	9.0%
Two or more races	658	10.1%
Hispanic or Latino (of any race)	1,095	16.8%

=== 2000 census ===
As of the census of 2000, there were 5,788 people, 2,280 households, and 1,566 families residing in the CDP. The population density was 882.0 inhabitants per square mile (340.5/km^{2}). There were 2,449 housing units at an average density of 373.2 per square mile (144.1/km^{2}). The racial makeup of the CDP was 88.23% White, 8.00% African American, 0.59% Native American, 1.21% Asian, 0.10% Pacific Islander, 0.81% from other races, and 1.05% from two or more races. Hispanic or Latino of any race were 2.16% of the population.

There were 2,280 households, out of which 33.9% had children under the age of 18 living with them, 54.2% were married couples living together, 10.9% had a female householder with no husband present, and 31.3% were non-families. 21.7% of all households were made up of individuals, and 3.6% had someone living alone who was 65 years of age or older. The average household size was 2.51 and the average family size was 2.97.

In the CDP, the population was spread out, with 25.2% under the age of 18, 9.5% from 18 to 24, 35.1% from 25 to 44, 22.5% from 45 to 64, and 7.7% who were 65 years of age or older. The median age was 33 years. For every 100 females, there were 93.1 males. For every 100 females age 18 and over, there were 89.7 males.

The median income for a household in the CDP was $41,732, and the median income for a family was $49,434. Males had a median income of $36,631 versus $22,444 for females. The per capita income for the CDP was $19,609. About 4.5% of families and 9.1% of the population were below the poverty line, including 6.3% of those under age 18 and 7.2% of those age 65 or over.
