= St. Mark Catholic School (Wilmington, North Carolina) =

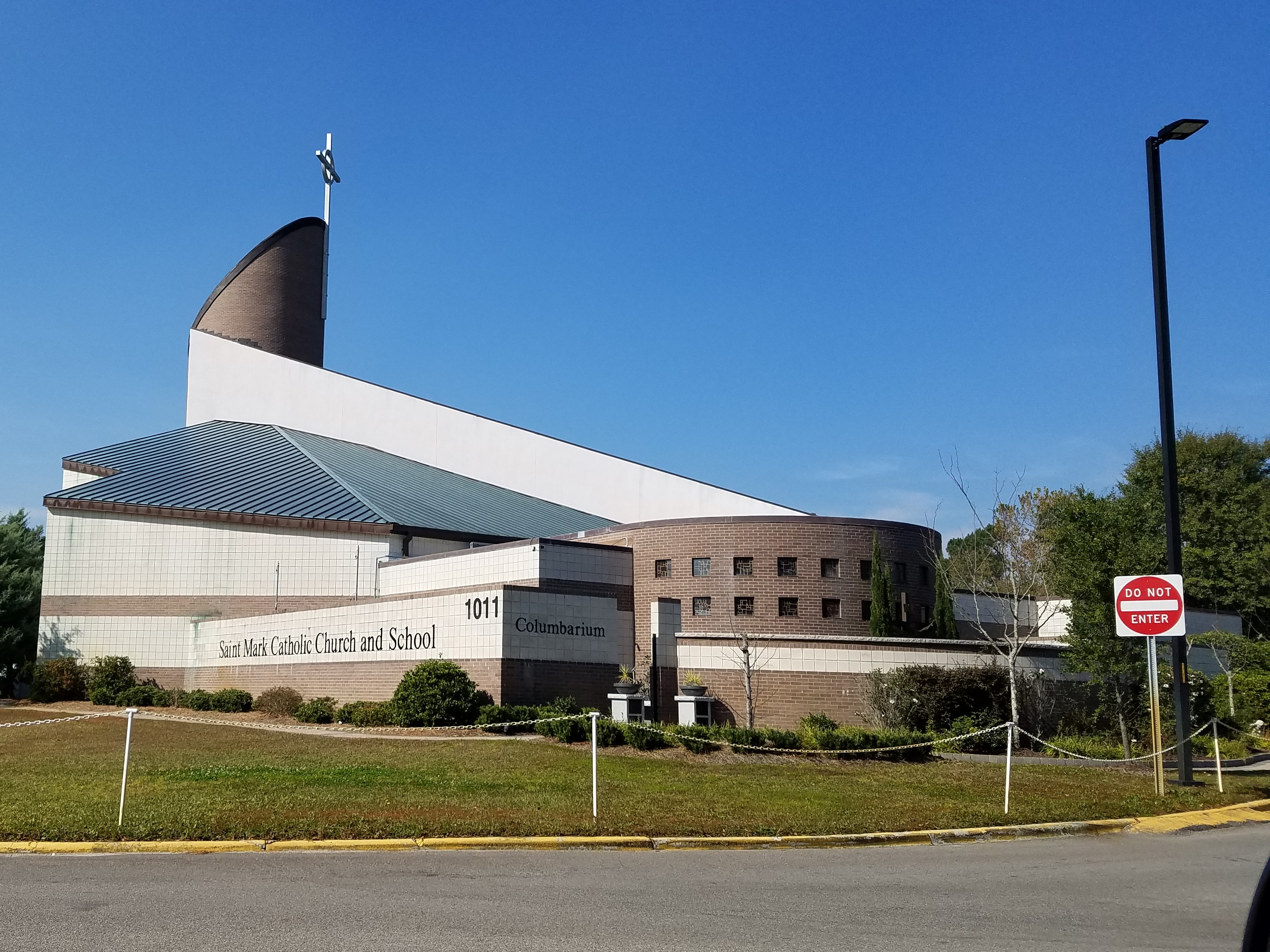

Location
- 1013 Eastwood Road; Wilmington, North Carolina 28403; United States
- 34°14′17″N 77°50′38″W

Information
- Type: Private
- Founded: 2002 (24 years ago)
- Principal: Tripp Burton
- Grades: Pre-K–8
- Enrollment: Over 500 (2015)
- Language: English
- Colors: Green, gold, white
- Mascot: Mighty Lions
- Website: smcsnc.org

St. Mark Catholic School is a Catholic school catering to students from grades Pre-K to 8. It is located in Wilmington, North Carolina. St. Mark Catholic School operates from inside St. Mark Catholic Church. It adjoins St. Mark Catholic Church, where students attend mass every Wednesday.

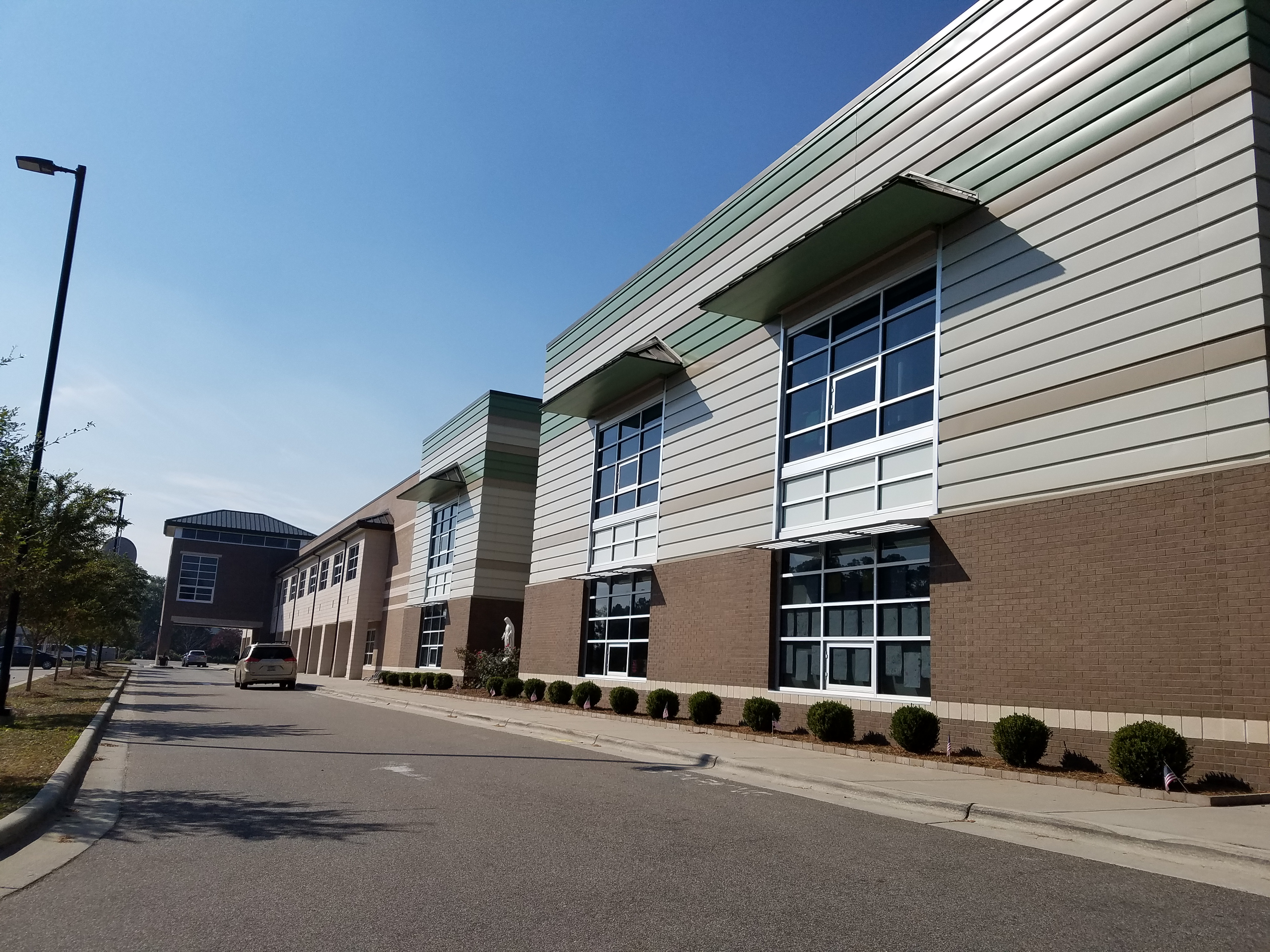
St Mark activity center located behind the main building
